= Long Beach, California =

- City
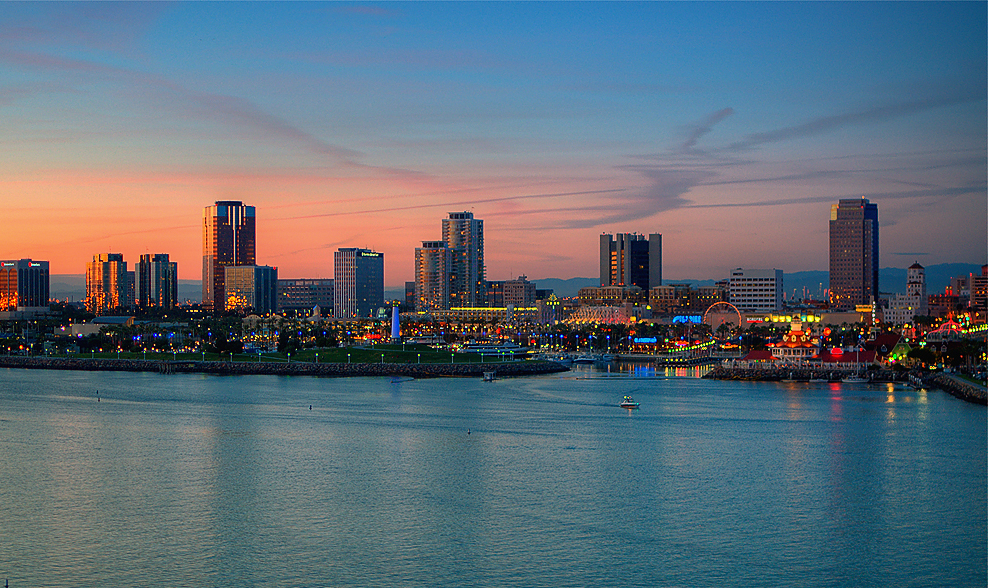
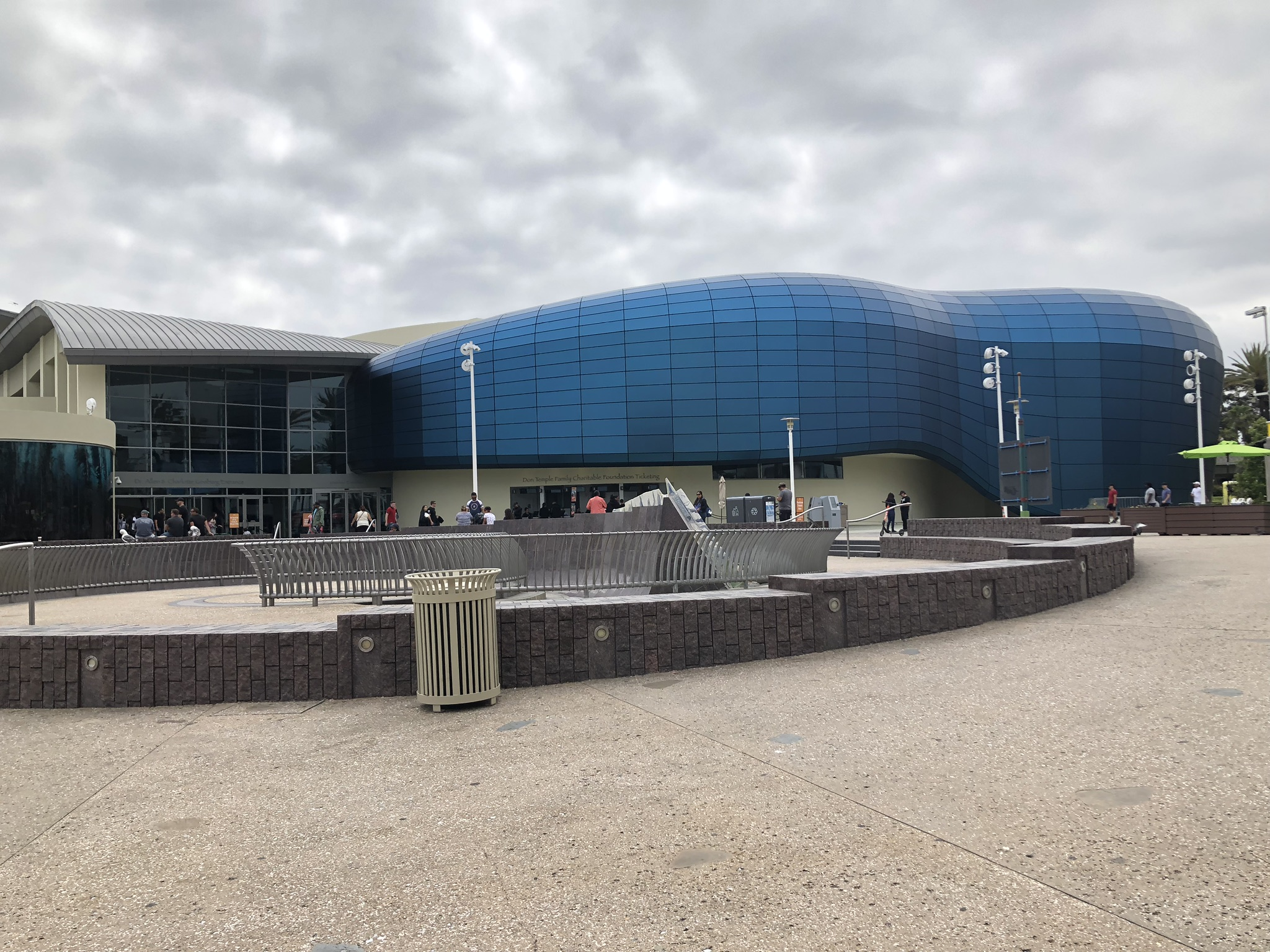
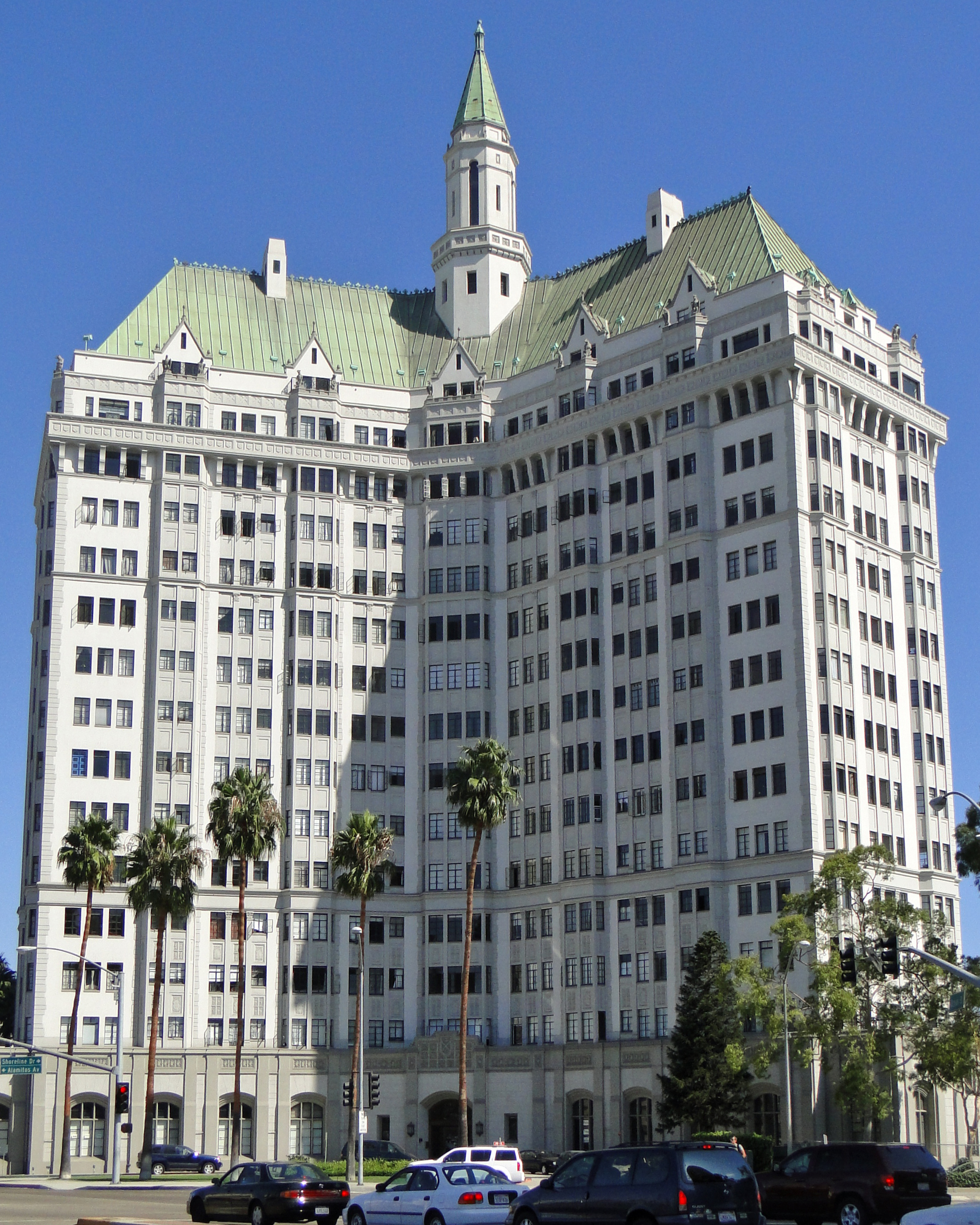
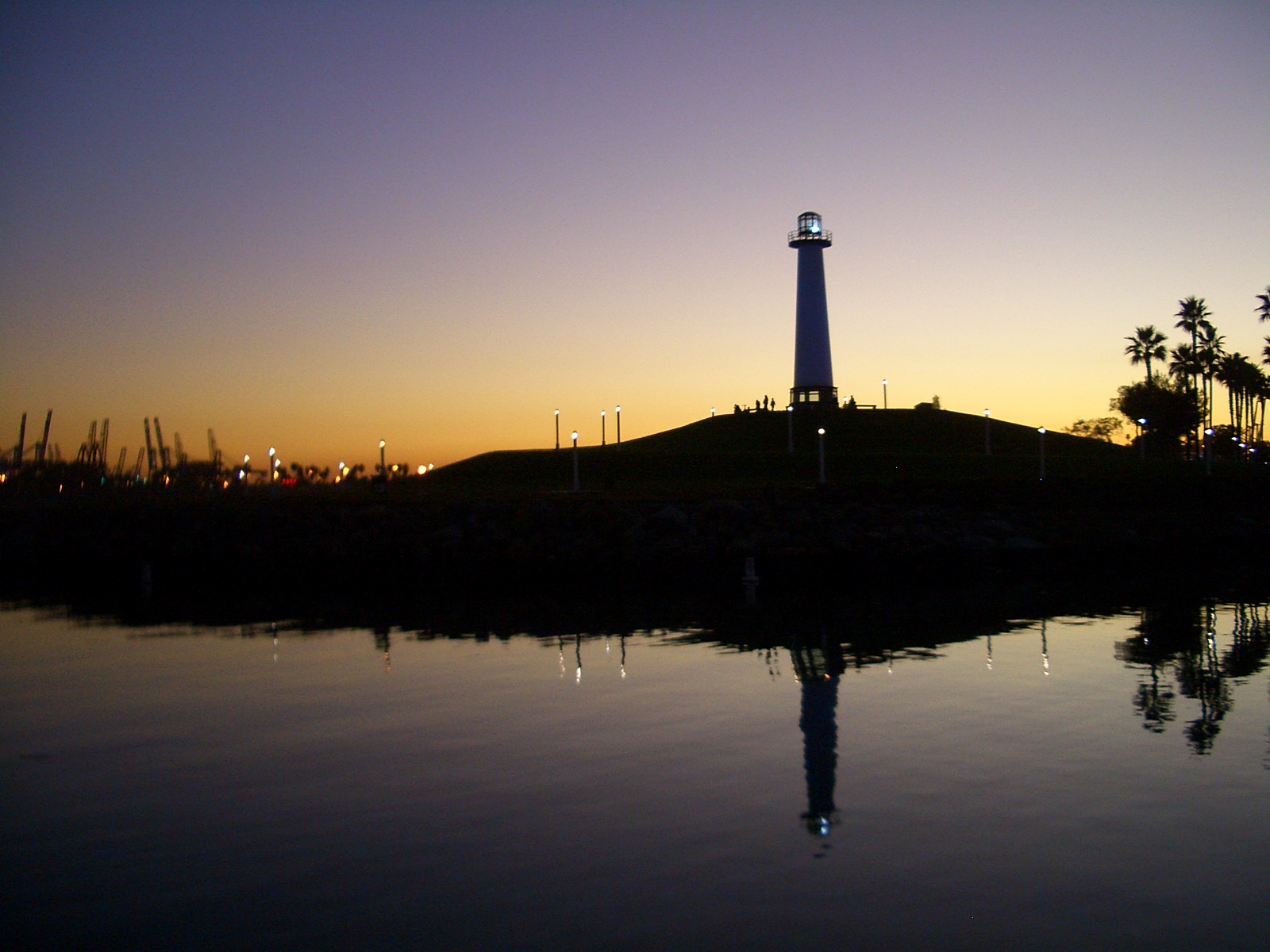
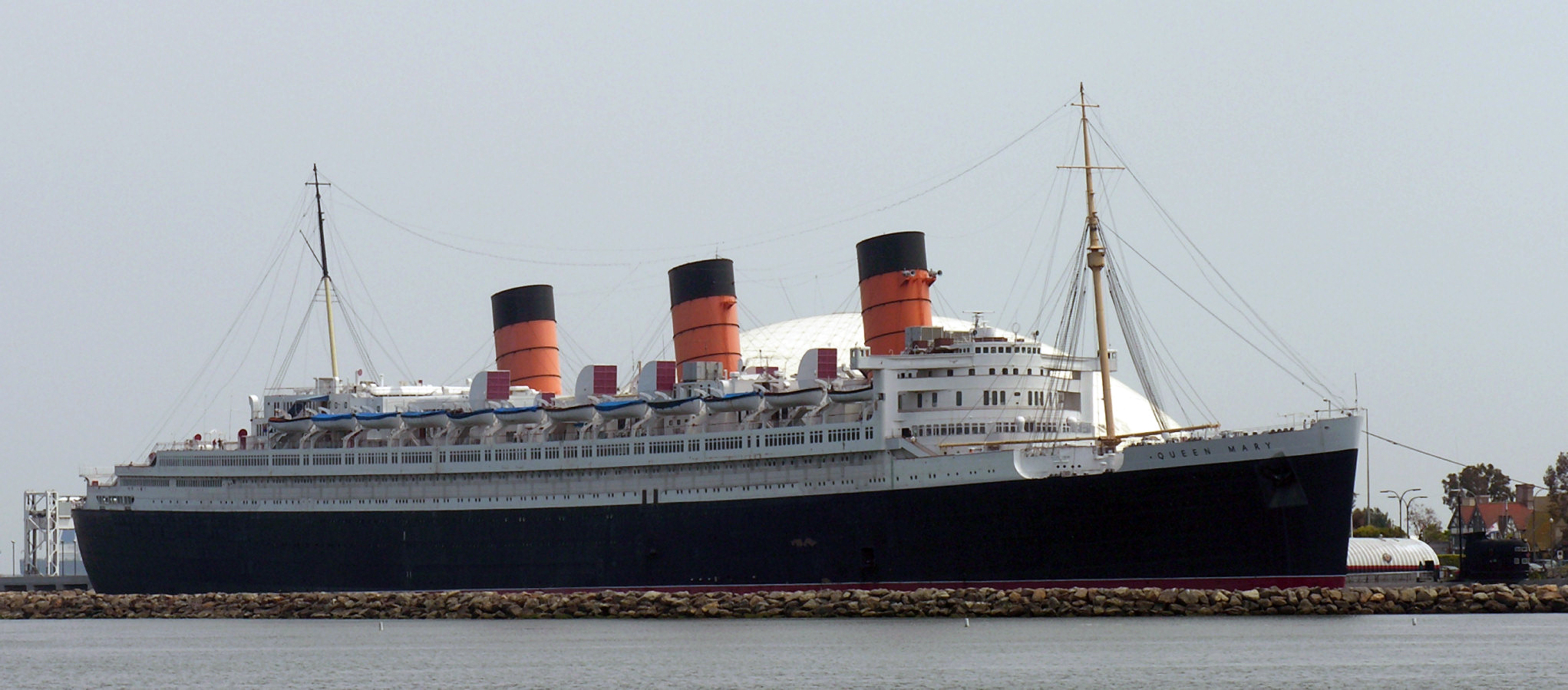
- Downtown Long Beach skyline Aquarium of the Pacific Villa Riviera Lions Lighthouse Retired RMS Queen Mary

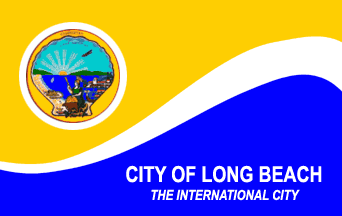
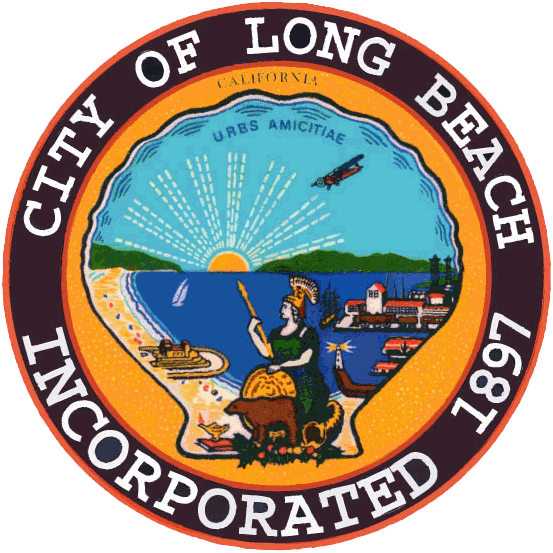
- Flag Seal
- Nicknames: "Aquatic Capital of America", "The LBC"
- Motto: "The International City"
- Interactive map of Long Beach, California
- Location within California Location within the United States
- Coordinates: 33°46′6″N 118°11′44″W
- Country: United States
- State: California
- County: Los Angeles
- CSA: Los Angeles-Long Beach
- MSA: Los Angeles-Long Beach-Anaheim
- Incorporated: December 13, 1897

Government
  - Type: Council-manager
  - Mayor: Rex Richardson (D)
  - Legislative body: City Council
  - City manager: Tom Modica

Area
  - City: 77.84 sq mi (201.61 km^{2})
  - Land: 50.71 sq mi (131.35 km^{2})
  - Water: 27.13 sq mi (70.26 km^{2}) 34.85%
- Elevation: 52 ft (16 m)

Population (2020)
  - City: 466,742
  - Estimate (2025): 450,469 ▼
  - Rank: 44th in the United States; 7th in California
  - Density: 9,205.4/sq mi (3,554.23/km^{2})
- Time zone: UTC-08:00 (PST)
  - Summer (DST): UTC-07:00 (PDT)
- ZIP Codes: 90801–90810, 90813–90815, 90822, 90831–90835, 90840, 90842, 90844, 90846–90848, 90853, 90895, 90899
- Area code: 562
- FIPS code: 06-43000
- GNIS feature IDs: 1652747, 2410866
- Website: longbeach.gov

Long Beach is a coastal city in southeastern Los Angeles County, California, United States. It is the 44th-most populous city in the United States, with a population of 450,469 as of 2025. A charter city, Long Beach is the 7th-most populous city in California, the 2nd-most populous city in Los Angeles County, and the largest city in California that is not a county seat.

Incorporated in 1897, Long Beach is in Southern California, in the southern part of Los Angeles County. Long Beach is approximately 20 miles (32 km) south of downtown Los Angeles, and is part of the Gateway Cities region. The Port of Long Beach is the second busiest container port in the United States and is among the world's largest shipping ports. The city is over an oilfield with minor wells both directly beneath the city as well as offshore.

The city is known for its waterfront attractions, including the permanently docked RMS Queen Mary and the Aquarium of the Pacific. Long Beach also hosts the Grand Prix of Long Beach auto race and the Long Beach Pride Festival and Parade. California State University, Long Beach is one of the largest universities in California.

== History ==
=== Tongva period ===
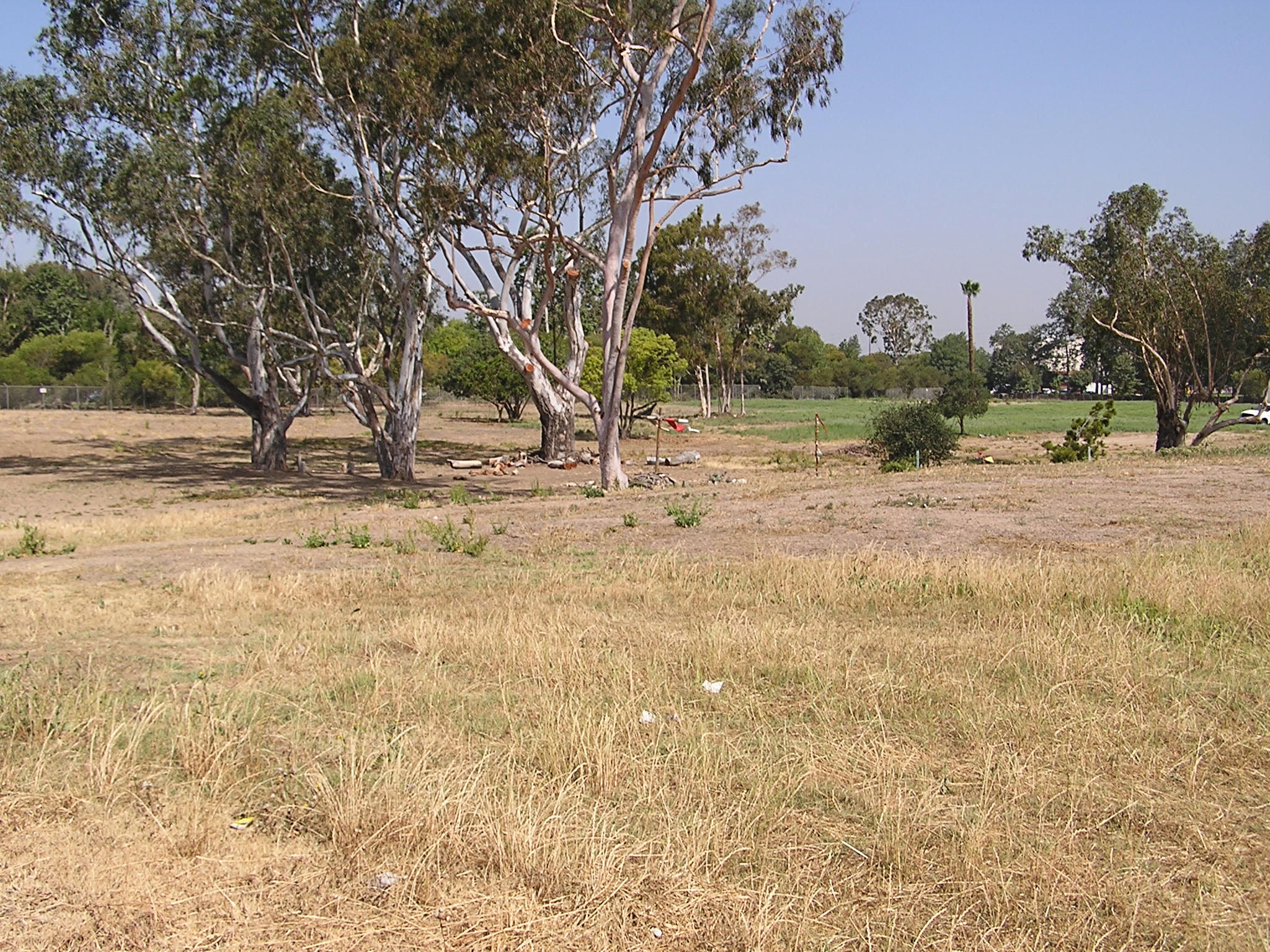
The site of Puvunga was listed on the National Register of Historic Places in 1974.

Indigenous people have lived in coastal Southern California for over 10,000 years, and several successive cultures have inhabited the present-day area of Long Beach. By the 16th-century arrival of Spanish explorers, the dominant group was the Tongva, who had established at least three major settlements within the present-day city. Tevaaxa'anga was an inland settlement near the Los Angeles River, while Ahwaanga and Povuu'nga were coastal villages. Povuu'nga was particularly important to the Tongva, not only as a regional trading center and hub for fishermen, but for its deep ceremonial significance, being understood as their place of emergence as a people from which their lives began.

=== Spanish and Mexican period ===
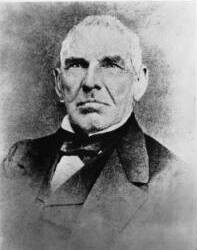
Don Juan Temple purchased Rancho Los Cerritos, covering modern-day Long Beach, in 1843.

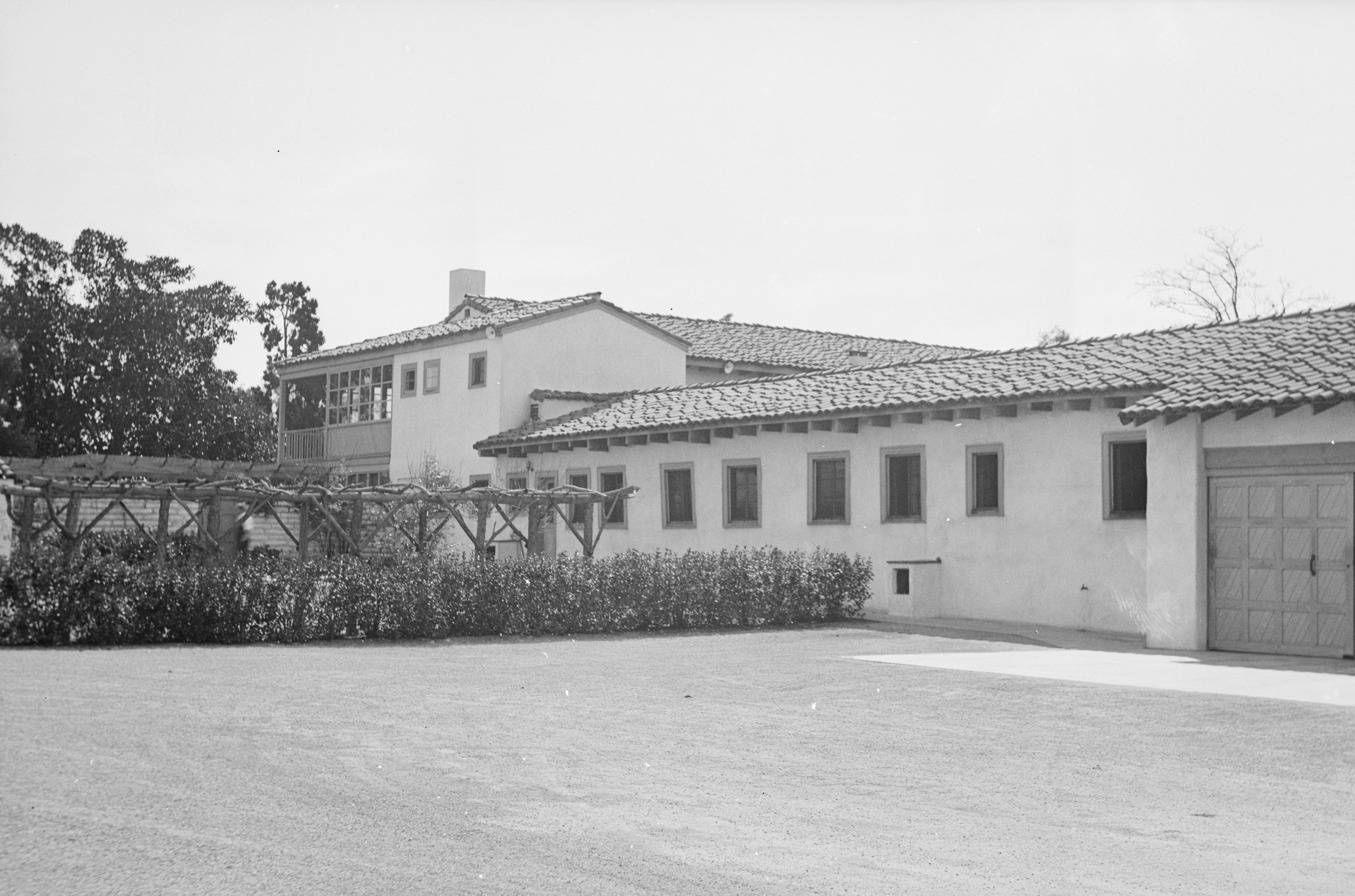
In 1844, Juan Temple built the Casa de los Cerritos, the oldest building in Long Beach, in a Monterey Colonial style.

In 1784, the Spanish Empire's King Carlos III granted Rancho Los Nietos to Spanish soldier Manuel Nieto. The Rancho Los Cerritos and Rancho Los Alamitos were divided from this territory. The boundary between the two ranchos ran through the center of Signal Hill on a southwest to northeast diagonal. A portion of western Long Beach was originally part of the Rancho San Pedro. Its boundaries were in dispute for years, due to flooding changing the Los Angeles River boundary between Rancho San Pedro and Rancho Los Nietos.

By 1805, what had been the major Tongva village of Puvunga was thoroughly depleted of villagers, most of whom were brought to Mission San Gabriel for conversion and as a labor force. Many villagers died at the mission, which had a high rate of death, particularly among children, attributed to many factors like diseases that spread quickly in the close quarters of the mission's walls, as well as torture, malnourishment, and overworking.

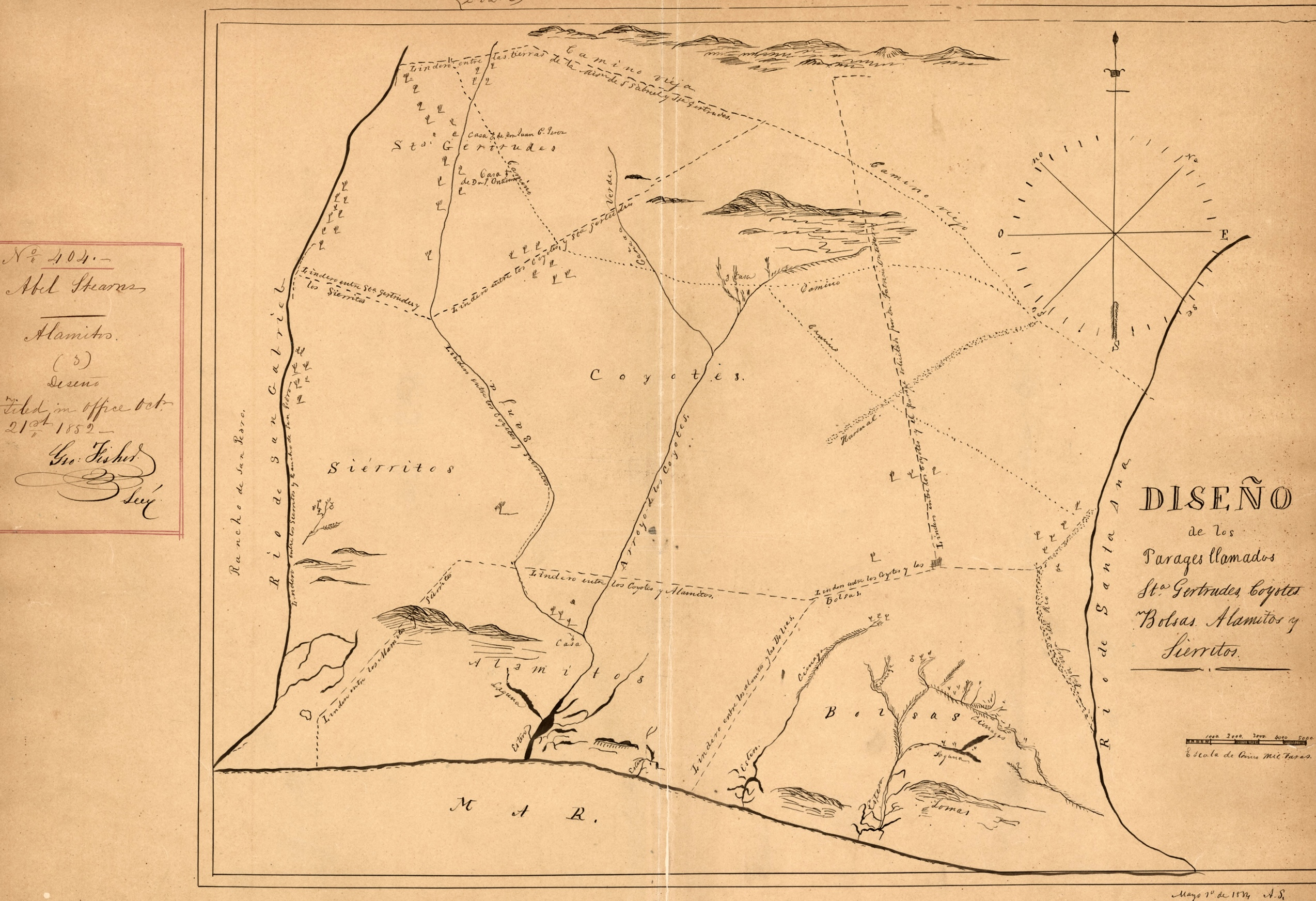
Diseño depicting Ranchos Los Alamitos, Los Cerritos, Santa Gertrudes, Los Coyotes, Las Bolsas, 1852

In 1843, Juan Temple bought Rancho Los Cerritos, having arrived in California in 1827 from New England. He built what is now known as the "Los Cerritos Ranch House", a still-standing adobe which is a National Historic Landmark. Temple created a thriving cattle ranch and prospered, becoming the wealthiest man in Los Angeles County. Both Temple and his ranch house played important local roles in the Mexican–American War. On an island in the San Pedro Bay, Mormon pioneers made an abortive attempt to establish a colony (as part of Brigham Young's plan to establish a continuous chain of settlements from the Pacific to Salt Lake).

=== Post-Conquest period ===
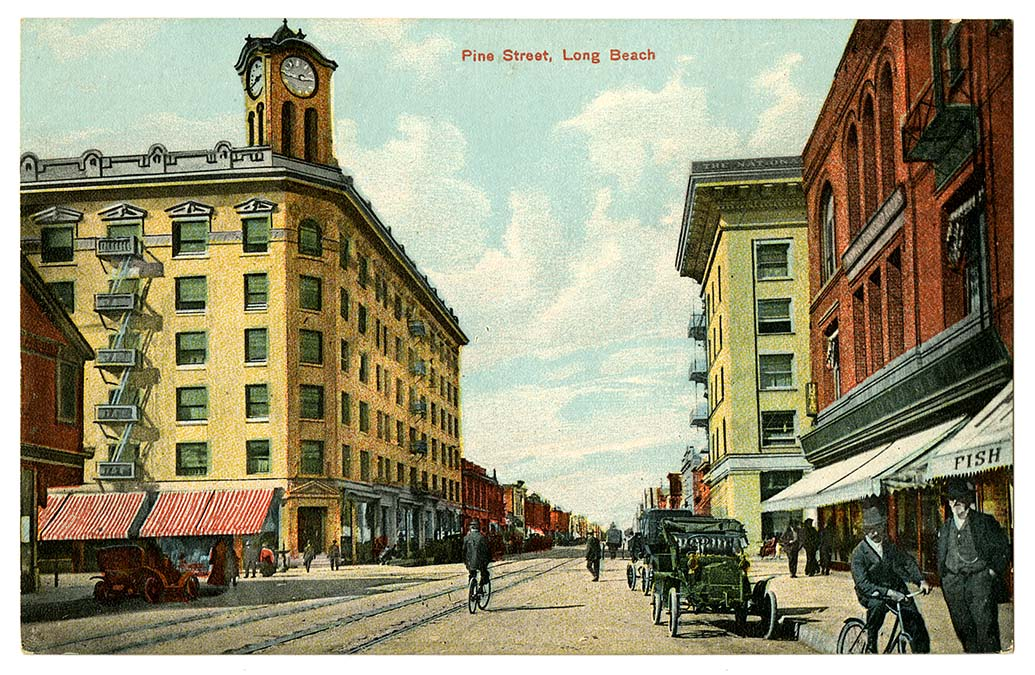
The First National Bank of Long Beach at the turn of the century

Following the U.S. Conquest of California, Temple had his Rancho Los Cerritos deeded to him by the Public Land Commission. In 1866, Temple sold Rancho Los Cerritos for $20,000 to the Northern California sheep-raising firm of Flint, Bixby & Company, which consisted of brothers Thomas and Benjamin Flint and their cousin Llewellyn Bixby. Two years previous Flint, Bixby & Co had also purchased along with Northern California associate James Irvine, three ranchos which would later become the city that bears Irvine's name. To manage Rancho Los Cerritos, the company selected Llewellyn's brother Jotham Bixby, the "Father of Long Beach". Three years later, Bixby bought into the property and would later form the Bixby Land Company. In the 1870s, as many as 30,000 sheep were kept at the ranch and sheared twice yearly to provide wool for trade. In 1880, Bixby sold 4,000 acres (16 km^{2}) of the Rancho Los Cerritos to William E. Willmore, who subdivided it in hopes of creating a farm community, Willmore City. He failed and was bought out by a Los Angeles syndicate that called itself the "Long Beach Land and Water Company". They changed the name of the community to Long Beach at that time.

=== Incorporation ===
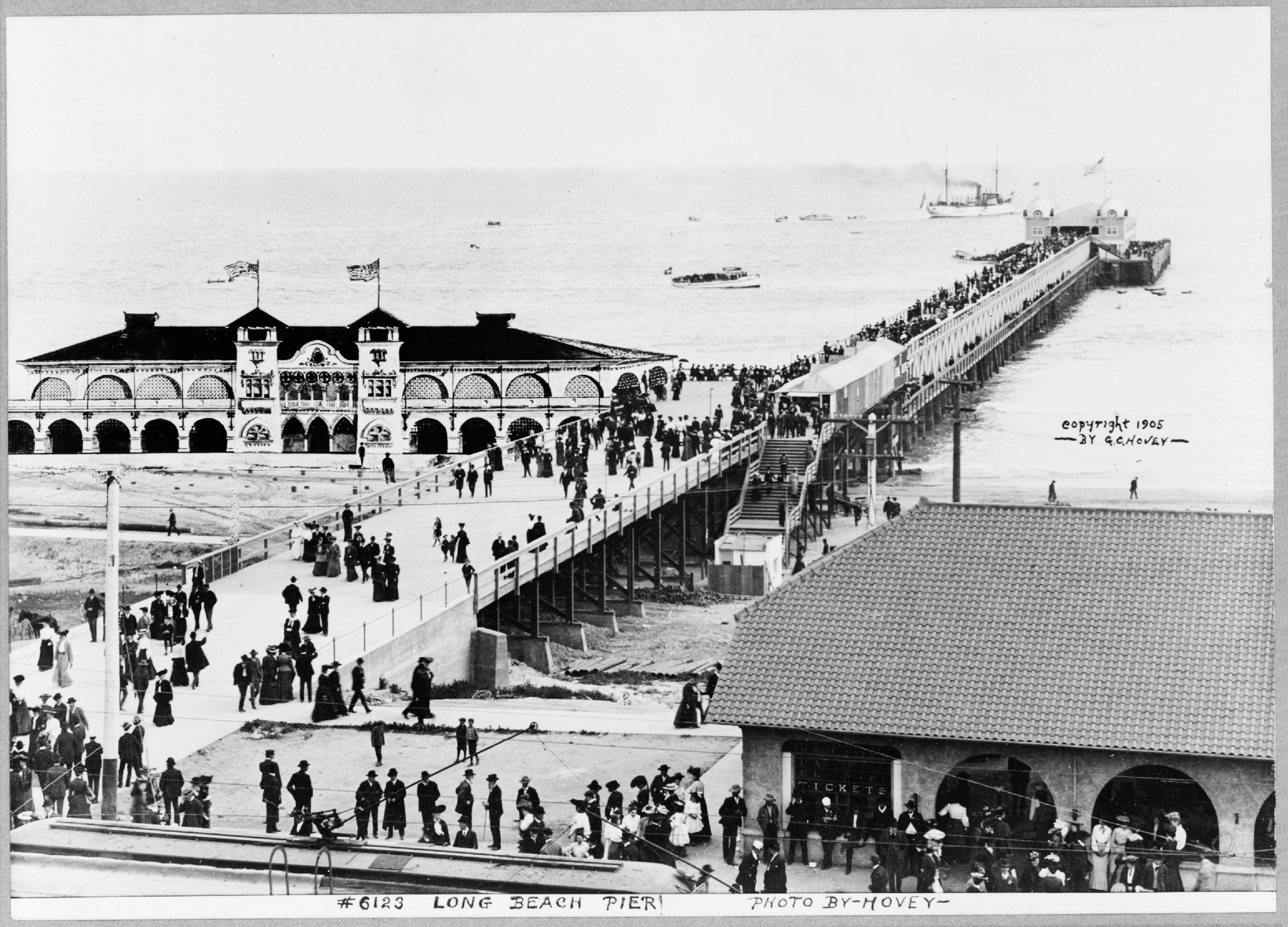
Long Beach pier, 1905

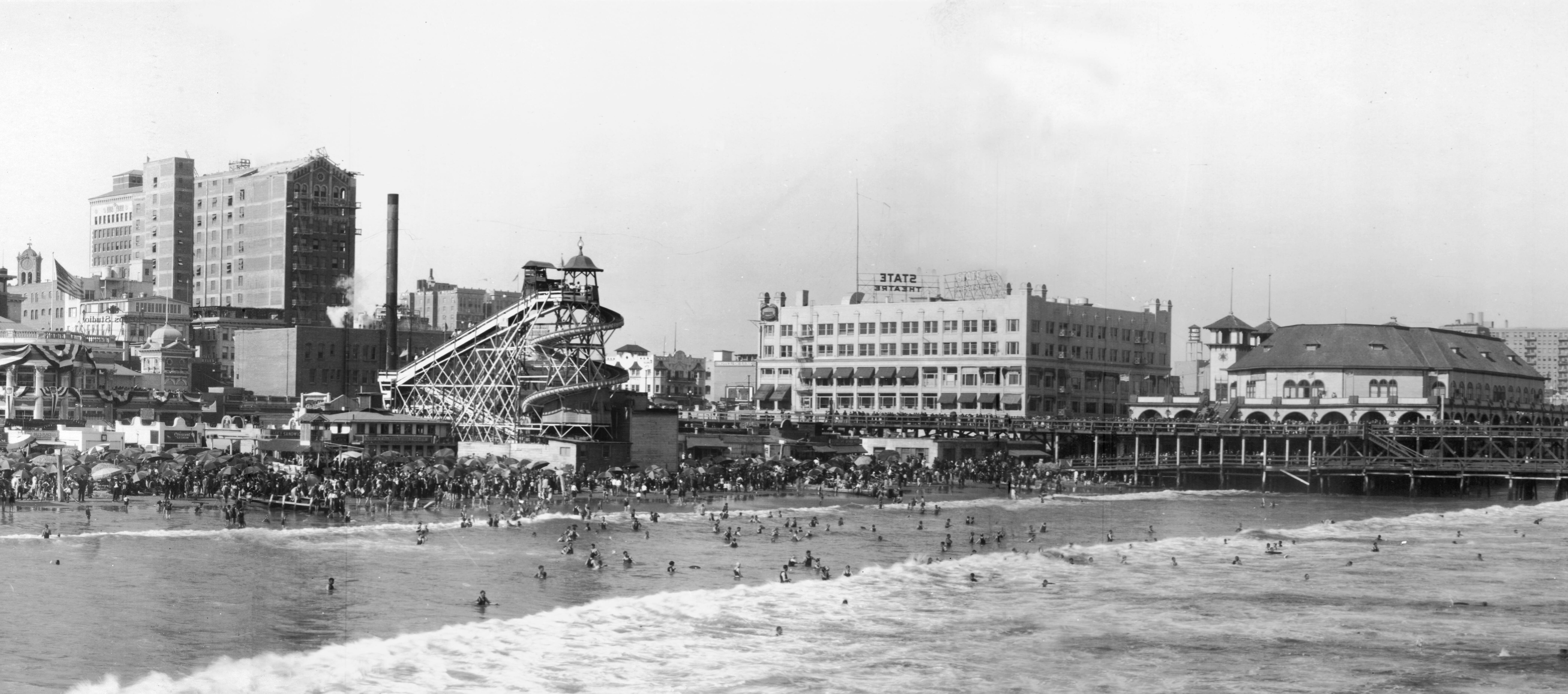
Long Beach pier, 1925

The City of Long Beach was officially incorporated in 1897. The town grew as a seaside resort with light agricultural uses. The Pike was the most famous beachside amusement zone on the West Coast from 1902 until 1969; it offered bathers food, games and rides, such at the Sky Wheel dual Ferris wheel and Cyclone Racer roller coaster. Gradually the oil industry, Navy shipyard and facilities and port became the mainstays of the city. Another Bixby cousin, John W. Bixby, was influential in the city. After first working for his cousins at Los Cerritos, J.W. Bixby leased land at Rancho Los Alamitos. He put together a group: banker I.W. Hellman, Llewellyn and Jotham Bixby, and him, to purchase the rancho. In addition to bringing innovative farming methods to the Alamitos (which under Abel Stearns in the late 1850s and early 1860s was once the largest cattle ranch in the US), J.W. Bixby began the development of the oceanfront property near the city's picturesque bluffs. Under the name Alamitos Land Company, J.W. Bixby named the streets and laid out the parks of his new city. This area would include Belmont Heights, Belmont Shore and Naples; it soon became a thriving community of its own. J.W. Bixby died in 1888 of apparent appendicitis. The Rancho Los Alamitos property was split up, with Hellman getting the southern third, Jotham and Llewellyn, the northern third, and J.W. Bixby's widow and heirs keeping the central third. The Alamitos townsite was kept as a separate entity, but at first, it was primarily run by Llewellyn and Jotham Bixby, although I.W, Hellman (who had the largest single share) had a significant veto power, an influence made even stronger as the J.W. Bixby heirs began to side with Hellman more and more.

Tragedy occurred on May 24, 1913 when the Pine Avenue Pier collapsed under the weight of a large crowd, causing 39 deaths.

When Jotham Bixby died in 1916, the remaining 3,500 acres (14 km^{2}) of Rancho Los Cerritos was subdivided into the neighborhoods of Bixby Knolls, California Heights, Los Cerritos, North Long Beach and part of the city of Signal Hill.

Pine Avenue near 4th became the center of a large shopping district. Besides upscale Buffums (1912; expanded 1926), in 1929 alone Barker Brothers, the Hugh A. Marti Co., and Wise Company and Famous department stores built large new stores, Walker's (1933), and nearby at American and 5th, Sears (1928) and Montgomery Ward (1929). It would remain popular until suburban malls sprung up starting in the 1950s. (see also: History of Retail in Southern California)

Oil was discovered in 1921 on Signal Hill, which split off as a separately incorporated city shortly afterward. The discovery of the Long Beach Oil Field, brought in by the gusher at the Alamitos oil well#1, made Long Beach a major oil producer; in the 1920s the field was the most productive in the world. In 1932, the even larger Wilmington Oil Field, fourth-largest in the United States, and which is mostly in Long Beach, was developed, contributing to the city's fame in the 1930s as an oil town.

The M6.4 1933 Long Beach earthquake caused significant damage to the city and surrounding areas, killing a total of 120 people. Most of the damage occurred in unreinforced masonry buildings, especially schools. Pacific Bible Seminary (now known as Hope International University) was forced to move classes out of First Christian Church of Long Beach and into a small local home due to damage.

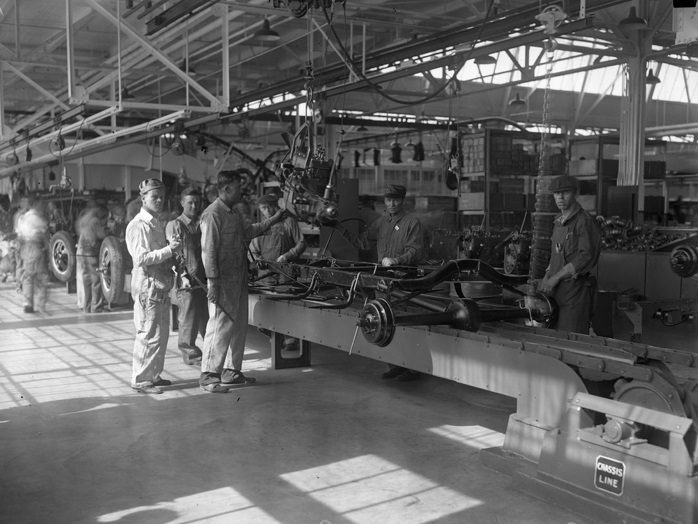
Ford's Long Beach Assembly in 1930

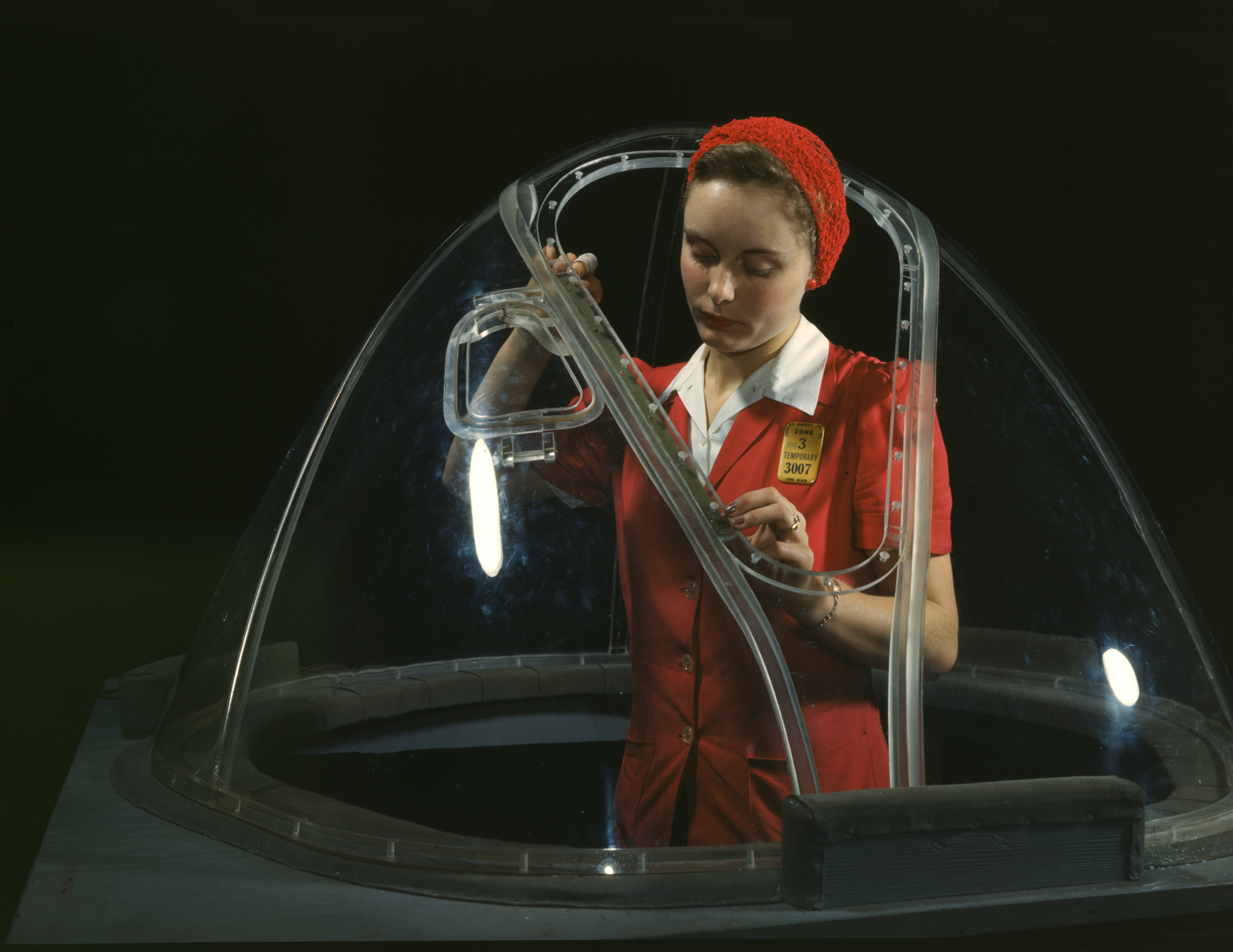
Worker in the Douglas Aircraft Company plant, Long Beach, 1942. Photo by Alfred T. Palmer.

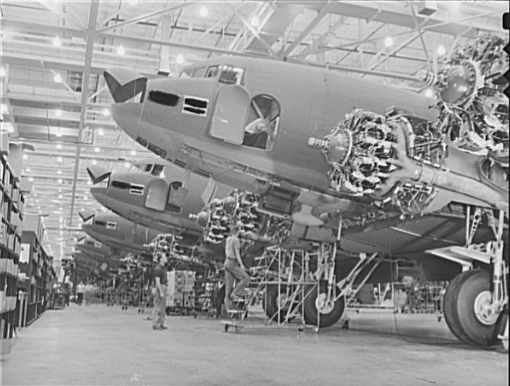
C-54 transport planes being built in the Douglas Aircraft Company plant in Long Beach during World War II

The Ford Motor Company built a factory called Long Beach Assembly at the then address in 1929 as "700 Henry Ford Avenue, Long Beach" where the factory began building the Ford Model A. Production of Ford vehicles continued after the war until 1960, when the plant was closed due to a fire, and January 1991 when the factory was demolished partially due to air quality remediation efforts. Ford had earlier opened a factory in Los Angeles at 12th Street and Olive, with a later factory built at East Seventh Street and Santa Fe Avenue after 1914.

Come 1938, the creation of Housing Authorities for both the City and County of Los Angeles were complete — and North Long Beach was to be home to the County Authority's first order of business: the Carmelitos Housing Project, Southern California's first affordable housing complex.

=== World War II and contemporary history ===
Long Beach, as a port city, had a relationship with the U.S. Navy even before the war. The city was part of the Battle of Los Angeles during World War II when observers for the United States Army Air Forces reported shells being fired from the sea. Anti-aircraft batteries fired into the night sky, although no planes were ever sighted.

Long Beach's population grew substantially during and after the war, with workers being needed for wartime manufacturing and G.I. bill recipients seeking out homes in California. Suburbs were built by the Bixby land companies and others. In the 1950s it was referred to as "Iowa by the sea", due to a large influx of people from that and other Midwestern states. Huge picnics for migrants from each state were a popular annual event in Long Beach until the 1960s.

Douglas Aircraft Company's largest facility was its Long Beach plant, totaling 1,422,350 square feet (132,141 m^{2}). The first plane rolled out the door on December 23, 1941. The plant produced C-47 Skytrain transports, B-17 Flying Fortress bombers, and A-20 Havoc attack bombers simultaneously. Douglas merged with the McDonnell Aircraft Company in 1967 where the Douglas DC-8 and the McDonnell Douglas DC-9 were built. In 1997 McDonnell Douglas merged with Boeing, which made C-17 Globemaster transport planes in Long Beach until the closure of the manufacturing facility in 2015.

Long Beach also saw an instance of the Chicano(a) movement in 1968.

== Geography ==
Long Beach is about 21 miles (34 km) south of downtown Los Angeles. According to the United States Census Bureau, the city has a total area of 77.84 square miles (201.6 km^{2}), of which 50.71 square miles (131.3 km^{2}) is land and 27.13 square miles (70.3 km^{2}) (34.9%) is water. Long Beach completely surrounds the city of Signal Hill.

=== Climate ===
Long Beach has a climate that can either be described as a hot semi-arid climate (BSh) or a hot-summer Mediterranean climate (Csa). In general, the city features hot summers and mild to warm winters with occasional rainfall. Days in Long Beach are mostly sunny, as in Southern California in general. Temperatures recorded at the weather station at the Long Beach Airport, 4.0 miles (6.4 km) inland from the ocean, range more greatly than those along the immediate coast. During the summer months, low clouds and fog occur frequently, developing overnight and blanketing the area on many mornings. This fog usually clears by the afternoon, and a westerly sea breeze often develops, keeping temperatures mild. Heat and high humidity can sometimes coincide in summer, which may cause discomfort due to the heat index.

According to data analysis provided by the NWS, The annual average temperature of Long Beach is 64.9 °F (18.3 °C), of which August is the hottest month with an average temperature of 74.3 °F (23.5 °C), while December is the coldest month with an average temperature of 56.7 °F (13.7 °C). In terms of temperature, Long Beach and other California cities such as Los Angeles and San Francisco have the hottest month of the year usually in August and the coolest month in December. Long Beach has 23 days of afternoon temperatures above 90 °F (32.2 °C) each year, and about two days a year are above 100 °F (37.8 °C).

Climate chart for Long Beach

Long Beach's location directly east of the Palos Verdes Peninsula, paired with its south facing coastline, results in the city sometimes experiencing different weather patterns than the Los Angeles metropolitan area coastal communities to the northwest and southeast of Long Beach, which largely have west facing coastlines. The 1200 ft Palos Verdes hills block west to east airflow and a significant amount of the coastal moisture that marks other coastal cities, such as Manhattan Beach, Santa Monica, and Newport Beach.

As in most locations in Southern California, most rainfall in Long Beach occurs during the winter months. Storms can bring heavy rainfall. The annual precipitation in Long Beach is 12.02 inches (305.3 mm), of which the precipitation from December to March of the following year accounts for 81% of the whole year. June to September is usually rainless, especially August.

Climate data for Long Beach, California (Long Beach Airport), 1991–2020 normals, extremes 1958–present
Month	Jan	Feb	Mar	Apr	May	Jun	Jul	Aug	Sep	Oct	Nov	Dec	Year
Record high °F (°C)	93 (34)	92 (33)	98 (37)	105 (41)	104 (40)	109 (43)	109 (43)	105 (41)	111 (44)	111 (44)	101 (38)	92 (33)	111 (44)
Mean maximum °F (°C)	83.1 (28.4)	82.4 (28.0)	84.9 (29.4)	89.4 (31.9)	89.4 (31.9)	89.4 (31.9)	93.0 (33.9)	95.9 (35.5)	99.7 (37.6)	95.5 (35.3)	89.4 (31.9)	80.1 (26.7)	102.1 (38.9)
Mean daily maximum °F (°C)	67.4 (19.7)	66.8 (19.3)	68.6 (20.3)	71.4 (21.9)	73.1 (22.8)	76.1 (24.5)	81.4 (27.4)	83.2 (28.4)	82.4 (28.0)	77.7 (25.4)	72.5 (22.5)	66.7 (19.3)	73.9 (23.3)
Daily mean °F (°C)	57.1 (13.9)	57.6 (14.2)	59.9 (15.5)	62.7 (17.1)	65.5 (18.6)	68.7 (20.4)	73.1 (22.8)	74.3 (23.5)	73.1 (22.8)	68.4 (20.2)	62.0 (16.7)	56.7 (13.7)	64.9 (18.3)
Mean daily minimum °F (°C)	46.9 (8.3)	48.4 (9.1)	51.2 (10.7)	53.9 (12.2)	57.9 (14.4)	61.3 (16.3)	64.9 (18.3)	65.5 (18.6)	63.9 (17.7)	59.1 (15.1)	51.6 (10.9)	46.6 (8.1)	55.9 (13.3)
Mean minimum °F (°C)	38.7 (3.7)	40.2 (4.6)	43.4 (6.3)	47.2 (8.4)	52.6 (11.4)	56.8 (13.8)	60.7 (15.9)	61.2 (16.2)	58.3 (14.6)	51.8 (11.0)	43.2 (6.2)	37.9 (3.3)	36.4 (2.4)
Record low °F (°C)	25 (−4)	33 (1)	33 (1)	38 (3)	40 (4)	47 (8)	51 (11)	55 (13)	50 (10)	39 (4)	34 (1)	28 (−2)	25 (−4)
Average precipitation inches (mm)	2.89 (73)	3.02 (77)	1.65 (42)	0.56 (14)	0.26 (6.6)	0.07 (1.8)	0.05 (1.3)	0.01 (0.25)	0.08 (2.0)	0.53 (13)	0.75 (19)	2.15 (55)	12.02 (305)
Average precipitation days (≥ 0.01 in)	6.0	6.5	5.5	2.9	1.6	0.7	0.6	0.1	0.5	2.3	3.1	5.2	35.0
Average relative humidity (%)	64.7	66.9	67.2	65.4	68.2	69.6	68.3	68.5	69.2	67.6	67.1	66.2	67.4
Average dew point °F (°C)	41.4 (5.2)	43.9 (6.6)	45.3 (7.4)	47.1 (8.4)	52.0 (11.1)	55.6 (13.1)	59.2 (15.1)	60.6 (15.9)	58.8 (14.9)	53.4 (11.9)	46.9 (8.3)	42.1 (5.6)	50.5 (10.3)
Source 1: NOAA (dew points and relative humidity 1961–1990)
Source 2: National Weather Service

=== Neighborhoods ===
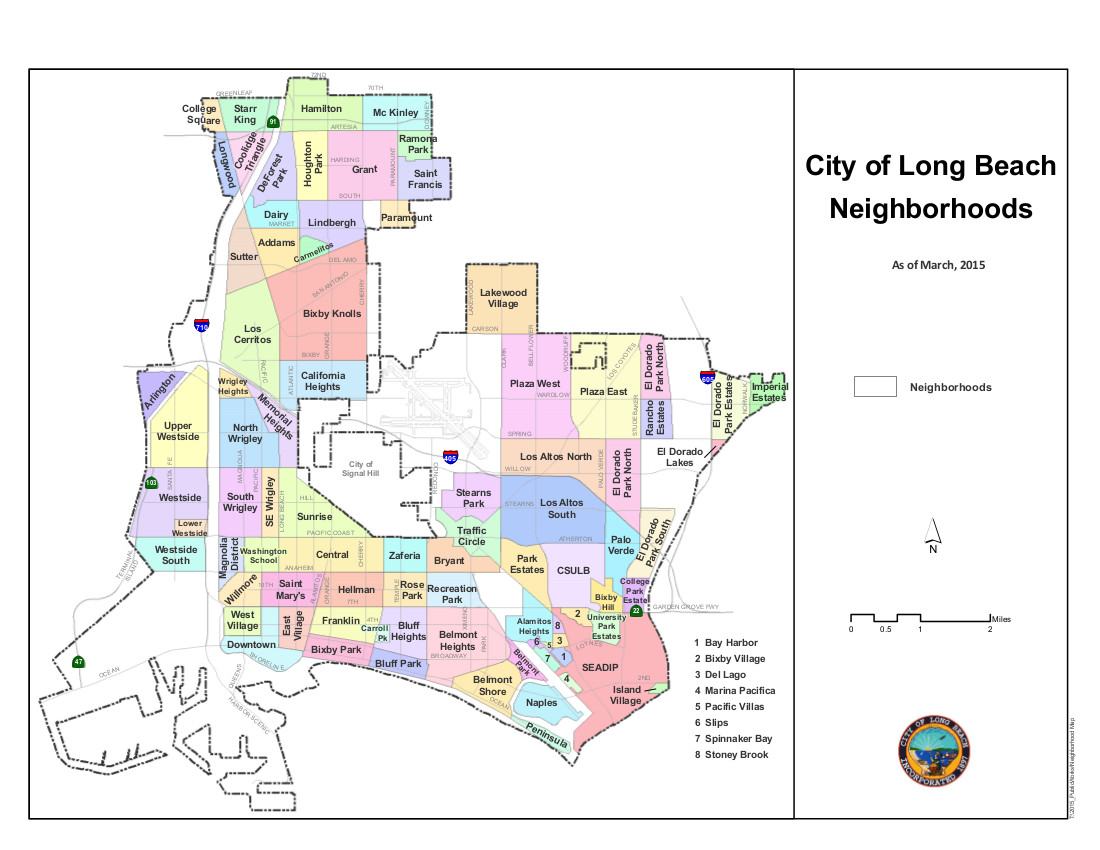
Neighborhood map of the City of Long Beach

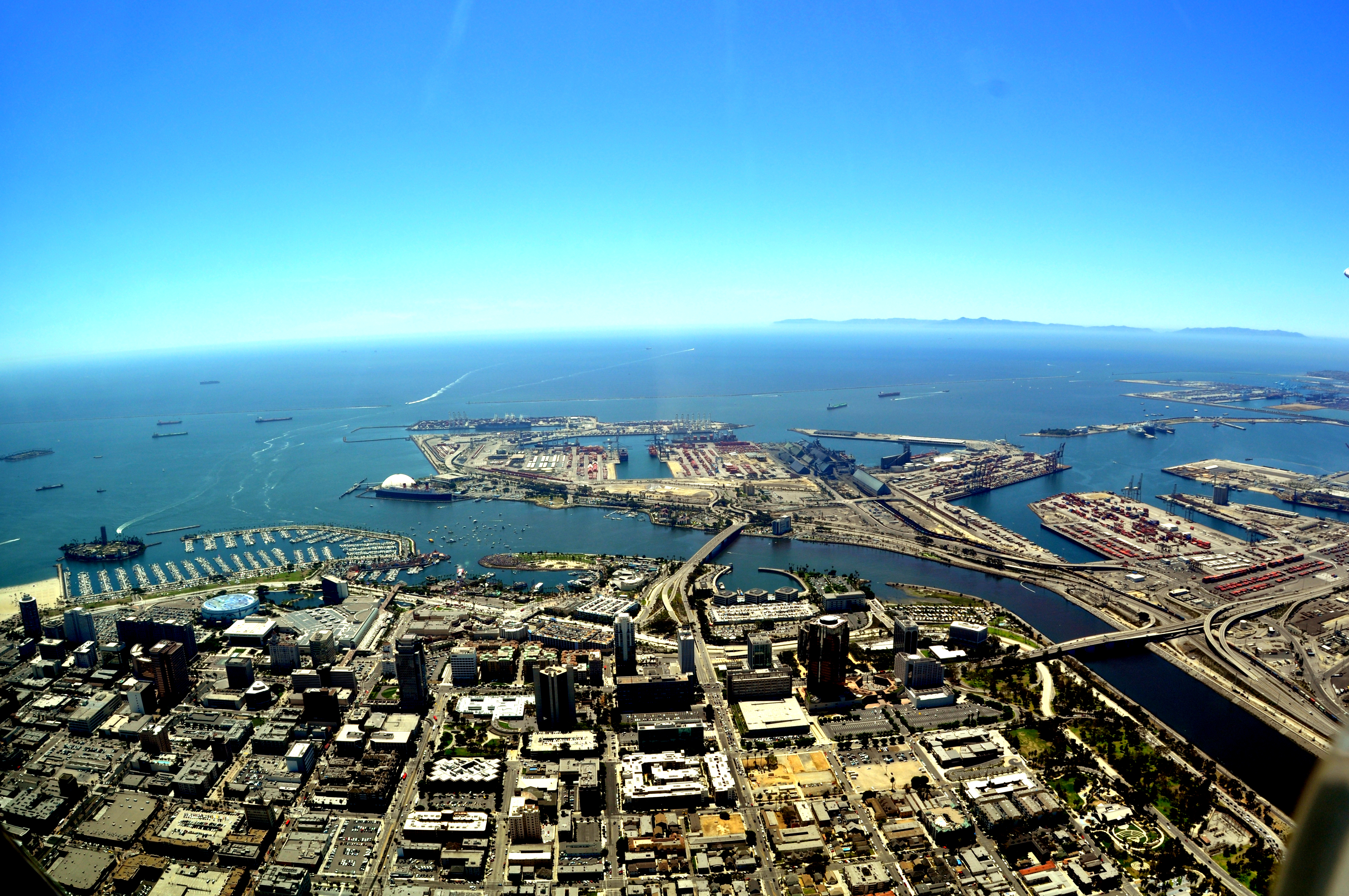
Downtown, Shoreline Marina, and the Port of Long Beach, 2010

Long Beach is composed of many different neighborhoods. Some neighborhoods are named after thoroughfares, while others are named for nearby parks, schools, or city features.

=== Environment ===
==== Pollution ====
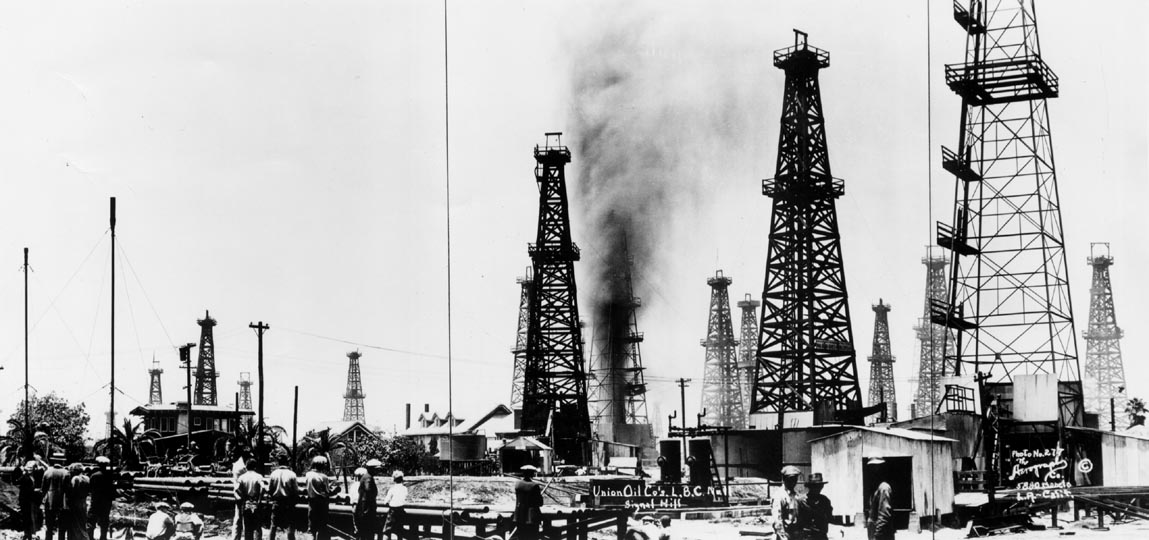
Oil field in Long Beach, 1920

Long Beach suffers from some of the worst air pollution in the entire United States. Most of the city is in proximity to the twin ports of Los Angeles and Long Beach, and the prevailing westerly-to-west-south-westerly winds bring a large portion of the twin ports' air pollution directly into Long Beach before dispersing it northward then eastward. Heavy pollution sources at the ports include the ships themselves, which burn high-sulfur, high-soot-producing bunker fuel to maintain internal electrical power while docked, as well as heavy diesel pollution from drayage trucks at the ports, and short-haul tractor-trailer trucks ferrying cargo from the ports to inland warehousing, rail yards, and shipping centers. Long-term average levels of toxic air pollutants (and the corresponding carcinogenic risk they create) can be two to three times higher in and around Long Beach, and in downwind areas to the east, than in other parts of the Los Angeles metropolitan area, such as the Westside, San Fernando Valley, or San Gabriel Valley. While overall regional pollution in the Los Angeles metropolitan area has declined in the last decade, pollution levels remain dangerously high in much of Long Beach due to the port pollution, with diesel exhaust from ships, trains, and trucks as the largest sources.

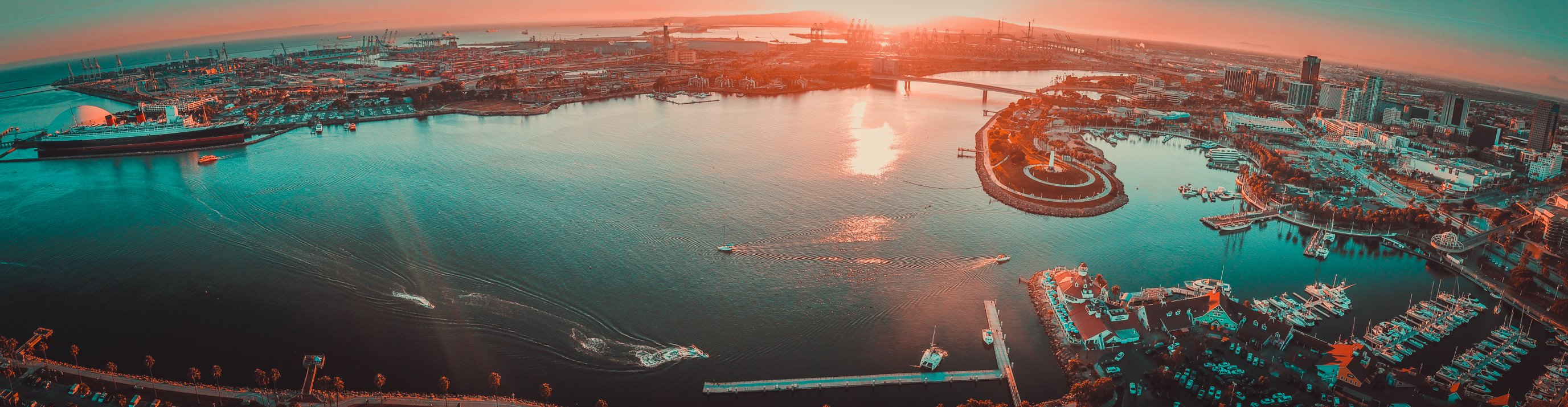
Panoramic view of Long Beach

Additionally, Long Beach is directly downwind of several of the South Bay oil refineries. Any refinery process or chemical upset that results in the atmospheric release of refinery by-products (commonly sulfur dioxide) will usually impact air quality in Long Beach due to the west-south-westerly prevailing wind.

Similarly, the water quality in the Long Beach portion of San Pedro Bay, which is enclosed by the Federal Breakwater, commonly ranks among the poorest on the entire West Coast during rainy periods. Long Beach beaches average a D or F grade on beach water quality during rainy periods in the Beach Report Card published by Heal the Bay. However, during dry periods the water may have an A or B rating in the same reports. The Los Angeles River discharges directly into the Long Beach side of San Pedro Bay, meaning a large portion of all the urban runoff from the entire Los Angeles metropolitan area pours directly into the harbor water. This runoff contains most of the debris, garbage, chemical pollutants, and biological pathogens washed into storm drains in every upstream city each time it rains. Because the breakwater prevents tidal flushing and wave action, these pollutants build up in the harbor. The water enclosed by the breakwater, along most of the city's beaches, can be subject to red tides due to this stagnation as well. Because of these factors, the water in Long Beach is sometimes unsafe for swimming, up to weeks each year.

==== Ecology ====
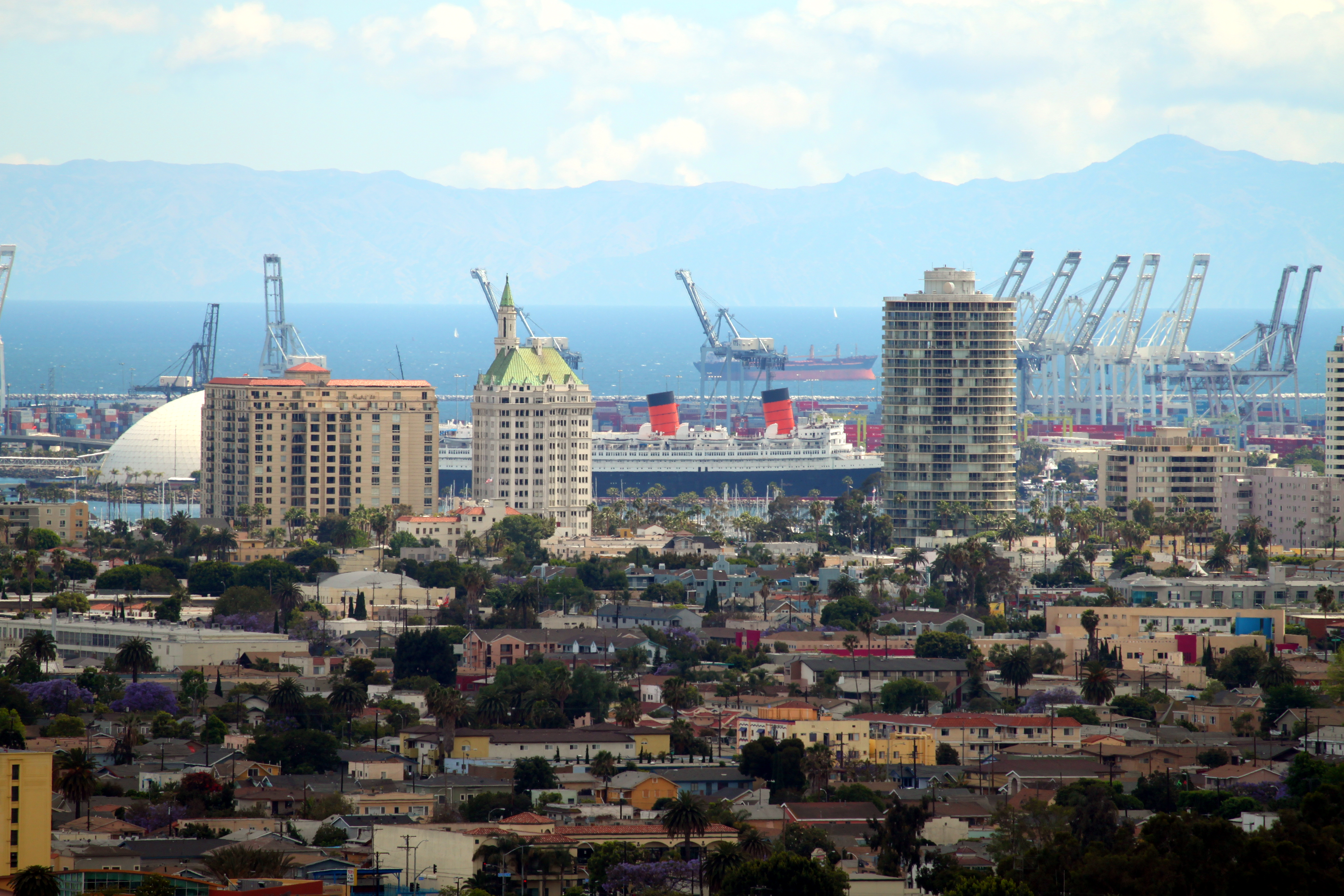
View from Signal Hill to Villa Riviera and port cranes (c. 2009)

The area has historically included several ecological communities, with coastal scrub dominating.

== Demographics ==
The top five countries of origin for Long Beach's immigrants are Mexico, the Philippines, Cambodia, El Salvador and Vietnam. The most common international languages spoken in Long Beach are Spanish, Khmer and Tagalog. There is a Mexican American/Chicano community in Long Beach. Cambodian people and Filipino Americans also settled in Long Beach. There is a Buddhist community in Long Beach. Christianity is the most common religion.

Historical population
Census	Pop.	Note	%±
1890	564		—
1900	2,252		299.3%
1910	17,809		690.8%
1920	55,593		212.2%
1930	142,032		155.5%
1940	164,271		15.7%
1950	250,767		52.7%
1960	344,168		37.2%
1970	358,633		4.2%
1980	361,334		0.8%
1990	429,433		18.8%
2000	461,522		7.5%
2010	462,257		0.2%
2020	466,742		1.0%
2025 (est.)	450,469	▼	−3.5%
U.S. Decennial Census; 2010–2020

Historical Demographic profile	2019	2010	1990	1970	1950
White	52.3%	46.1%	58.4%	91.8%	97.4%
—Non-Hispanic Whites	28.4%	29.4%	49.5%	86.2%	N/A
Black or African American	11.3%	13.5%	13.7%	5.3%	1.7%
Hispanic or Latino (of any race)	43.2%	40.8%	23.6%	6.0%	N/A
Asian	11.8%	12.9%	13.6%	1.9%	0.7%

=== 2022 ===
As of the 2022 American Community Survey estimates, there were 451,319 people and 170,965 households. The population density was 8,906.7 inhabitants per square mile (3,438.9/km^{2}). There were 181,251 housing units at an average density of 3,576.9 per square mile (1,381.0/km^{2}). The racial makeup of the city was 34.6% White, 20.1% some other race, 12.5% Asian, 11.8% Black or African American, 1.8% Native American or Alaskan Native, and 1.0% Native Hawaiian or Other Pacific Islander, with 18.2% from two or more races. Hispanics or Latinos of any race were 44.0% of the population.

Of the 170,965 households, 27.2% had children under the age of 18 living with them, 25.9% had seniors 65 years or older living with them, 35.6% were married couples living together, 9.7% were couples cohabitating, 22.3% had a male householder with no partner present, and 32.5% had a female householder with no partner present. The median household size was 2.57 and the median family size was 3.34.

The age distribution was 20.0% under 18, 10.2% from 18 to 24, 30.7% from 25 to 44, 25.6% from 45 to 64, and 13.6% who were 65 or older. The median age was 36.7 years. For every 100 females, there were 97.5 males.

The median income for a household was $80,493, with family households having a median income of $96,970 and non-family households $56,245. The per capita income was $41,896. Out of the 443,634 people with a determined poverty status, 13.8% were below the poverty line. Further, 17.9% of minors and 16.2% of seniors were below the poverty line.

In the survey, residents self-identified with various ethnic ancestries. People of German descent made up 6.0% of the population of the town, followed by English at 5.2%, Irish at 5.0%, Italian at 3.1%, American at 1.8%, Polish at 1.3%, French at 1.1%, Scottish at 1.1%, Sub-Saharan African at 0.8%, Swedish at 0.7%, Greek at 0.6%, Scotch-Irish at 0.6%, Caribbean (excluding Hispanics) at 0.6%, Russian at 0.5%, Dutch at 0.5%, Danish at 0.5%, and Norwegian at 0.5%.

=== 2020 ===
Long Beach, California – Racial and ethnic composition Note: the US Census treats Hispanic/Latino as an ethnic category. This table excludes Latinos from the racial categories and assigns them to a separate category. Hispanics/Latinos may be of any race.
Race / Ethnicity (NH = Non-Hispanic)	Pop 1980	Pop 1990	Pop 2000	Pop 2010	Pop 2020	% 1980	% 1990	% 2000	% 2010	% 2020
White alone (NH)	246,110	212,755	152,899	135,698	121,970	68.11%	49.54%	33.13%	29.36%	26.13%
Black or African American alone (NH)	39,864	56,805	66,836	59,925	55,894	11.03%	13.23%	14.48%	12.96%	11.98%
Native American or Alaska Native alone (NH)	3,029	2,231	1,772	1,349	1,119	0.84%	0.52%	0.38%	0.29%	0.24%
Asian alone (NH)	20,729	55,234	54,937	58,268	59,308	5.74%	12.86%	11.90%	12.61%	12.71%
Pacific Islander alone (NH)	20,729	55,234	5,392	4,915	3,937	5.74%	12.86%	1.17%	1.06%	0.84%
Other race alone (NH)	1,152	989	1,013	1,118	2,736	0.32%	0.23%	0.22%	0.24%	0.59%
Mixed race or Multiracial (NH)	x	x	13,581	12,572	19,781	x	x	2.94%	2.72%	4.24%
Hispanic or Latino (any race)	50,450	101,419	165,092	188,412	201,997	13.96%	23.62%	35.77%	40.76%	43.28%
Total	361,334	429,433	461,522	462,257	466,742	100.00%	100.00%	100.00%	100.00%	100.00%

=== 2010 ===
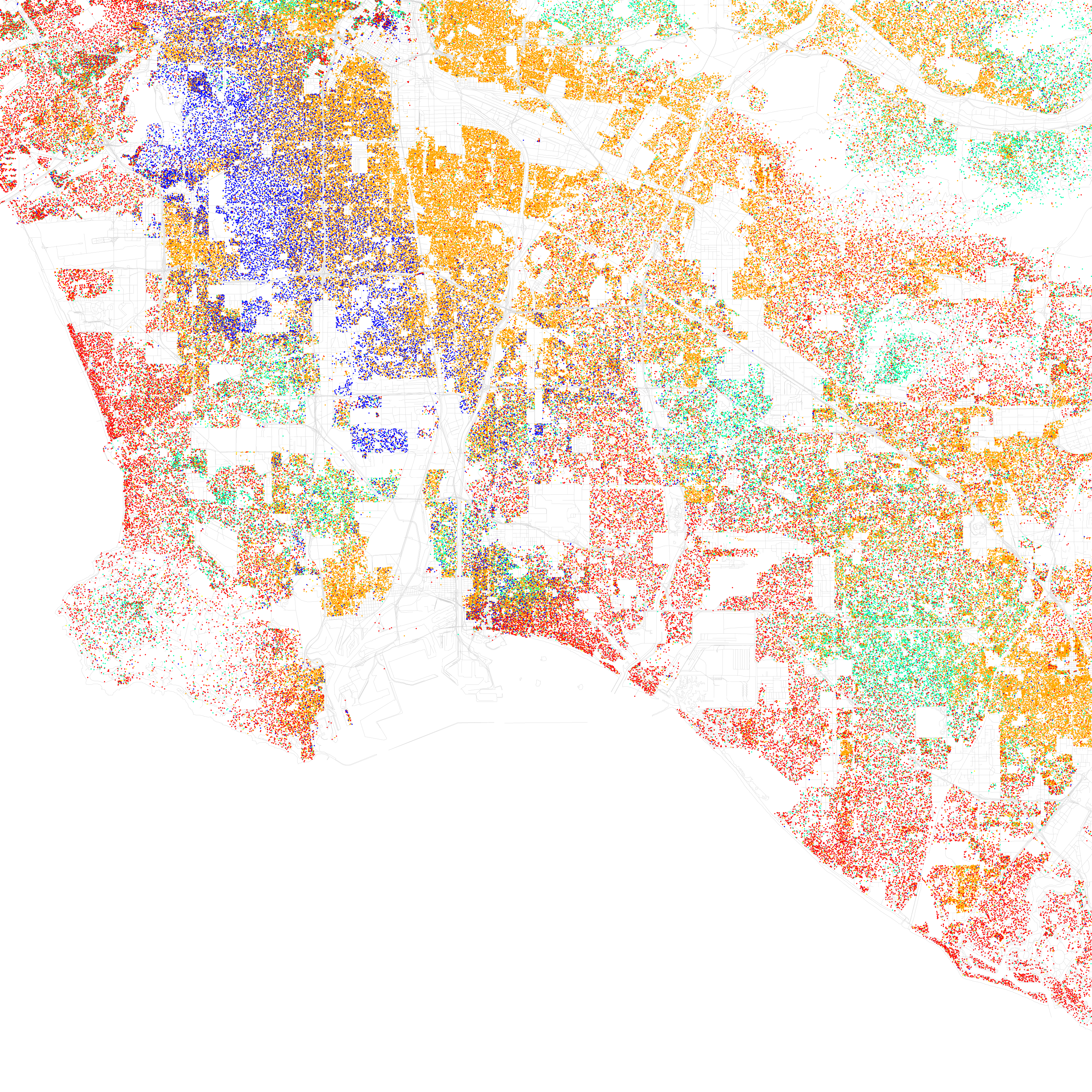
Map of ethnic distribution in Long Beach, 2010 U.S. Census. Each dot is 25 people: ⬤ Non-Hispanic White ⬤ Black ⬤ Asian ⬤ Hispanic ⬤ Other

The 2010 United States census reported that Long Beach had a population of 462,257. The population density was . The racial makeup of Long Beach was 213,066 (46.1%) White, 62,603 (13.5%) Black or African American, 3,458 (0.7%) Native American, 59,496 (12.9%) Asian (4.5% Filipino, 3.9% Cambodian, 0.9% Vietnamese, 0.6% Chinese, 0.6% Japanese, 0.4% Indian, 0.4% Korean, 0.2% Thai, 0.1% Laotian, 0.1% Hmong), 5,253 (1.1%) Pacific Islander (0.8% Samoan, 0.1% Guamanian, 0.1% Tongan), 93,930 (20.3%) from other races, and 24,451 (5.3%) from two or more races. Hispanic or Latino of any race were 188,412 persons (40.8%). 32.9% of the city's population was of Mexican heritage. Non-Hispanic Whites were 29.4% of the population in 2010, down from 86.2% in 1970.

The ethnic Cambodian population of approximately 20,000 is the largest outside of Asia.

The Census reported 453,980 people (98.2% of the population) lived in households, 5,321 (1.2%) lived in non-institutionalized group quarters, and 2,956 (0.6%) were institutionalized.

There were 163,531 households, out of which 58,073 (35.5%) had children under the age of 18 living in them, 61,850 (37.8%) were opposite-sex married couples living together, 26,781 (16.4%) had a female householder with no husband present, 10,598 (6.5%) had a male householder with no wife present. There were 12,106 (7.4%) unmarried opposite-sex partnerships, and 3,277 (2.0%) same-sex married couples or partnerships. Of the households, 46,536 (28.5%) were made up of individuals, and 11,775 (7.2%) had someone living alone who was 65 years of age or older. The average household size was 2.78. There were 99,229 families (60.7% of all households); the average family size was 3.52.

The age distribution of the city was as follows: 115,143 people (24.9%) were under the age of 18, 54,163 people (11.7%) aged 18 to 24, 140,910 people (30.5%) aged 25 to 44, 109,206 people (23.6%) aged 45 to 64, and 42,835 people (9.3%) who were 65 years of age or older. The median age was 33.2 years. For every 100 females, there were 96.1 males. For every 100 females age 18 and over, there were 93.8 males.

There were 176,032 dwelling units at an average density of 3,422.2 per square mile (1,321.3/km^{2}), of which 67,949 (41.6%) were owner-occupied, and 95,582 (58.4%) were occupied by renters. The homeowner vacancy rate was 2.0%; the rental vacancy rate was 7.2%. 195,254 people (42.2% of the population) lived in owner-occupied housing units and 258,726 people (56.0%) lived in rental housing units.

During 2009–2013, Long Beach had a median household income of $52,711, with 20.2% of the population living below the federal poverty line.

As of 2014, the population of Long Beach was 473,577.

=== 2000 ===
As of the census of 2000, there were 461,522 people, 163,088 households, and 99,646 families residing in the city. The population density was 9,149.8 inhabitants per square mile (3,532.8 inhabitants/km^{2}). There were 171,632 dwelling units at an average density of 3,402.6 per square mile (1,313.8/km^{2}). The racial makeup of the city was 45.2% White, 14.9% Black or African American (U.S. Census), 0.8% Native American, 12.1% Asian, 1.2% Pacific Islander, 20.6% from other races, and 5.3% from two or more races. Hispanic or Latino people of any race were 35.8% of the population.

The city has changed since the 1950s, when its population was predominantly European-American and the city was nicknamed "Iowa by the Sea" or "Iowa under Palm Trees" as it had a slower pace than neighboring Los Angeles. In 1950, whites represented 97.4% of Long Beach's population. Since the second half of the 20th century, the city has been a major port of entry for Asian and Latin American immigrants headed to Los Angeles. The Harbor section of downtown Long Beach was once home to people of Dutch, Greek, Italian, Maltese, Portuguese and Spanish ancestry, most of them employed in manufacturing and fish canneries until the 1960s.

According to a report by USA Today in 2000, Long Beach is the most ethnically diverse large city in the United States. It has a relatively high proportion of Pacific Islanders (over 1% as of the 2000 Census), from Samoa and Tonga. Most American Indians, about 0.8% of the city's population, arrived during the Department of the Interior's Bureau of Indian Affairs urban relocation programs in the 1950s.

Long Beach once had a sizable Japanese American population, which largely worked in the fish canneries on Terminal Island and on small truck farms in the area. In 1942, not long after the Attack on Pearl Harbor and subsequent Japanese declaration of war on the United States and the British Empire, President Franklin D. Roosevelt issued United States Executive Order 9066 which allowed military commanders to designate areas "from which any or all persons may be excluded". Under this order, all Japanese and Americans of Japanese ancestry were categorically removed from Western coastal regions and sent to internment camps, without regard for due process.

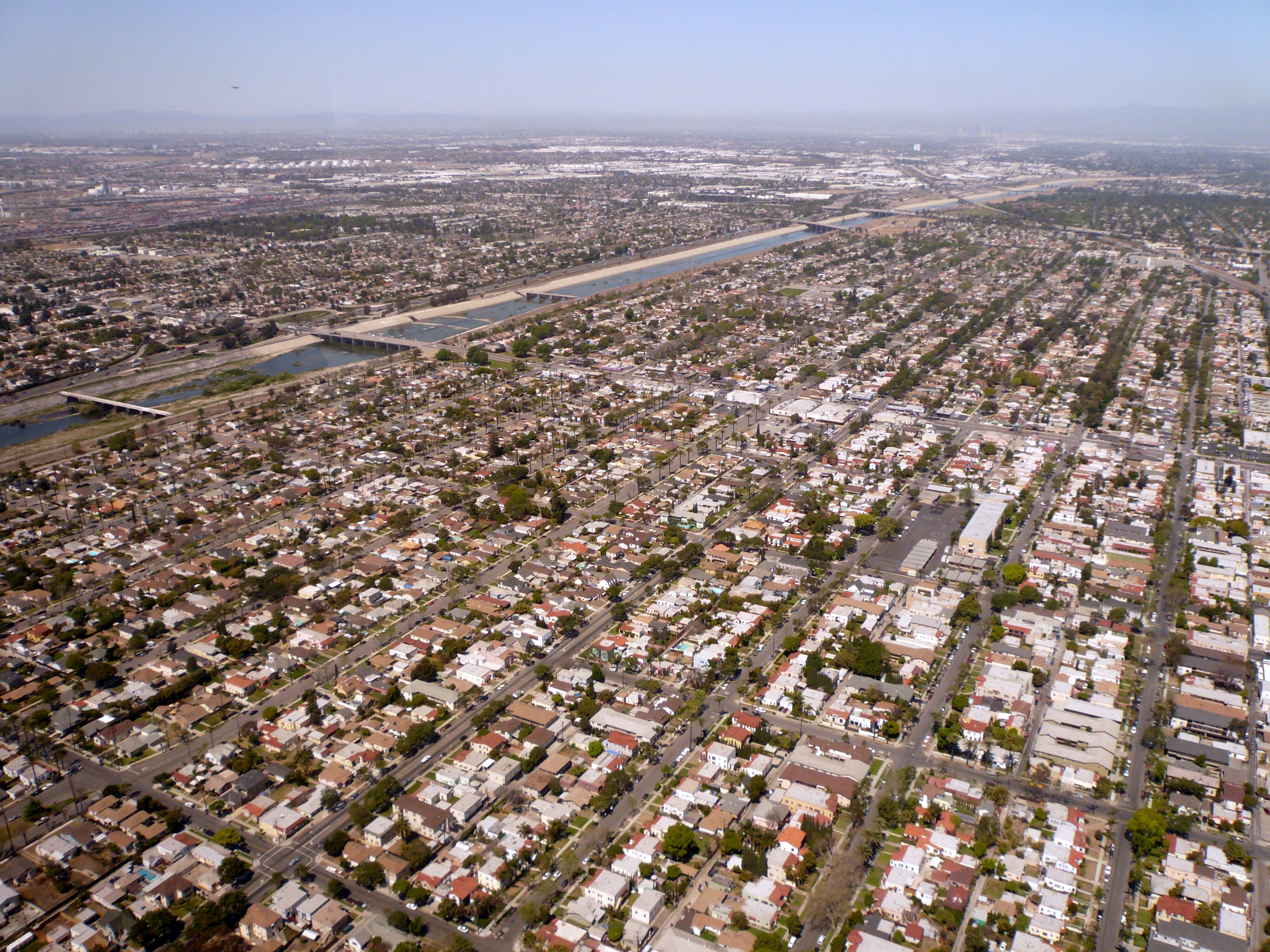
The Wrigley neighborhood

24,000 Jews live in Long Beach. Jews are concentrated in Rossmor, Los Alamitos, Seal Beach, and Lakewood in the Greater Long Beach area.

As of the 2000 census, there were 163,088 households, out of which 35.0% had children under the age of 18 living with them, 39.2% were married couples living together, 16.1% had a female householder with no husband present, and 38.9% were non-families. Of all households, 29.6% were made up of individuals, and 7.4% had someone living alone who was 65 years of age or older. The average household size was 2.77 and the average family size was 3.55.

In the city, 29.2% of the population was under the age of 18, 10.9% from 18 to 24, 32.9% from 25 to 44, 18.0% from 45 to 64, and 9.1% was 65 years of age or older. The median age was 31 years. For every 100 females, there were 96.6 males. For every 100 females age 18 and over, there were 93.5 males.

The median income for a household in the city was $37,270, and the median income for a family was $40,002. Males had a median income of $36,807 versus $31,975 for females. The per capita income for the city was $19,040. About 19.3% of families and 22.8% of the population were below the poverty line, including 32.7% of those under age 18 and 11.0% of those age 65 or over. In 2008, the Census Bureau showed the number of people living below the poverty line had dropped to 18.2%.

The most commonly reported ancestries of Long Beach residents were Mexican (28.1%) and German (5.5%), according to the 2000 census. Mexico (51.0%) and the Philippines (10.3%) were the most common foreign places of birth.

=== Homelessness ===
In 2022, the Long Beach's point-in-time Homeless Count counted 3,296 homeless individuals in the city.

Homeless population
Year	Pop.	±%
2015	2,345	—
2017	1,863	−20.6%
2019	1,894	+1.7%
2020	2,034	+7.4%
2022	3,296	+62.0%
Source: Long Beach Homeless Count

== Economy ==
The economic base has changed over the years. Oil extraction created a boom and continues to fund portions of the city budget. Long Beach was a Navy town for many years before the base closed. The aerospace industry played an important role. Douglas Aircraft Company (later McDonnell Douglas and now part of Boeing) had plants at the Long Beach Airport where they built aircraft for World War II, and later built DC-8s, DC-9s, DC-10s, and MD-11s. Boeing built the Boeing 717 until 2006 and the C-17 Globemaster III strategic airlifter until 2015, the plants were leased by Mercedes-Benz and Relativity Space. Even after greatly reducing the number of local employees in recent years, Boeing is still the largest private employer in the city. Polar Air Cargo, an international cargo airline, was formerly based in Long Beach. TABC, Inc., a part of Toyota, makes a variety of car parts, including steering columns and catalytic converters, in Long Beach.

Epson America, Inc. the U.S. affiliate of Japan-based Seiko Epson Corporation, is headquartered in Long Beach. Pioneer Electronics, the U.S. affiliate of Japan-based Pioneer Corporation, is also headquartered in Long Beach along with SCAN Health Plan, a non-profit "Medicare Advantage" HMO for seniors. Molina Healthcare, Inc., a Medicaid management healthcare program, is headquartered in Long Beach. Jesse James' West Coast Choppers custom motorcycle shop was in Long Beach, and much of the Monster Garage cable TV show was shot in Long Beach. Long Beach Green Business Association is an organization working to create economic growth through the promotion of green business and promoting a buy local program for Long Beach. The North American subsidiary of video game developer and publisher Spike Chunsoft is headquartered in a building adjacent to the Long Beach Airport.

The Long Beach Accelerator was founded in 2019 as a public-private partnership between the city of Long Beach, Sunstone Management, and California State University, Long Beach, with the aim of growing the presence of diverse technology entrepreneurs in the city.

=== Top employers ===
Largest employers
#	Employer	Employees (2022)	Industry	HQ
1	Long Beach Unified School District	12,049	Education	Yes
2	City of Long Beach	5,395	Government	Yes
3	Long Beach Memorial Medical Center	4,950	Healthcare	Yes
4	VA Long Beach Healthcare System	3,524	Healthcare	Yes
5	California State University, Long Beach	3,336	Education	Yes
6	Long Beach City College	3,321	Education	Yes
7	Boeing	2,019	Aerospace	No
8	St. Mary Medical Center	1,547	Healthcare	Yes
9	CSULB Research Foundation	1,261	R&D	Yes
10	Molina Healthcare	1,119	Healthcare	Yes

Trade valued annually at more than $140 billion moves through Long Beach, making it the second busiest seaport in the United States. The Port supports more than 30,000 jobs in Long Beach, 316,000 jobs throughout Southern California and 1.4 million jobs throughout the United States. It generates about $16 billion in annual trade-related wages statewide.

=== Retail ===
Los Altos Center is the only mall anchored by major department stores within city limits, while Lakewood Center mall is adjacent to Long Beach. Until the 1950s, Long Beach was the major retail hub between Los Angeles and Santa Ana. Buffum's, Walker's and Robert's all had their flagship stores in the city. Later the Long Beach Plaza and Marina Pacifica malls were built, since repurposed as retail power centers. The largest shopping center within the city is the Long Beach Towne Center, a power center opened in 1999 on the site of the Long Beach Naval Hospital. The Pike Outlets and 2nd & PCH are new retail centers.

== Arts and culture ==
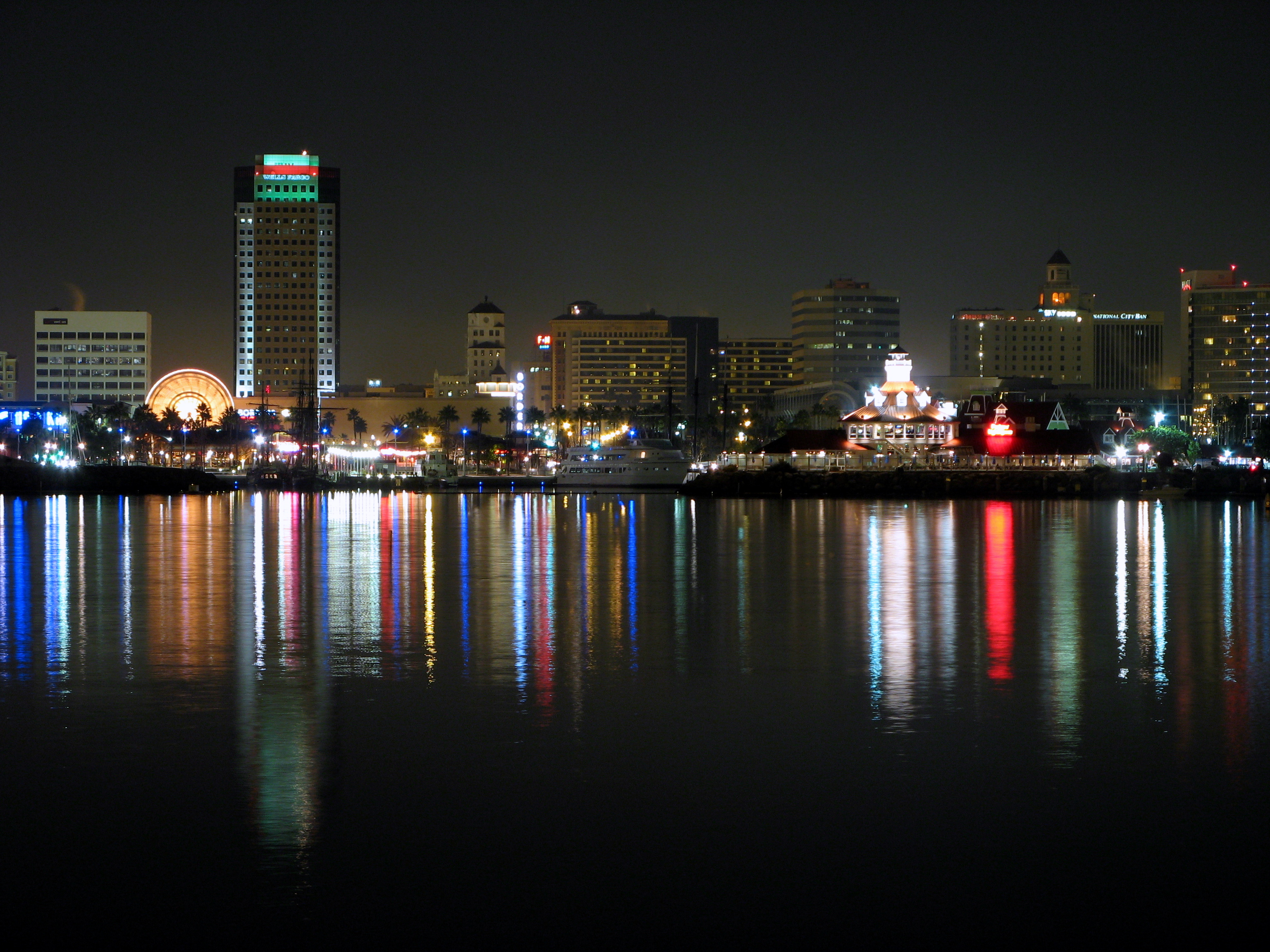
View of downtown from the Queen Mary at night

=== Art ===
The Long Beach Museum of Art, sited in the historic Elizabeth Milbank Anderson residence, is owned by the City of Long Beach, and operated by the Long Beach Museum of Art Foundation. Long Beach also features the Museum of Latin American Art (MOLAA), founded in 1996 by Dr. Robert Gumbiner. It is the only museum in the western United States that exclusively features modern and contemporary Latin American art.

Long Beach's newest museum is The Pacific Island Ethnic Art Museum (PieAM). This museum was a project of Robert Gumbiner at the time of his death. The museum opened October 15, 2010.

In 1965, Long Beach State hosted the first International Sculpture Symposium to be held in the United States and the first at a college or university. Six sculptors from around the world and two from the United States created many of the monumental sculptures seen on the campus. There are now over 20 sculptures on the campus.

Long Beach is known for its street art. Some of the murals were created in conjunction with the city's Mural and Cultural Arts Program, but many others were not.

On the exterior of the Long Beach Sports Arena is one of the artist Wyland's Whaling Walls. At 116,000 square feet (10,800 square metres), it is the world's largest mural (according to the Guinness Book of Records).

Adjacent to the Museums of Latin American Art (MOLAA) and the Pacific Island Ethnic Art Museum (PieAM), in Gumbiner Park, stands the Long Beach High Five, created by sculptor Jorge Mujica. This interactive aluminium sculpture is intended to engage the public.

Shops and galleries in the East Village Arts District, in downtown Long Beach hold their monthly art openings and artists exhibit in street galleries on the second Saturday of the month during the Artwalk.

Long Beach has a percent for art program administered through the Arts Council of Long Beach and the Redevelopment Agency which ensures new private developments contribute to the arts fund or commission artworks for their new projects.

=== Music ===
The Bob Cole Conservatory of Music, the recently renamed school of music at CSULB, presents a wide variety of classical, jazz, and world music concerts each year. The Conservatory is part of CSULB's renowned College of the Arts.

The Long Beach Symphony plays numerous classical and pop music concerts throughout the year. The symphony plays at the Terrace Theater in the Long Beach Convention and Entertainment Center.

Long Beach Opera, founded in 1979, is the oldest professional opera company serving the Los Angeles and Orange County regions. It presents performances of standard and non-standard opera repertoire at various locations, including the Terrace Theater and Center Theater of the Long Beach Convention and Entertainment Center and the Richard and Karen Carpenter Performing Arts Center at CSULB.

Long Beach Community Concert Association is a volunteer organization that provides musical entertainment appealing to seniors and others, four Sunday afternoons a year at the Carpenter Performing Arts Center at CSULB. LBCCA also has an outreach program taking musical entertainment to senior care and senior housing facilities around the greater Long Beach area.

KJAZZ 88.1 FM (KKJZ) broadcasts from California State University, Long Beach. The station originally featured jazz and blues music exclusively but now plays a broader range of music including Rhythm and Blues (R&b). KKJZ can also be listened to over the Internet. Kbeach is the student owned and operated web-only radio at CSULB.

Long Beach City College operates two internet student-run radio stations, KCTY FM and KLBC AM.

Long Beach is the host to a number of long-running music festivals. They include the Bob Marley Reggae Festival (February), the Cajun & Zydeco Festival (May), the El Dia De San Juan Puerto Rican Festival (Salsa music, June) the Aloha Concert Jam (Hawaiian music, June), the Long Beach Jazz Festival (August), the Long Beach Blues Festival (September, since 1980), and the Brazilian Street Carnaval (Brazilian music, September).

The Long Beach Municipal Band, founded in 1909, is the longest running, municipally supported band in the country. In 2005, the band played 24 concerts in various parks around Long Beach.

Huntington Beach-based Heavy Metal band Avenged Sevenfold performed their 'Live in the LBC' show on April 10, 2008, closing out the Taste of Chaos tour for the year. This show was recorded and has become one of the 2000s' most iconic live metal albums.

Long Beach is also the point of origin for bands and musicians such as Daz Dillinger, the Pussycat Dolls, the Nitty Gritty Dirt Band, Jenni Rivera, T.S.O.L., Frank Ocean, Sublime, Snoop Dogg, Tha Mexakinz, Nate Dogg, Warren G, Tha Dogg Pound, Knoc-Turn'al, the Long Beach Dub Allstars, Avi Buffalo, Crystal Antlers, the Emperors, the Pyramids, Crooked I, Stick to Your Guns, War and Vince Staples.

=== Theater ===
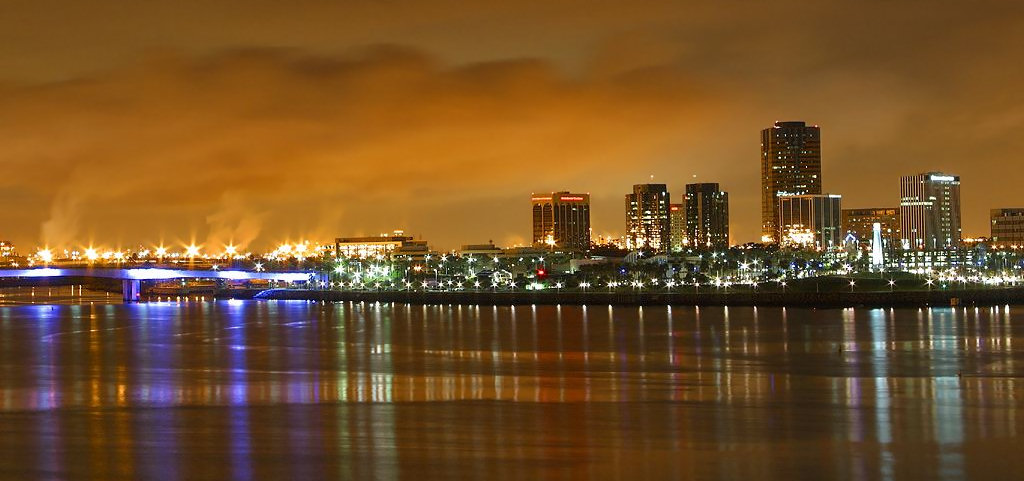
Downtown Long Beach at dusk

Long Beach has several resident professional and semi-professional theater companies. Musical Theatre West, one of the largest regional theatrical producers in Southern California, performs at the Carpenter Performing Arts Center on the campus of CSU Long Beach. International City Theatre produces plays and musicals at the Beverly O'Neill Theatre (part of the Long Beach Convention and Entertainment Center). The Long Beach Playhouse, in continuous operation for over 75 years, has shows running 50 weeks out of the year on two stages. Long Beach Shakespeare Company for over 20 years has provided free outdoor Shakespeare Festivals in the Summer.

Additionally, Long Beach is home to a number of smaller and "black-box" theaters, including the Alive Theatre, the Garage Theatre and California Repertory Company (part of the graduate theater program at CSULB) that performs at the Royal Theater aboard the Queen Mary in downtown Long Beach. Numerous tours and other stage events come through Long Beach, particularly at the Terrace Theater and the Carpenter Center, and both CSU Long Beach and Long Beach City College maintain active theater departments.

The Art Theatre on the 4th Street Corridor is one of few remaining historic movie theaters of its era in Southern California.

=== Cultural events ===
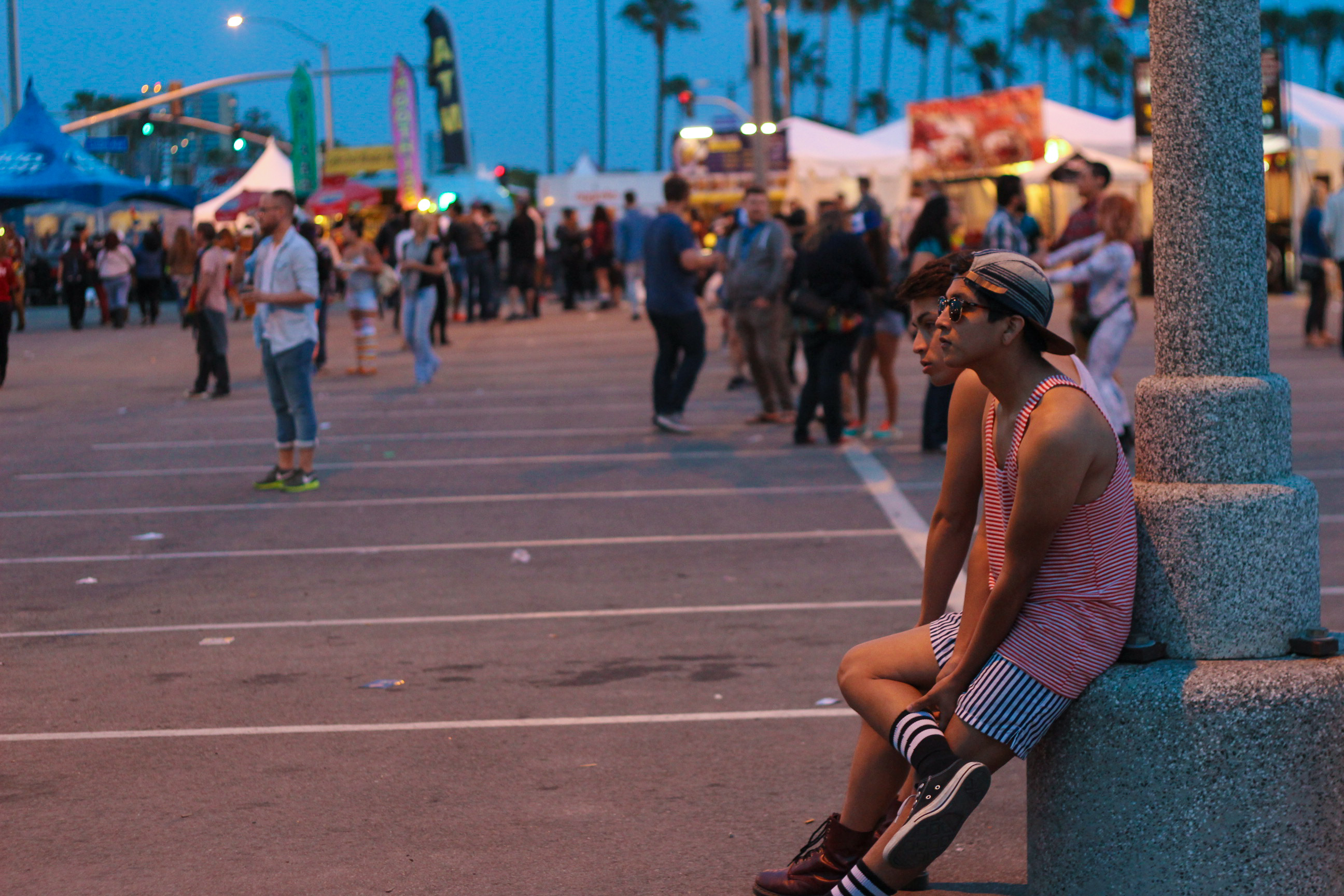
Two young men at the Long Beach Lesbian and Gay Pride Parade and Festival in 2015.

In October, Long Beach State hosts the CSULB Wide Screen Film Festival, at the Carpenter Performing Arts Center. The festival started in 1992 as a showcase for movies shot in the widescreen format, but has since been transformed into an artist-in-residence event. A major video and film artist (such as former CSULB student Steven Spielberg) screens and discusses their own work as well as the ten productions that most influenced their cinematic vision.

The "Naples Island Christmas Parade" has been held since 1946, and passes through the canals of Naples and around Alamitos Bay past Belmont Shore. The "Parade of A Thousand Lights" is in the Shoreline Village area (near downtown Long Beach and the RMS Queen Mary). There is also a Christmas boat parade in the nearby Port of Los Angeles/San Pedro area, and another in the Huntington Harbour community of nearby Huntington Beach.

The Long Beach Lesbian and Gay Pride Parade and Festival has been held in May or June since 1984. It is the second largest event in Long Beach, attracting over 125,000 participants over the two-day celebration. It is the third largest Gay Pride Parade in the United States.

The Long Beach Sea Festival is held during the summer months (June through August). It features events centered on the ocean and the beach. These events include beach volleyball, movies on the beach, and a tiki festival.

=== Sites of interest ===
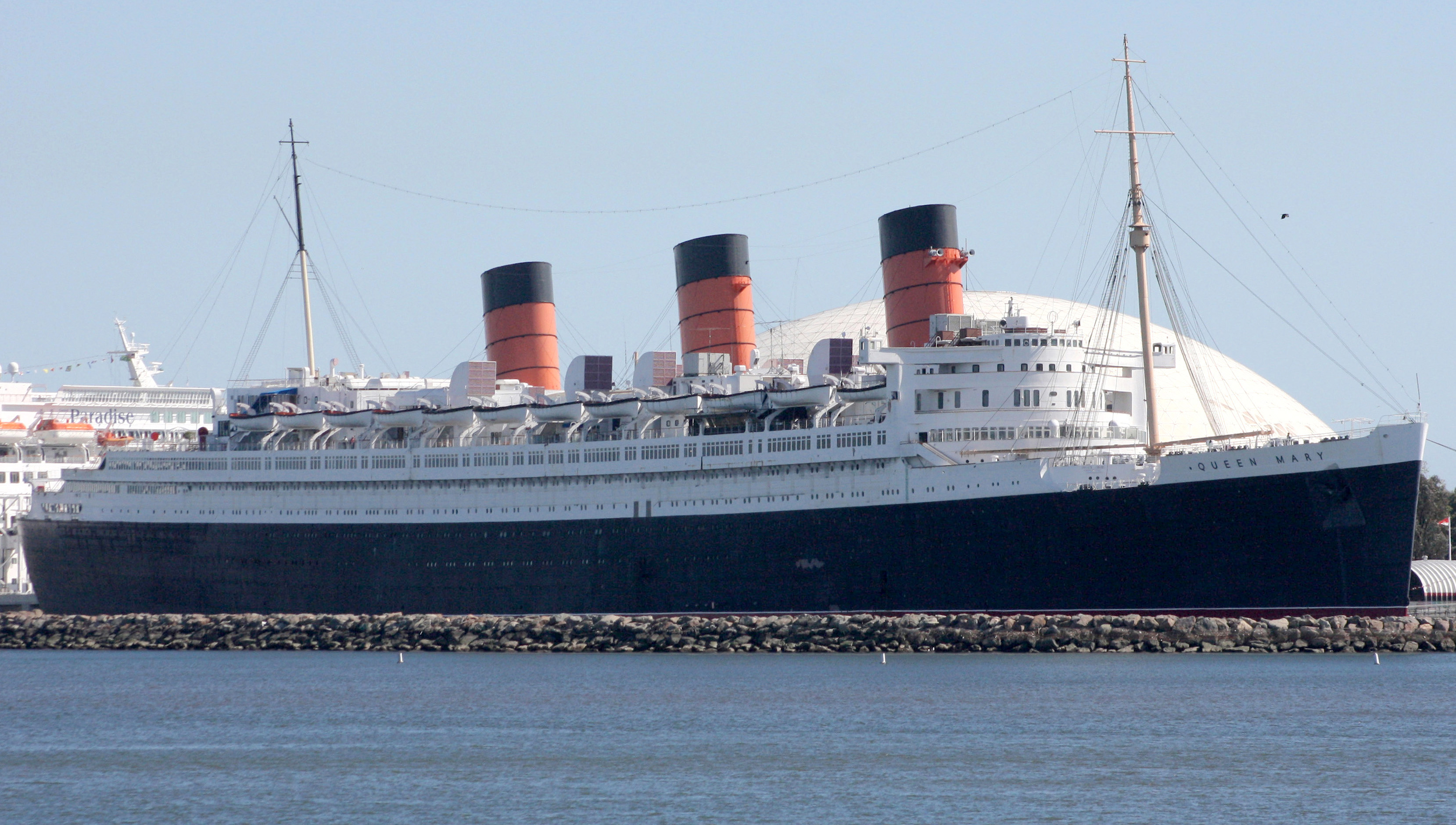
RMS Queen Mary in Long Beach Harbor

The RMS Queen Mary is a 1936 Art Deco ocean liner permanently docked at Long Beach. It was purchased by the city in 1967 for conversion to a hotel and maritime museum.

The nonprofit Aquarium of the Pacific is on a 5-acre (20,000 m^{2}) site on Rainbow Harbor in Long Beach, across the water from the Long Beach Convention Center, Shoreline Village, and the Queen Mary Hotel and Attraction.

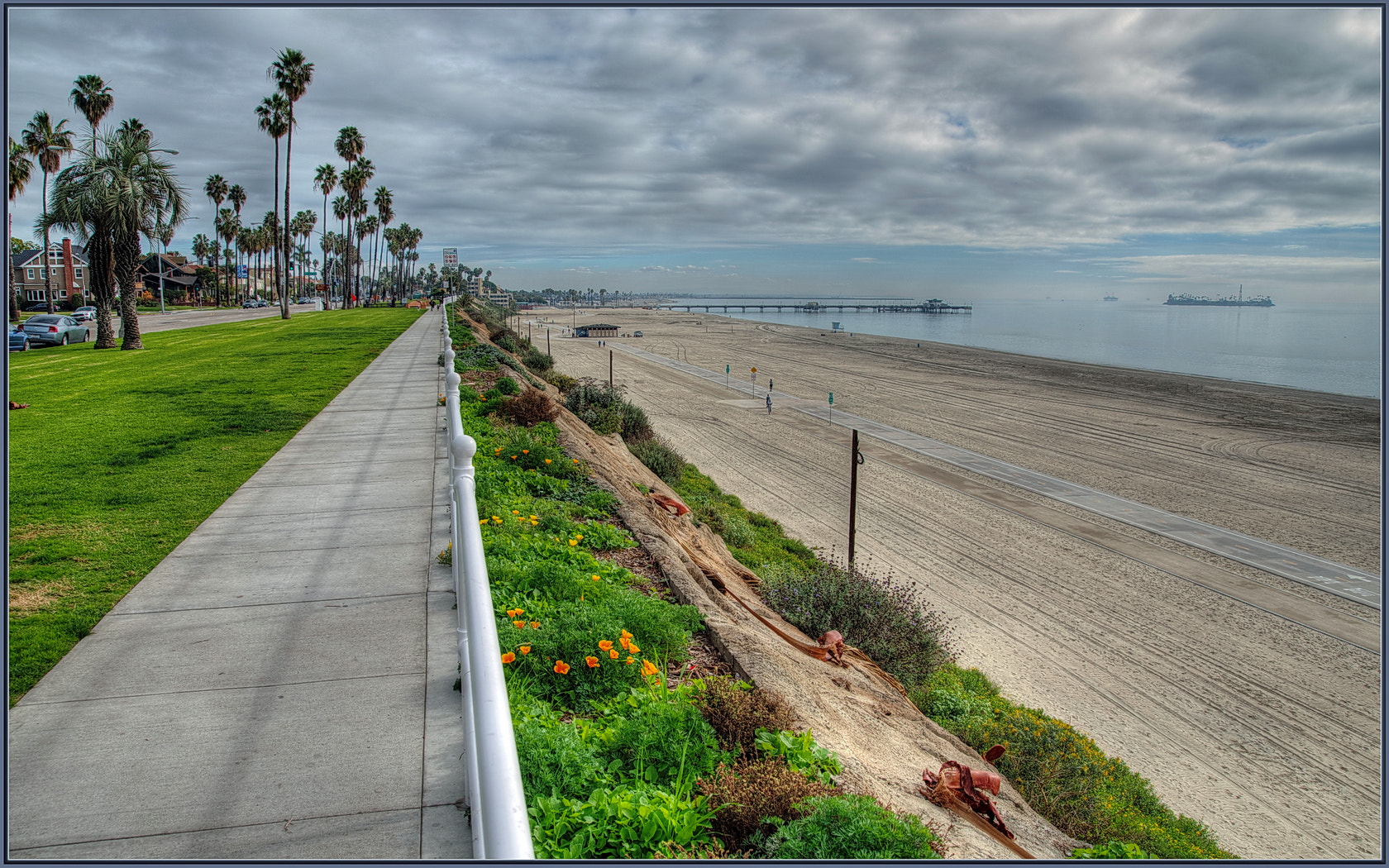
Bluff Park, and the Shoreline Pedestrian Bikepath and Belmont Veterans Memorial Pier

Lions Lighthouse is a decorative lighthouse built by the Lions Club to advertise their services for the blind. It is popular for scenic viewing.

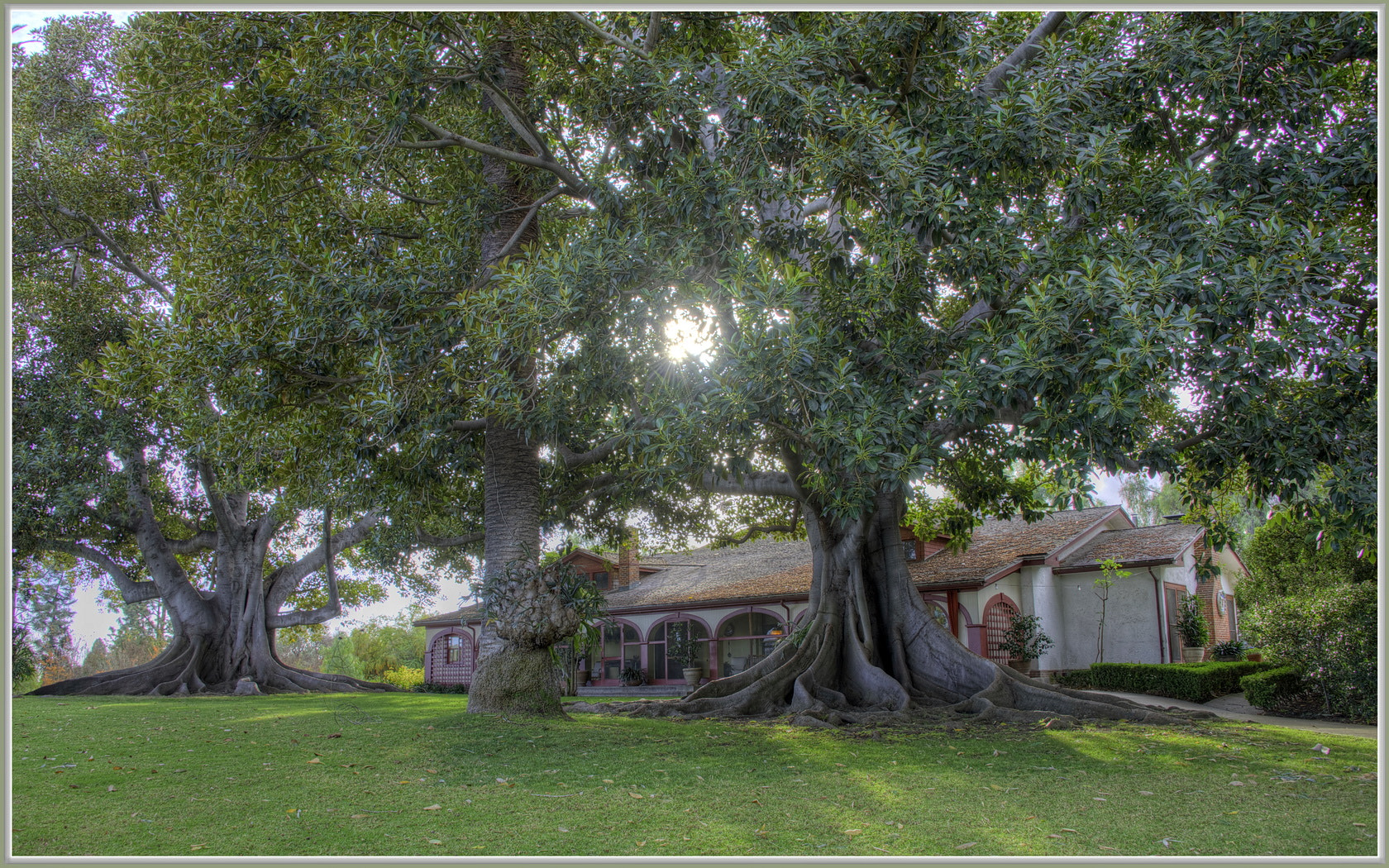
Rancho Los Alamitos

Rancho Los Alamitos is a 7.5-acre (30,000 m^{2}) historical site owned by the City of Long Beach and is near the Long Beach campus of the California State University system. The site includes five agricultural buildings, including a working blacksmith's shop, 4 acres (16,000 m^{2}) of gardens, and an adobe ranch house dating from around 1800. The Rancho is within a gated community; visitors must pass through security gates to get to it.

Rancho Los Cerritos is a 4.7-acre (19,000 m^{2}) historical site owned by Long Beach in the Bixby Knolls area near the Virginia Country Club. The adobe buildings date from the 1880s. The site also includes a California history research library.

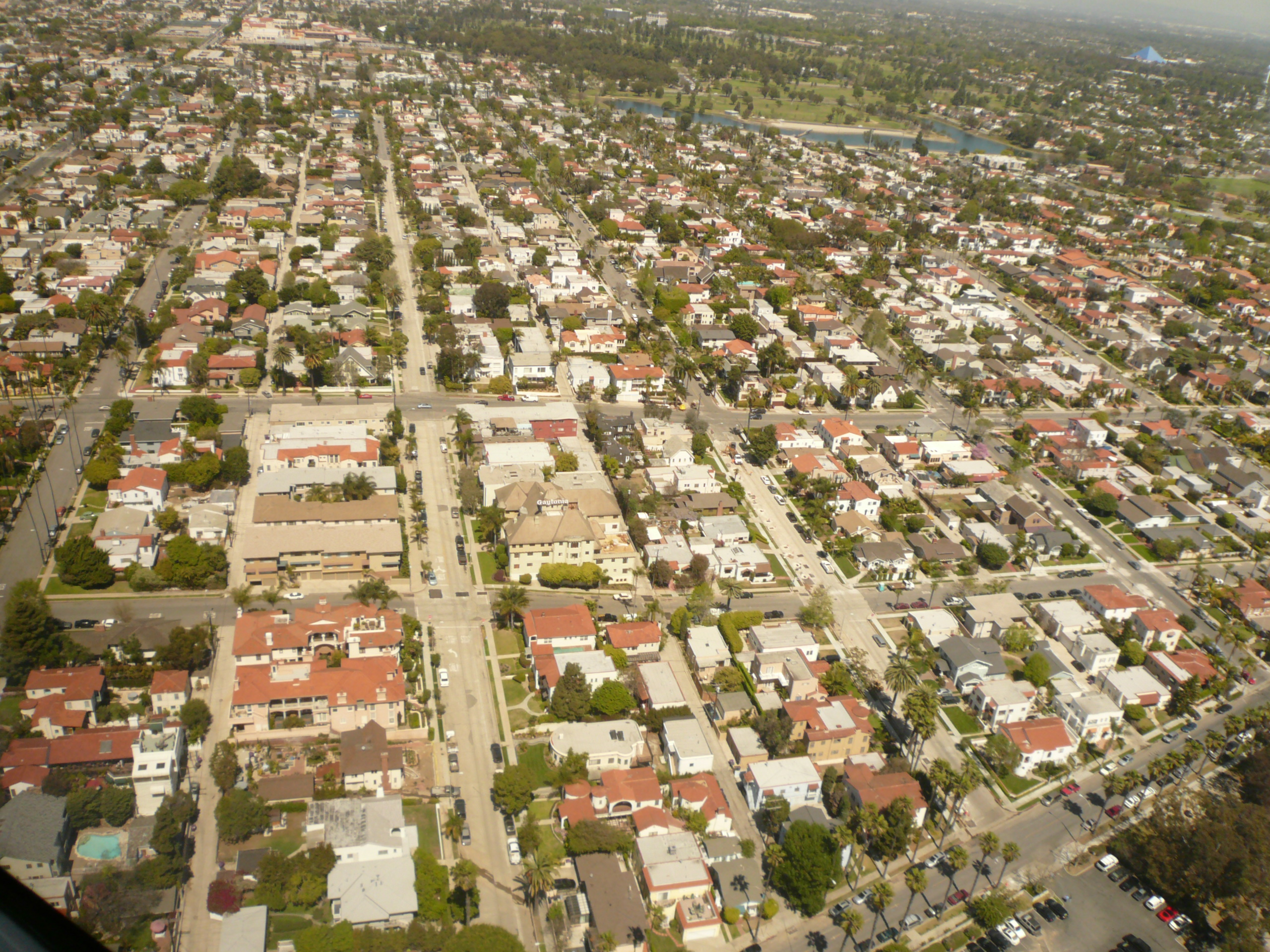
The Belmont Heights neighborhood

Bembridge House, a Queen Anne Victorian house, is open for tours. Long Beach is also home to the Skinny House.

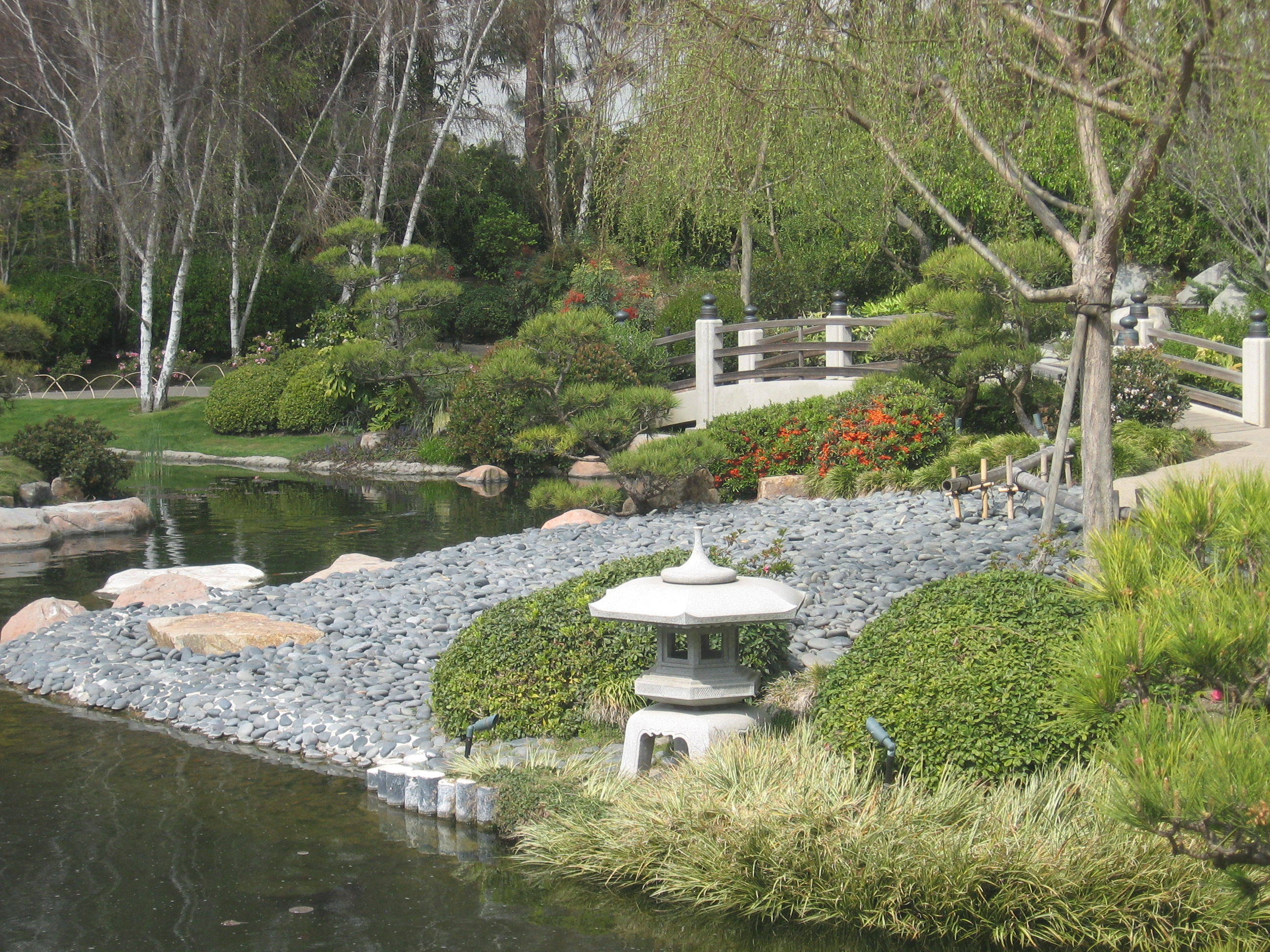
Earl Burns Miller Japanese Garden

The Earl Burns Miller Japanese Garden is on the campus of California State University, Long Beach.

Long Beach offers singing gondolier trips through the canals of Naples.

== Parks and recreation ==
Long Beach led Southern California in parks access, size and spending, ranking 16th among a survey of 75 large U.S. cities, with Los Angeles and Anaheim tied for 51st and Santa Ana 69th, according to a study released by a national conservation group. The Long Beach Department of Parks, Recreation and Marine received a Gold Medal award from the National Recreation and Park Association in 2002, 2003, and 2004, recognizing the Department's "outstanding management practices and programs". The department manages 92 parks covering over 3,100 acres (13 km^{2}) throughout the city. The department also operates four public swimming pools, and four launch ramps for boaters to access the Pacific Ocean.

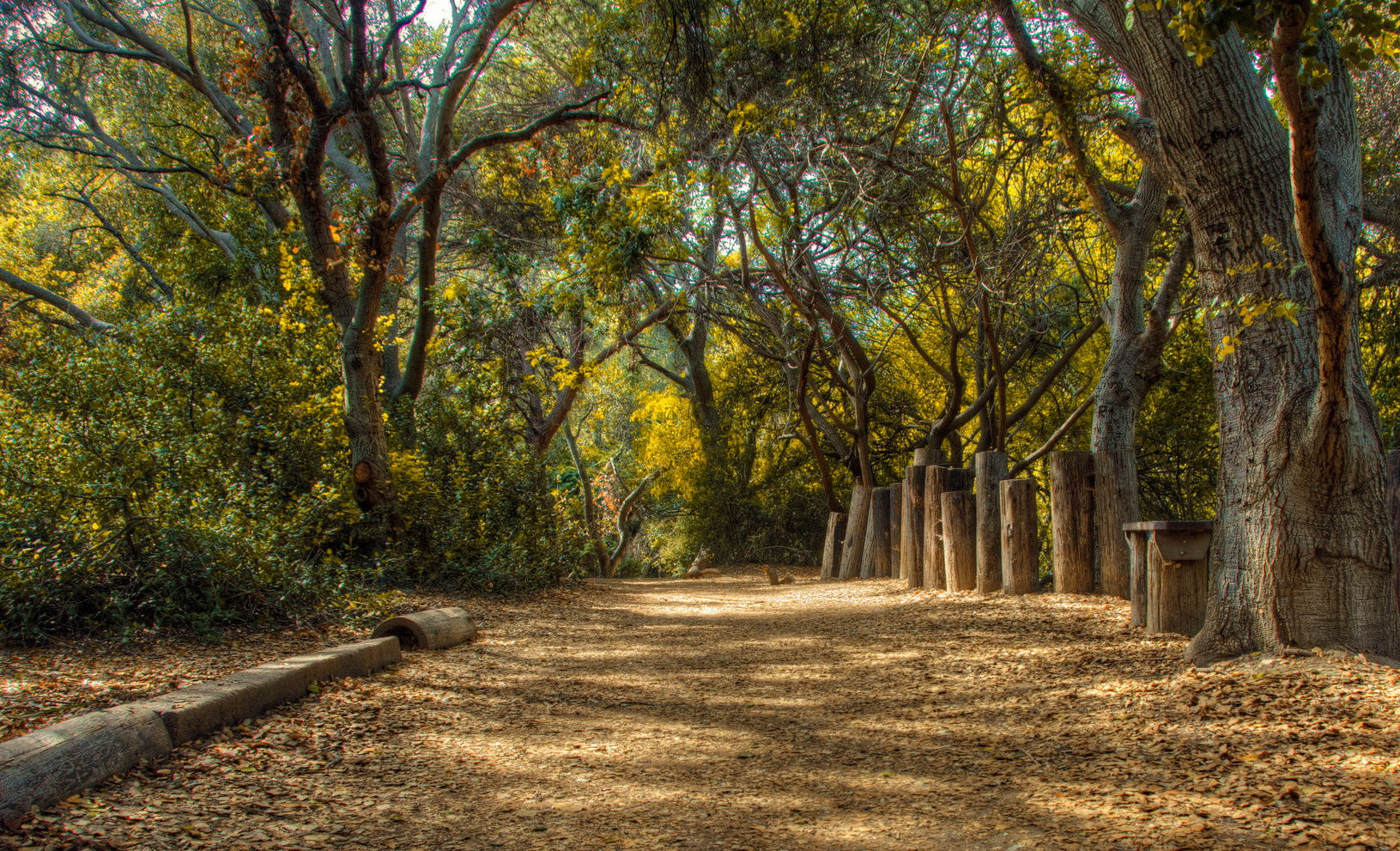
Walking trail in the El Dorado Nature Center

The 815 acres (3.30 km^{2}) El Dorado Regional Park, which features fishing lakes, an archery range, youth campground, bike trails, and picnic areas. The 102.5-acre (0.4 km^{2}) El Dorado Nature Center is part of the El Dorado Regional Park. The center features lakes, a stream, and trails, with meadows and forested areas. After an original hands-off approach, the center has begun to actively introduce indigenous species.

Willow Springs Park was founded as a part of the Willow Springs Wetlands Restoration Project which opened in October 2017. The project restored 11 acres of a 48-acre degraded oil well site into wetlands. These highlight the pivotal role the ecosystem played in the City of Long Beach's establishment in the late 1800s and helps preserve the site's history and unique topography. It is now at about 16 acres restored and, in August 2024, it began the process of being dedicated as an open space by the city council, which will make it the largest green space in Central Long Beach once done. It is run in collaboration with the city's office of Climate Action and Sustainability which was established in 2008 to support and advance environmental stewardship and equity in the City of Long Beach.

The Long Beach Green Belt path is a section of the old Pacific Electric right-of-way, restored by community activists as native habitat. The right-of-way was cleared of nonnatives, planted with indigenous plants, and made accessible with foot and bike paths. It supports approximately 40 species of California native plants as well as urban wildlife. The city and its residents have initiatives underway to revegetate the Long Beach stretch of the Los Angeles River with indigenous plants.

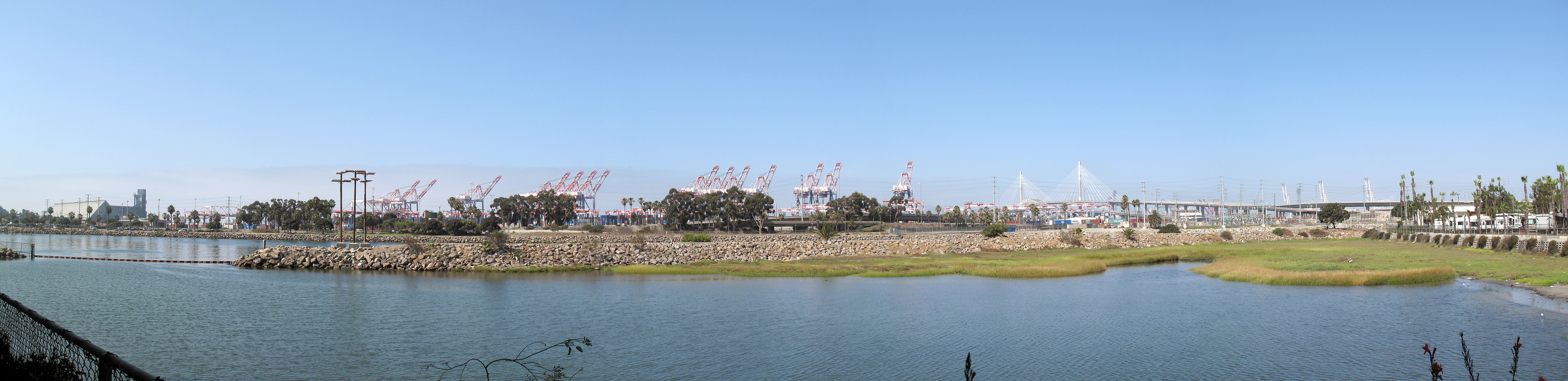
Golden Shore Marine Biological Reserve

The Los Cerritos Wetlands Study Group, state government agencies, and grassroots groups are collaborating on a plan to preserve Long Beach's last remaining wetlands. Long Beach is the first city in California to join the 'EcoZone' Program, intended to measurably improve environmental conditions through public-private partnerships. Other places in Long Beach to see natural areas include Bluff Park (coastal bluffs), Colorado Lagoon, the Golden Shore Marine Biological Reserve, the Jack Dunster Marine Reserve, Shoreline Park, and DeForest Park.

The Municipal Fly Casting Pool at Recreation Park in East Long Beach is a 260-by-135-foot clear water, fishless pond built and operated since 1925 by the Long Beach Casting Club as only one of two Southern California city operated casting ponds (the other being in Pasadena). Described recently as a serene pond "surrounded by a seemingly endless stretch of green grass against a backdrop of mountains and palm trees", several movie stars from the 1940s were taught to fly cast at the pond, including Robert Taylor, Clark Gable, Jimmy Durante, and Barbara Stanwyck. In 1932, the fly fishing clubhouse adjacent to the fly fishing pond was used for the Summer Olympic Games and housed military personnel during World War II.

Rosie's Dog Beach in Belmont Shore is the only legal off-leash beach area for dogs in Los Angeles County. This 3-acre (12,000 m^{2}) area is situated between Roycroft and Argonne Avenues.

== Sports ==
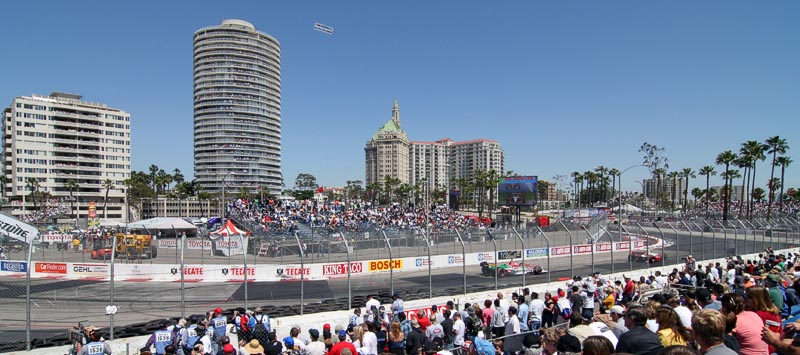
2005 Grand Prix of Long Beach, showing turn 10 and the Long Beach skyline

=== Grand Prix of Long Beach ===
The Grand Prix of Long Beach in April is the single largest event in Long Beach. It started in 1975 as a Formula 5000 race on the streets of downtown, and became a Formula One race, the United States Grand Prix West, the following year. From 1984 to 2008 it was a Champ Car event, and is now an IndyCar race. During the same weekend as the Grand Prix, there is also an IMSA SportsCar Championship race, a Formula D round and the Pirelli World Challenge.

The Long Beach Motorsports Walk of Fame is on South Pine Avenue in front of the Long Beach Convention Center adjacent to the Long Beach Grand Prix circuit. The Walk of Fame was created in 2006 to honor key contributors to motorsports and annually inducts new members in conjunction with the Long Beach Grand Prix. A 22-inch (560 mm) bronze medallion is placed in the sidewalk for each new inductee. The medallion includes a rendition of the racer's car and lists top achievements in motor sports.

=== Long Beach Marathon ===
The Long Beach Marathon is run every year in October throughout the City of Long Beach. The annual event includes a variety of races including a Kids Fun Run, a Bike Tour, 5K, Half Marathon and Full Marathon. All races begin and end around the Shoreline Village area of downtown Long Beach. 25,000 runners and cyclists participated in the 2013 festivities drawing nearly 50,000 people attending the event overall. The full marathon is a fast Boston qualifying course passing through sandy beaches, Belmont Shore, and the Cal State Long Beach campus.

=== Baseball ===
The Long Beach State Dirtbags baseball team has been playing since 1954. They play at Blair Field, across the street from Wilson High School. They are called the Dirtbags by many fans and is the team's official nickname.

=== Basketball ===
Long Beach was the home of the American Basketball League team Long Beach Chiefs during the 1962/1963 season. They played in the newly opened Long Beach Arena.

The minor league American Basketball Association team, the Long Beach Jam, played in the Walter Pyramid (a pyramid-shaped gym) on the Long Beach State campus) from 2003 to 2005.

The Southern California Summer Pro League is a showcase for current and prospective NBA basketball players, including recent draft picks, NBA players working on their skills and conditioning, and international professionals hoping to become NBA players. The league plays in the Pyramid-on the Long Beach State campus during July.

The Long Beach Blue Waves of The Basketball League (TBL) have played at Santiago High School since 2022.

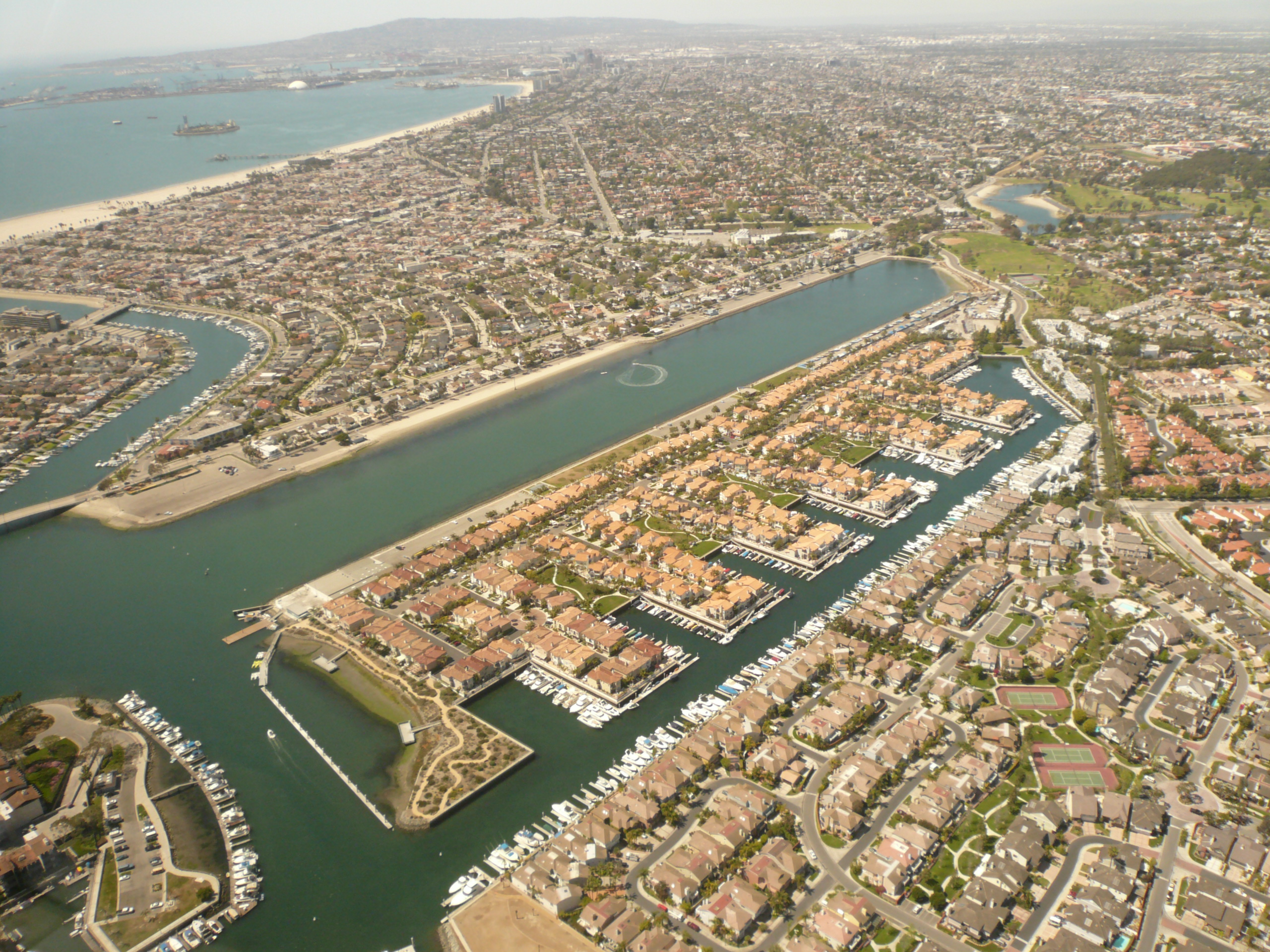
Long Beach Marine Stadium, created to host the rowing events for the 1932 Summer Olympics

=== Sailing ===
Since its inception in August 1964, the Congressional Cup has grown into one of the major international sailing events. Now held in April, it is the only grade 1 match race regatta held in the United States. The one-on-one race format is the same as the America's Cup, and many of the winners of the Congressional Cup have gone on to win the America's Cup as well.

The Leeway Sailing and Aquatics Center on Alamitos Bay in Belmont Shore is a youth sailing program founded in 1929.

=== Water skiing ===
In July, there is the annual Catalina Ski Race, which starts from Long Beach Harbor and goes to Catalina Island and back to complete a 100-kilometer (62 mi) circuit. This race has been held annually since 1948 and features skiers from up to seventy teams from around the world.

=== Surfing ===
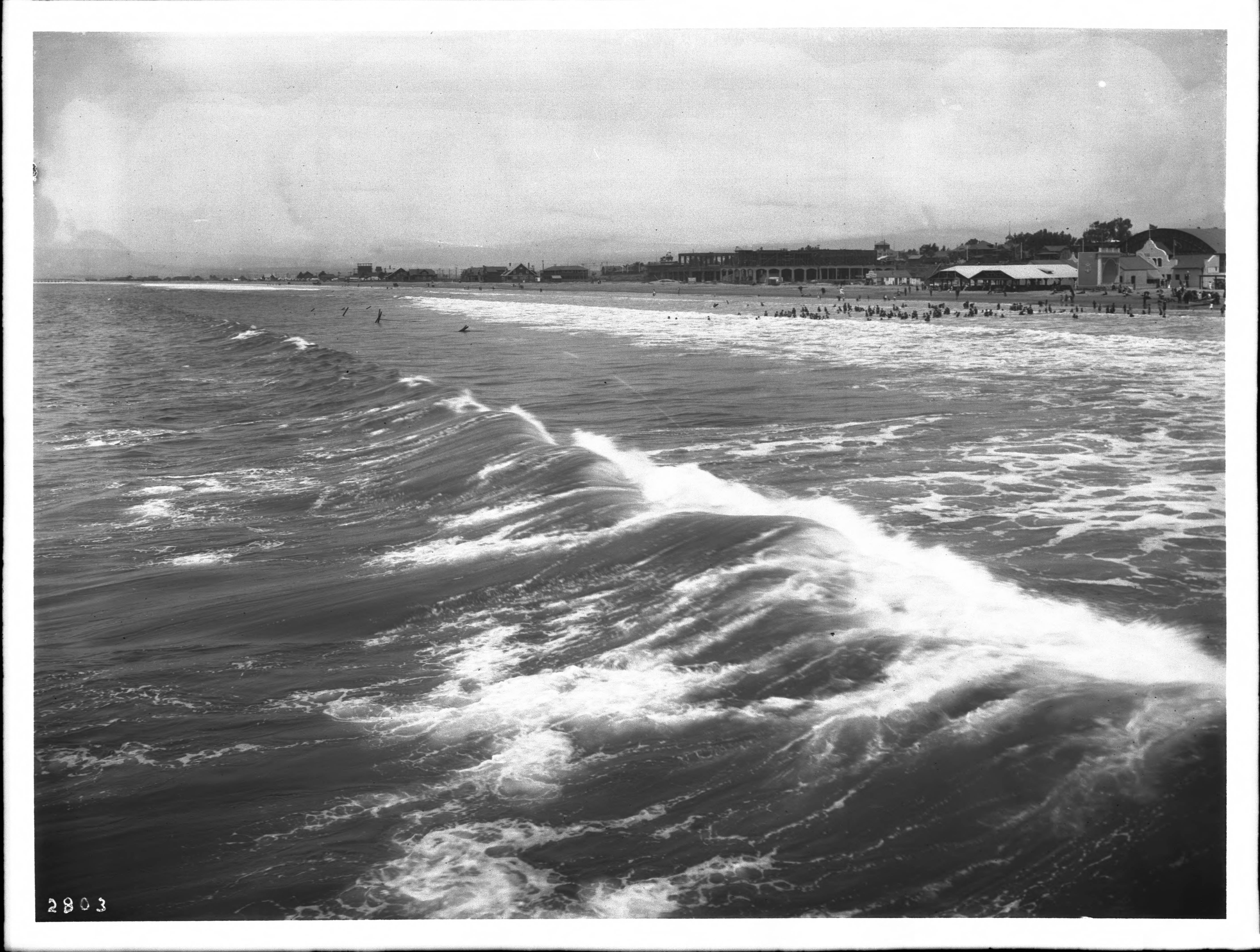
Waves at Long Beach and the Bixby Hotel under construction, c. 1906

Although California's surfing scene is said to have gotten its start in Long Beach when in 1911 two surfers returned from Hawaii and the city hosted the first National Surfing and Paddleboard Championships in 1938, surfing is now uncommon in Long Beach due to a 2.2-mile (3.5 km) long breakwater built in 1949 to protect the United States Pacific Fleet. The breakwater reduces "mighty waves to mere lake-like lapping along the city's beaches". The fleet left in the 1990s, and now some residents are calling for it to be lowered or eliminated and the city has commissioned a $100,000 study for this purpose. In November 2019, the study concluded that any changes to the breakwater would be far too costly and could have potential impacts on the port of Long Beach, the port of Los Angeles, the oil islands, U.S. Naval Operations, Shoreline Marina, and the Peninsula.

=== Rugby union ===
The Belmont Shore rugby team plays in the US Rugby Super League. They have been in seven league finals, and have been champions three times.

=== College sports ===
Long Beach State's team mascot are the Beach. The school has participated in national championships in women's volleyball (5), men's volleyball (1), track and field (1), men's tennis (1; Division II), swimming (1; Division II), women's badminton (2), and women's field hockey (1). The school also has regularly appeared in NCAA tournaments in men's baseball, men's softball, men's basketball, women's basketball, men's golf, women's tennis, men's water polo, and women's water polo. Their cheer team were national champions in 2003, 2004 and 2006. The D1 roller hockey team were the 2011 national champions after defeating Lindenwood University.

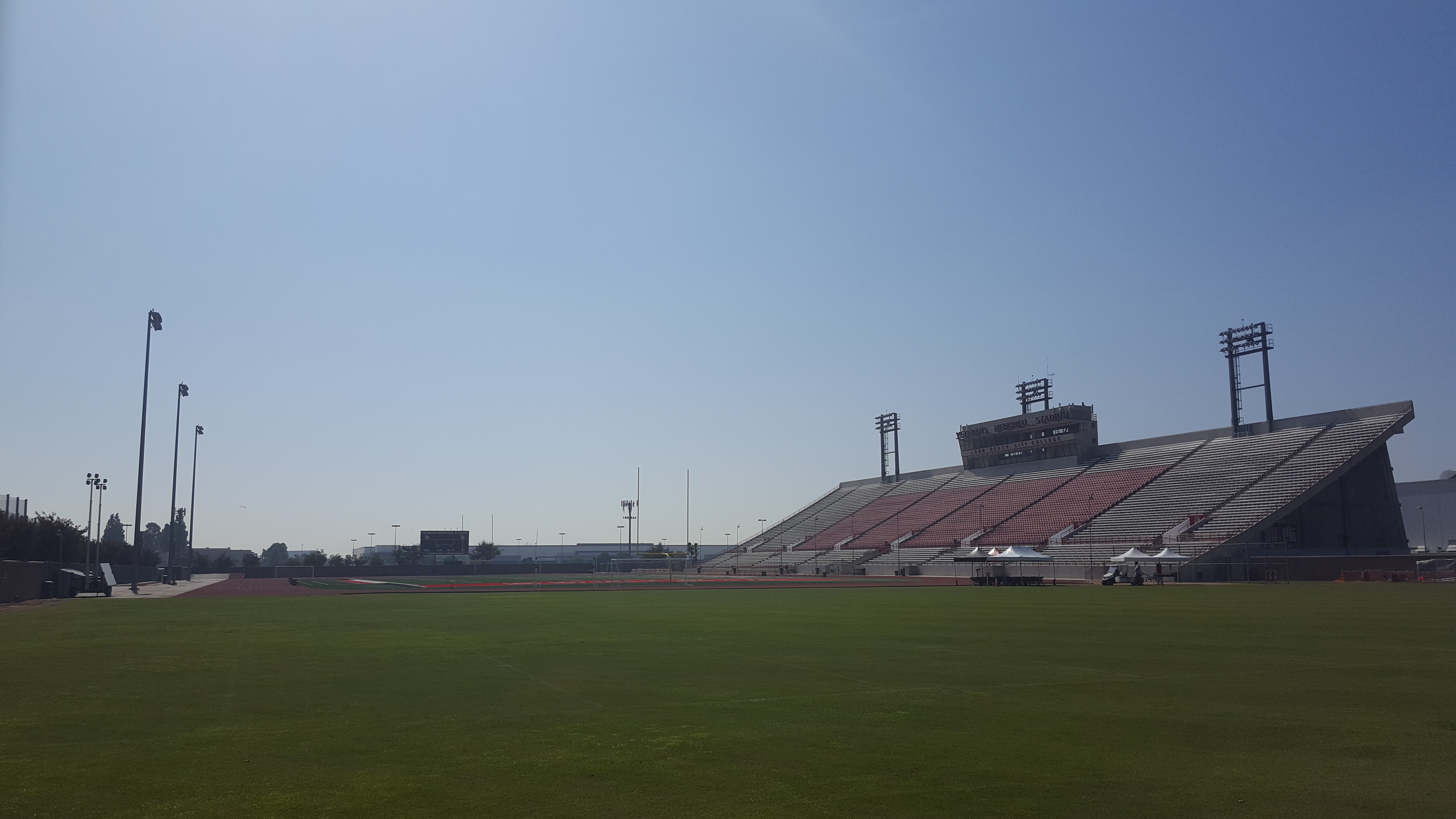
Veterans Memorial Stadium, home to the Long Beach City College football team

The other collegiate sports team in the city is that of Long Beach City College. The school has appeared in national championships in men's gymnastics (6), football (5), women's soccer (3), and men's doubles and singles tennis (1 each). They have also had state championships in numerous sports, including 2006–7 championships in men's and women's water polo.

==== Archery ====
The archery field in El Dorado Regional Park was the site for the 1984 Los Angeles Olympics archery competition.

CSU Long Beach has one of the few remaining university varsity archery teams in California.

=== 2028 Summer Olympics and Paralympics ===
Multiple sports will be held in Long Beach during the 2028 Summer Olympics, including water polo, open water swimming, sailing, rowing, canoeing, sports climbing, shooting, beach volleyball and handball. During the 2028 Summer Paralympics, Long Beach will host shooting, swimming, para climbing, sitting volleyball, blind football, rowing and paracanoe.

== Government ==
=== Municipal ===
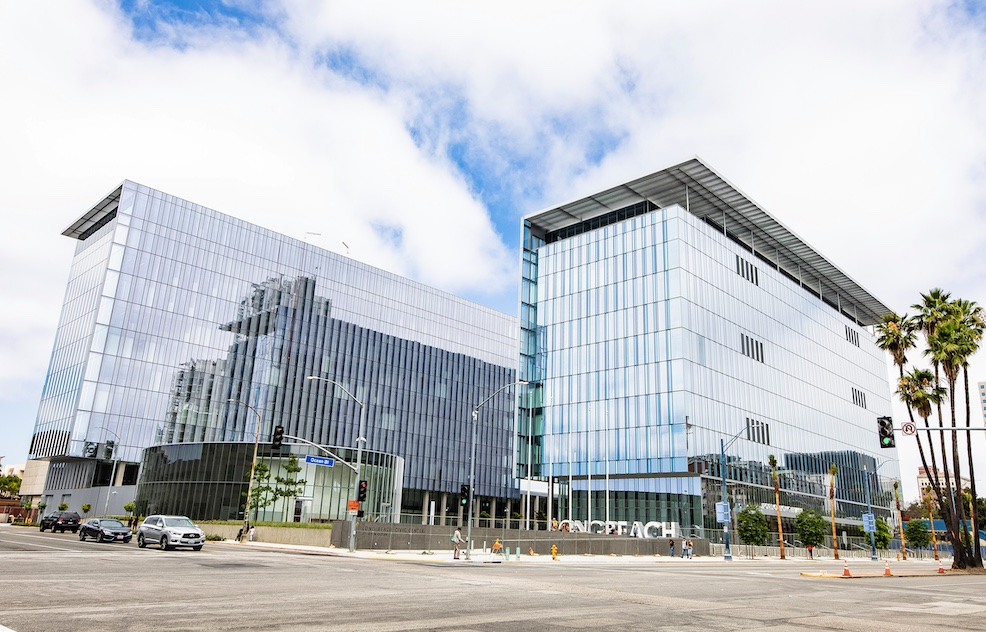
Long Beach Civic Center, designed by Skidmore, Owings & Merrill and completed in 2019

Long Beach is a California charter city using the mayor–council form of government. It is governed by nine City Council members, who are elected by district, and the Mayor, who is elected at-large since a citywide initiative passed in 1988. The City Attorney, City Auditor, and City Prosecutor are also elected positions. The city is supported by a budget of $2.3 billion, and has more than 5,500 employees. Long Beach was first incorporated in 1888 with 59 buildings and a new school. Nine years later, dissatisfaction with prohibition and high taxes led to an abortive and short-lived disincorporation. Before the year 1897 was out, the citizens voted to reincorporate, and the 1897 date of incorporation is shown on the city seal.

Long Beach is a full-service city that provides nearly all of its own municipal services, in contrast with a contract city. City hall provides a full range of traditional municipal services through the various departments that make up its staff of civil servants. In addition to its own police and fire departments, Long Beach provides:

- Municipal water supply and sewer service through the Long Beach Water Department, which has a water treatment plant within the city and an extensive reclaimed water system for parks and other landscaping
- A Gas & Oil Department, which manages consumer natural gas service and infrastructure, as well as crude oil extraction subsidence control
- Health services through the Long Beach Health & Human Services Department, which handles both environmental health (such as restaurant/food inspection) and public health services. This is one of the only four municipal health departments in California (the other three being Berkeley, Pasadena, and Vernon)
- Sanitation and recycling services through the Environmental Services Bureau in the Public Works Department
- Animal control service that, in addition to serving Long Beach, serves nearby cities including Signal Hill and Seal Beach
- A City Auditor
- A City Prosecutor

Long Beach held its elections for City Council on April (primary) and June (runoff) until the 2018 election. Starting with the 2020 election, primary election is being held in March and runoff election is being held in November.

The major exception to the full range of municipal services is electricity, which is provided by Southern California Edison.

==== Earthquake safety ====
Long Beach sits atop the Newport–Inglewood Fault. Severe damage occurred in the 1933 Long Beach earthquake.

A 1986 law authored by State Senator Al Alquist concerning unreinforced masonry buildings resulted in the demolition or retrofitting of many of these buildings in Long Beach.

The city's Seismic Resiliency Program encourages the retrofit of soft story buildings. This type of building is the highest priority for remediation. Statistics gathered by survey indicate there are 3,226 soft story buildings in Long Beach, containing 26,000 living units, and housing over 100,000 Long Beach residents.

Other buildings of concern include non-ductile concrete and steel moment frame buildings.

=== Federal and state representation ===
In the California State Senate, Long Beach is represented by Democrat Lena Gonzalez who represents the 33rd district. In the California State Assembly, it is split between the 65th district, represented by Democrat Mike Gipson, and the 69th district represented by Democrat Josh Lowenthal.

In the United States House of Representatives, Long Beach is split between California's 42nd congressional district (Rep. Robert Garcia) and 44th district (Rep. Nanette Barragán).

=== Politics ===
According to the California Secretary of State, as of October 19, 2020, Long Beach has 279,735 registered voters. Of those, 147,276 (52.65%) are registered Democrats, 47,615 (17.02%) are registered Republicans, and 66,857 (23.90%) have declined to state a political party/are independents.

== Infrastructure ==
=== Police department ===
The Long Beach Police Department provides law enforcement for the City of Long Beach.

==== Restrictions on registered sex offenders ====
On March 18, 2008, Long Beach became the first city in California to heavily restrict residency and visitation rights for California registered sex offenders. Triggered by a local protest of a multi-apartment dwelling which tenanted several paroled registered sex offenders, and fueled by local radio hosts John Kobylt and Ken Chiampou of KFI's John and Ken show, city council members voted 7–0 to enact 18 ordinances, of which the most restrictive prohibits residency by all registered sex offenders, whether they are on parole or not, within 2,000 feet (610 m) of any child care center, public or private school, or park. Google Maps measurements indicate the total exclusion area encompasses over 96% of the area of Long Beach that is zoned for residential use. Registered sex offenders residing within the exclusion zone were given until September 2008 to vacate the restricted area. Once this happens, no sex offender will legally be able to live in the vast majority of Long Beach. While several other ordinances restrict the number of registered sex offenders who may reside in an apartment complex, there are no apartment complexes within city limits that are outside of the exclusion zone. In addition, the ordinances prohibit all registered sex offenders from using any park, beach, or facility that caters to children, such as amusement parks and restaurants with children's playgrounds, or even travel within 500 feet (150 m) of such places.

=== Fire department ===
The Long Beach Fire Department (LBFD), ISO Class 1, provides fire protection and emergency medical services to the City of Long Beach. The Long Beach Fire Department operates out of 23 Fire Stations throughout the city.

In addition to serving 55 square miles (140 km^{2}) with over 500,000 residents, the department's Marine Safety Division patrols the waterways and beach front areas.

=== County ===
- The Los Angeles Superior Court, which covers all of Los Angeles County, operates the Governor George Deukmejian Courthouse in downtown Long Beach. It is one of the 50 courthouses in the county.
- The Los Angeles County Department of Health Services operates the Torrance Health Center in Harbor Gateway, Los Angeles, near Torrance and serving Long Beach.

=== State and federal ===
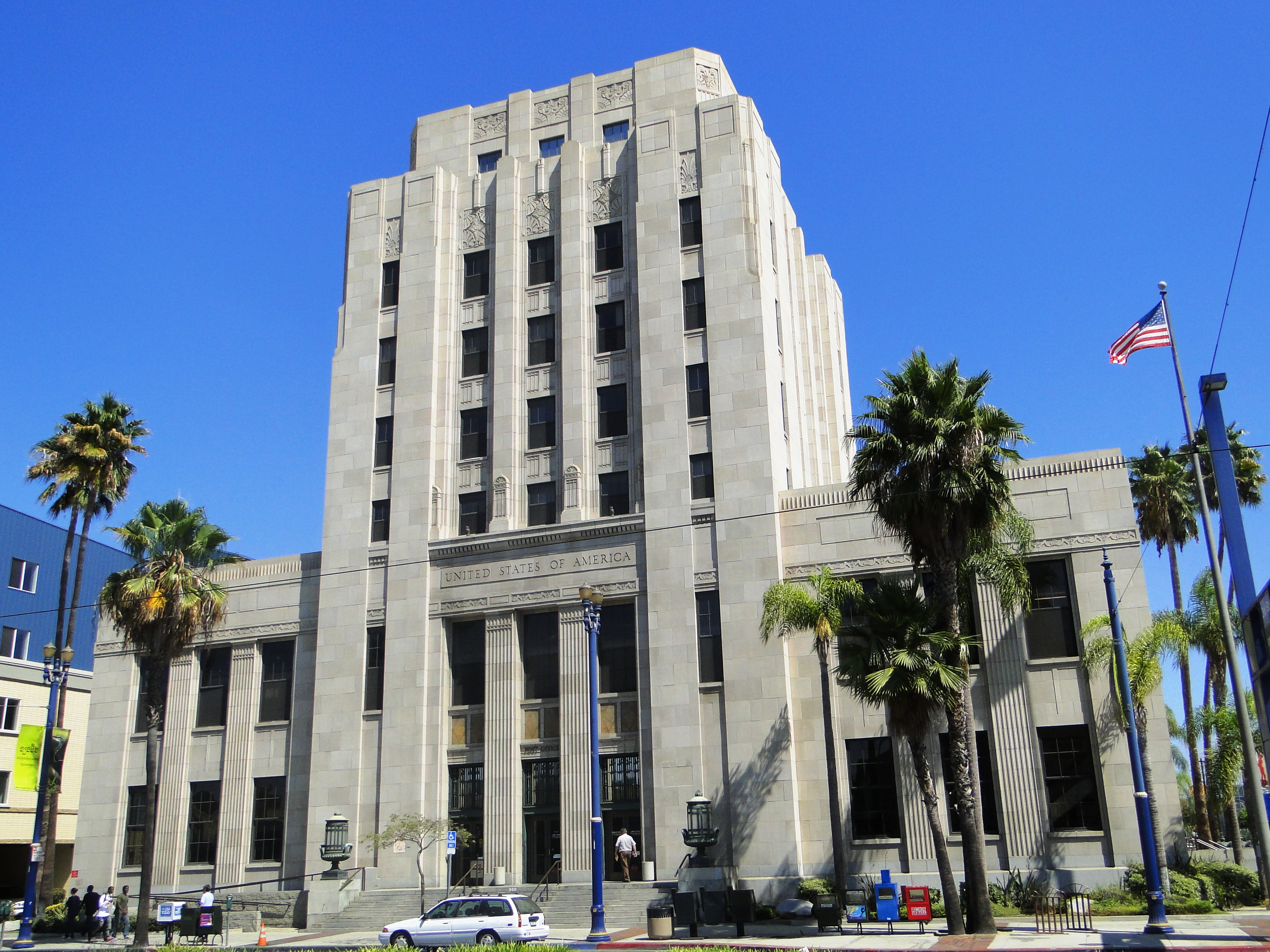
US Post Office-Long Beach Main

- The Glenn M. Anderson Long Beach Federal Building in downtown Long Beach at 501 West Ocean Blvd., houses offices for NOAA and other federal agencies, although NOAA plans to shift leadership of the Fisheries office to the Pacific Northwest and shrink this office through attrition.
- The Long Beach Main Post Office of the U.S. Postal Service serves as the main postal facility for Long Beach.
- The Long Beach Naval Shipyard was established in 1943 and closed in 1997, employing over 16,000 people at its peak in 1945.

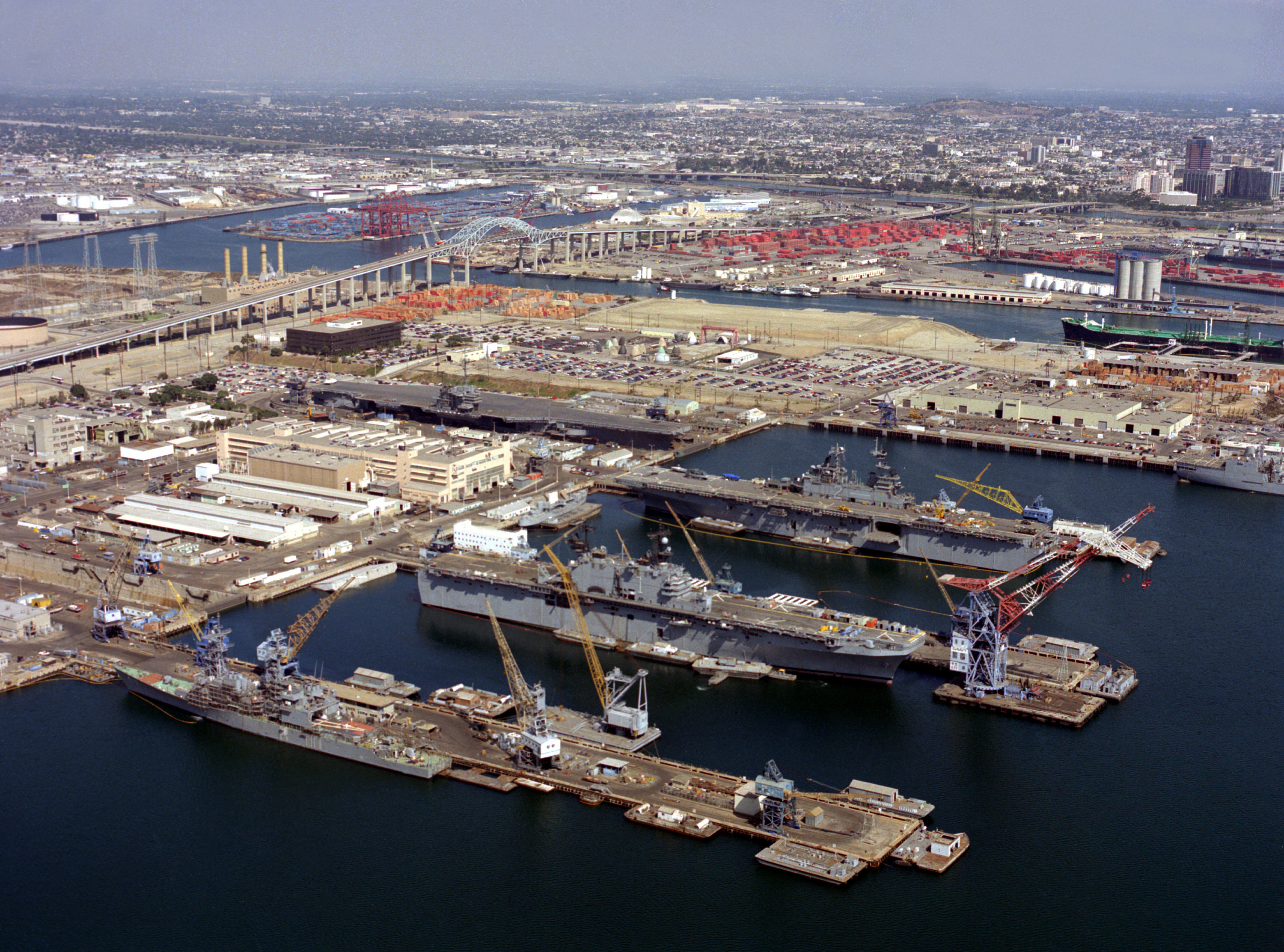
The Long Beach Naval Shipyard and the USS David R. Ray, Tarawa, and Essex in 1993. In the background is the original Gerald Desmond Bridge.

- VA Long Beach Healthcare System including the Tibor Rubin VA Medical Center and Cabrillo VA Clinic

== Education ==
=== Primary and secondary schools ===
==== Public schools ====
Long Beach Unified School District serves most of the City of Long Beach.

LBUSD high schools in the Long Beach city limits:

- Cabrillo High School
- Ernest McBride High School
- Jordan High School
- Long Beach Polytechnic High School
- Millikan High School
- Renaissance High School for the Arts
- Richard D. Browning High School
- Sato Academy of Mathematics and Science
- Will J. Reid High School
- Wilson High School

Other school districts that serve sections of Long Beach include:

- ABC Unified School District
- Paramount Unified School District
- Los Angeles Unified School District (LAUSD)
  - Rancho Dominguez Preparatory School, an LAUSD facility, is in the Long Beach city limits

=== Colleges and universities ===
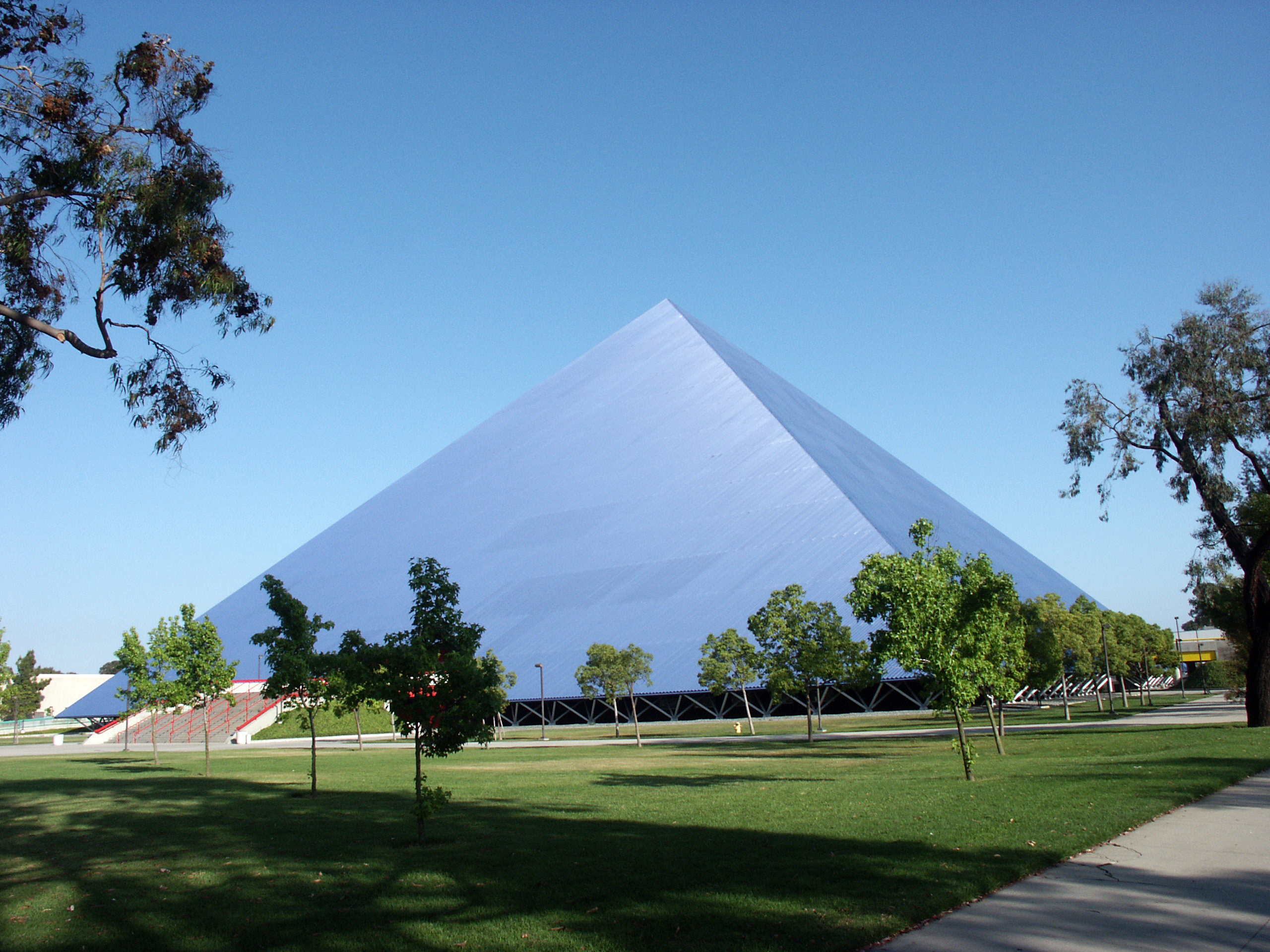
The Walter Pyramid at California State University, Long Beach

Long Beach, California has two public institutions dedicated to higher education: California State University, Long Beach and Long Beach City College.

Founded in 1949, California State University, Long Beach is a comprehensive public university in the tree-filled Los Altos neighborhood. Long Beach State is three miles away from the Pacific Ocean and is known for their resources of the arts, such as the Carpenter Performing Arts Center.

Long Beach City College is a community college established in 1927. LBCC is composed of two separate campuses; the Liberal Arts Campus is on the residential area of Lakewood Village, while the Pacific Coast Campus is adjacent to the Eastside neighborhood.

Also, Pacific Coast University, a private non-profit law school, is in Long Beach.

== Transportation ==
=== Ports and freight ===
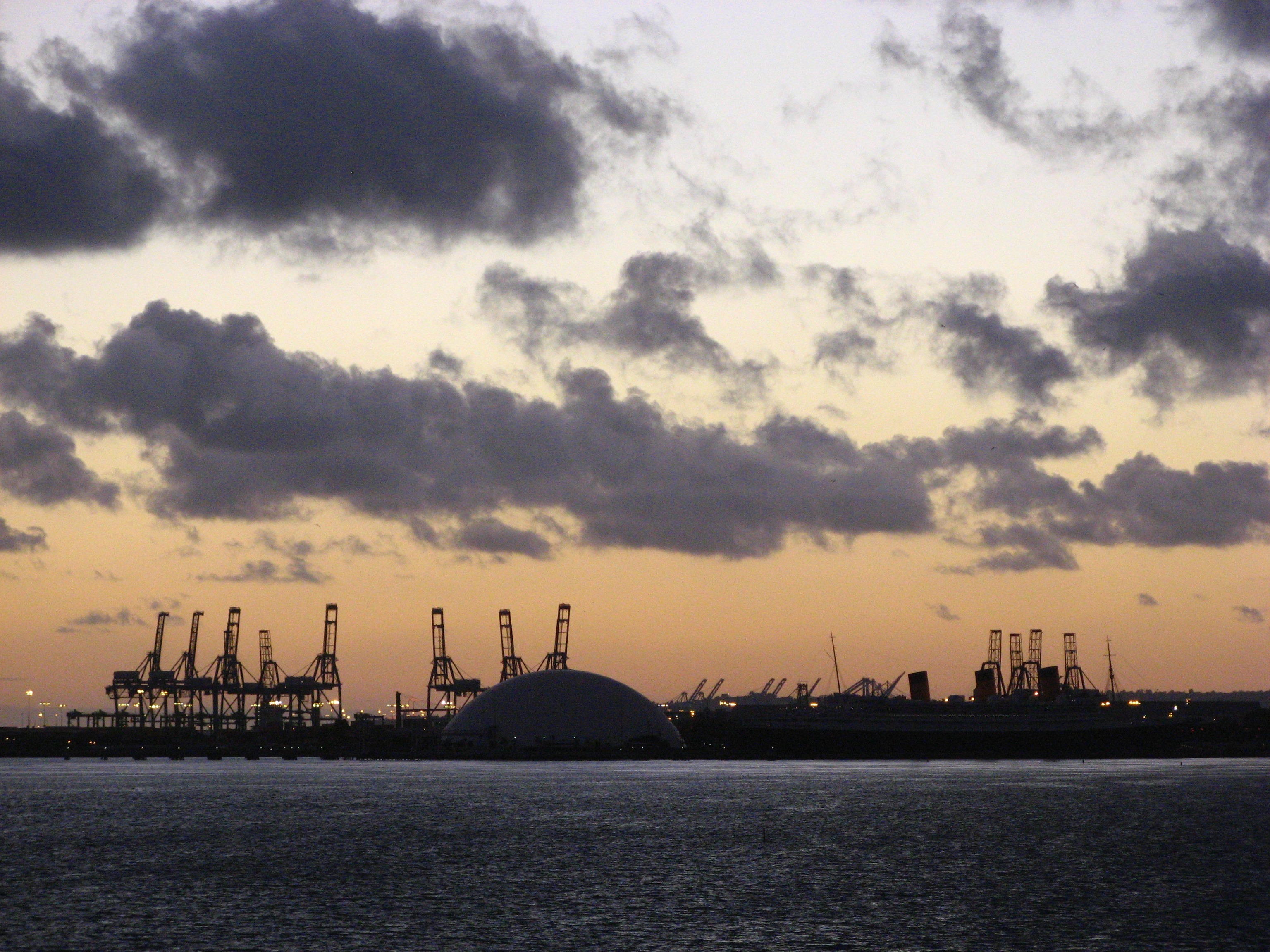
Northwest-facing view of the harbor and port at dusk

As of 2005, the Port of Long Beach was the second busiest seaport in the United States and the tenth busiest in the world, shipping some 66 million metric tons of cargo worth $95 billion in 2001. The port serves shipping between the United States and the Pacific Rim. The combined operations of the Port of Long Beach and the Port of Los Angeles are the busiest in the US.

Rail shipping is provided by Union Pacific Railroad and BNSF Railway, which carry about half of the trans-shipments from the port. Long Beach has contributed to the Alameda Corridor project to increase the capacity of the rail lines, roads, and highways connecting the port to the Los Angeles rail hub. The project, completed in 2002, created a trench 20 miles (32 km) long and 33 feet (10 m) deep in order to eliminate 200 grade crossings and cost about US$2.4 billion.

Long Beach Cruise Terminal

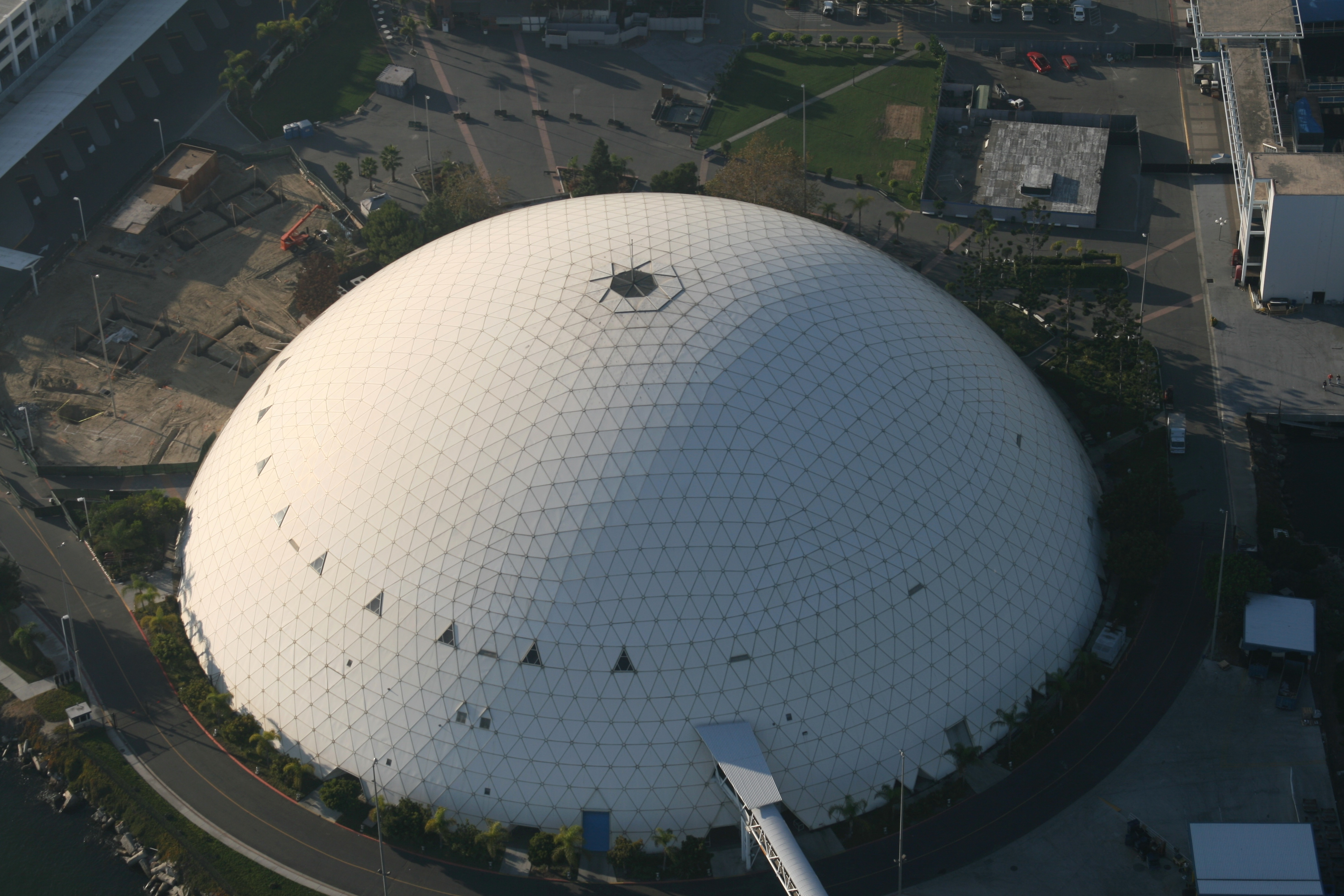
Long Beach Cruise Terminal

Operated by Carnival Corporation, the Long Beach Cruise Terminal is the year-round home of three cruise ships carrying over 600,000 passengers annually. Passengers are processed in the domed structure that housed the Spruce Goose.

Catalina Landing

Catalina Express operates scheduled trips from the Catalina Landing.

=== Public transportation ===
Bus and coach services

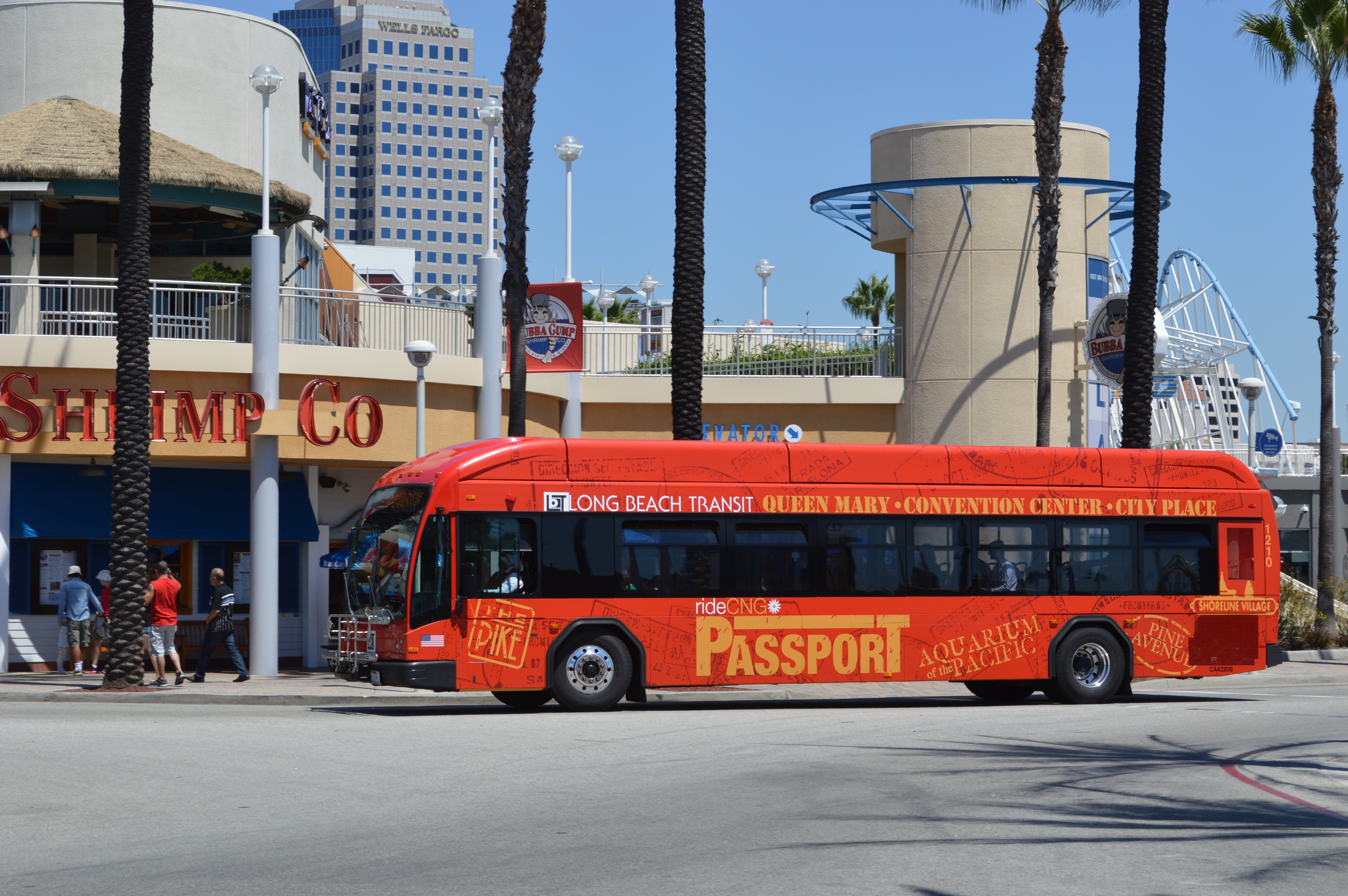
The "Passport" shuttle

Long Beach Transit provides local public transportation services within Long Beach, Lakewood, and Signal Hill. Long Beach Transit regularly operates 38 bus routes. Most regular service bus routes begin or end at the Long Beach Transit Mall in downtown Long Beach.

Long Beach Transit also operates the Passport shuttle within downtown Long Beach. The free shuttle carries passengers to the Aquarium of the Pacific, Pine Avenue, Shoreline Village, the Long Beach Convention Center, the Queen Mary, Catalina Landing, various hotels, and other points of interest. During the summer, Long Beach Transit operates the AquaLink, a 68-foot (21 m) catamaran that carries passengers between the downtown Long Beach waterfront and the Alamitos Bay Landing. In addition, during the summer, a 49-passenger water taxis called the AquaBus is provided. With $1 fares, the AquaBus serves six different locations within the downtown Long Beach waterfront.

Several transit operators offer services from the Long Beach Transit Mall. Torrance Transit offers bus service to the South Bay. The Los Angeles Department of Transportation (LADOT) offers bus service to San Pedro. LA Metro operates other regional bus lines. Orange County Transportation Authority offers limited bus service to Orange County. Route 1, from Long Beach to San Clemente is the longest bus route in the OCTA system. Amtrak Thruway offers bus shuttles starting in San Pedro, with stops at the Queen Mary and downtown Long Beach, that then goes to Union Station in downtown Los Angeles, and ends in Bakersfield. Greyhound Lines operates the Long Beach Station in Long Beach. A FlyAway bus route to LAX began service on December 30, 2015.

Light rail

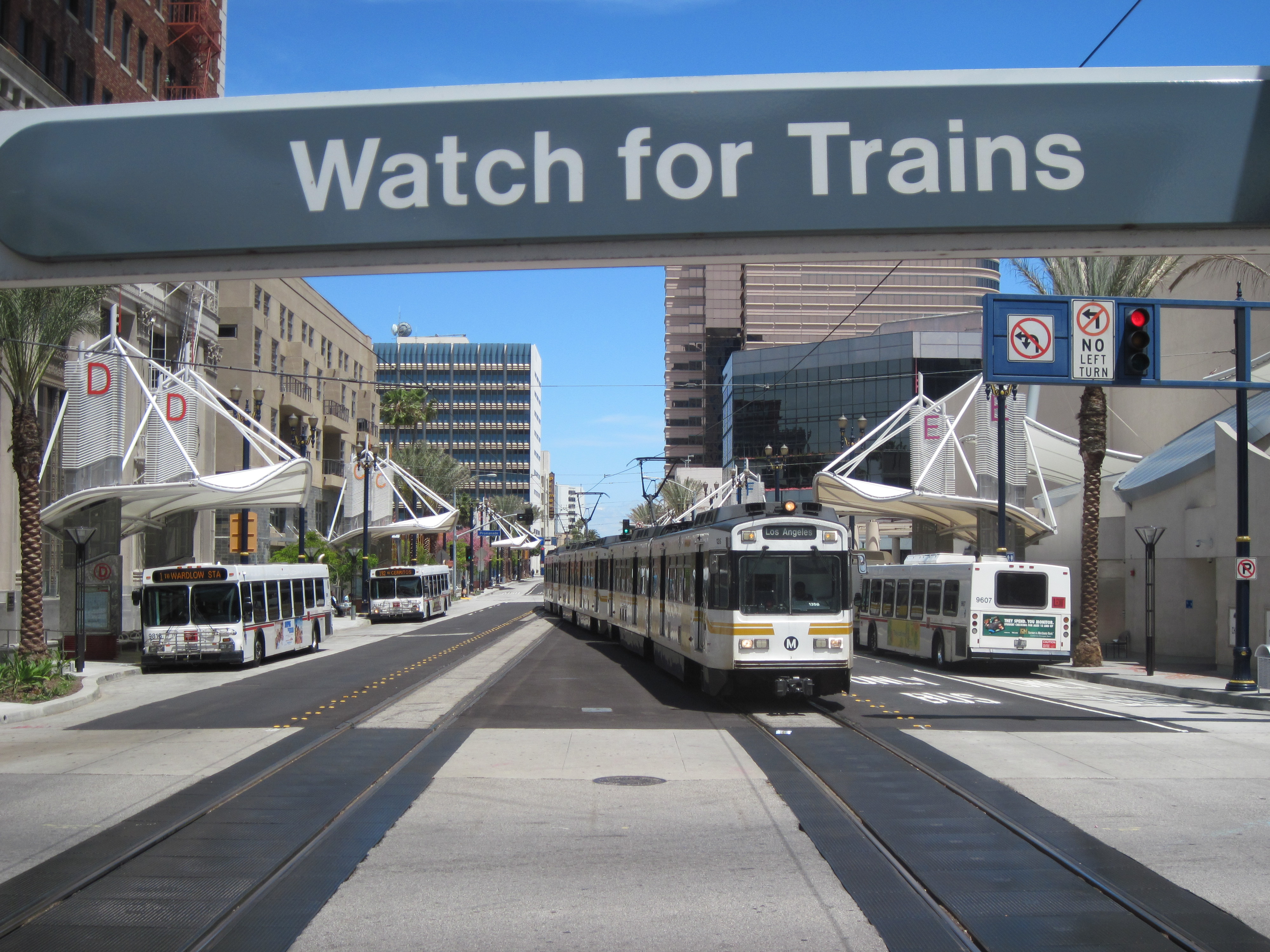
A Metro Blue Line train arrives at the Downtown Long Beach Station (the service was renamed to the A Line in 2019, while the station was renamed from its original name of Transit Mall Station in July 2013).

The Los Angeles County Metropolitan Transportation Authority (LA Metro) operates the Metro A Line, a light rail service that runs between the Downtown Long Beach Station (known as the Transit Mall Station until July 2013) and the Pomona–North Metrolink station via Los Angeles Union Station and Del Mar station in Pasadena. From the 7th Street/Metro Center Station, passengers can make connections to Hollywood, Universal Studios, and other points of interest along the Los Angeles Metro Rail subway (B and D lines) network. From Union Station in downtown L.A., transit users can access the regional Metrolink rail system to access a vast area of urban Southern California, and connect to nationwide Amtrak trains as well. The Metro A Line also offers connections to the Metro E Line at the 7th Street/Metro Center Station, Pico Station, Grand Avenue Arts/Bunker Hill station, Historic Broadway station, and Little Tokyo/Arts District station with service to Santa Monica and East Los Angeles. In addition, at Willowbrook Station, passengers can transfer to the Metro C Line with service to Redondo Beach, Norwalk, and LAX via an additional shuttle connection. The Metro A Line Maintenance Shops are also in Long Beach just south of the Del Amo Blue Line station.

Historically, the city was served by Pacific Electric trains, including the Long Beach Line and several local streetcars.

Taxicabs

Taxicabs in Long Beach serve the tourism and convention industry and local services such as for elderly and disabled residents. Yellow Long Beach is the city's only licensed taxi franchise, with 199 taxicabs in service. Long Beach was the nation's first large city to relax restrictions on cabs by allowing them to offer variable, discounted fares, free rides and other price promotions to lure customers while keeping maximum fares in place. Many other cities have responded to Uber and Lyft by increasing regulation of these new competitors.

=== Airports ===
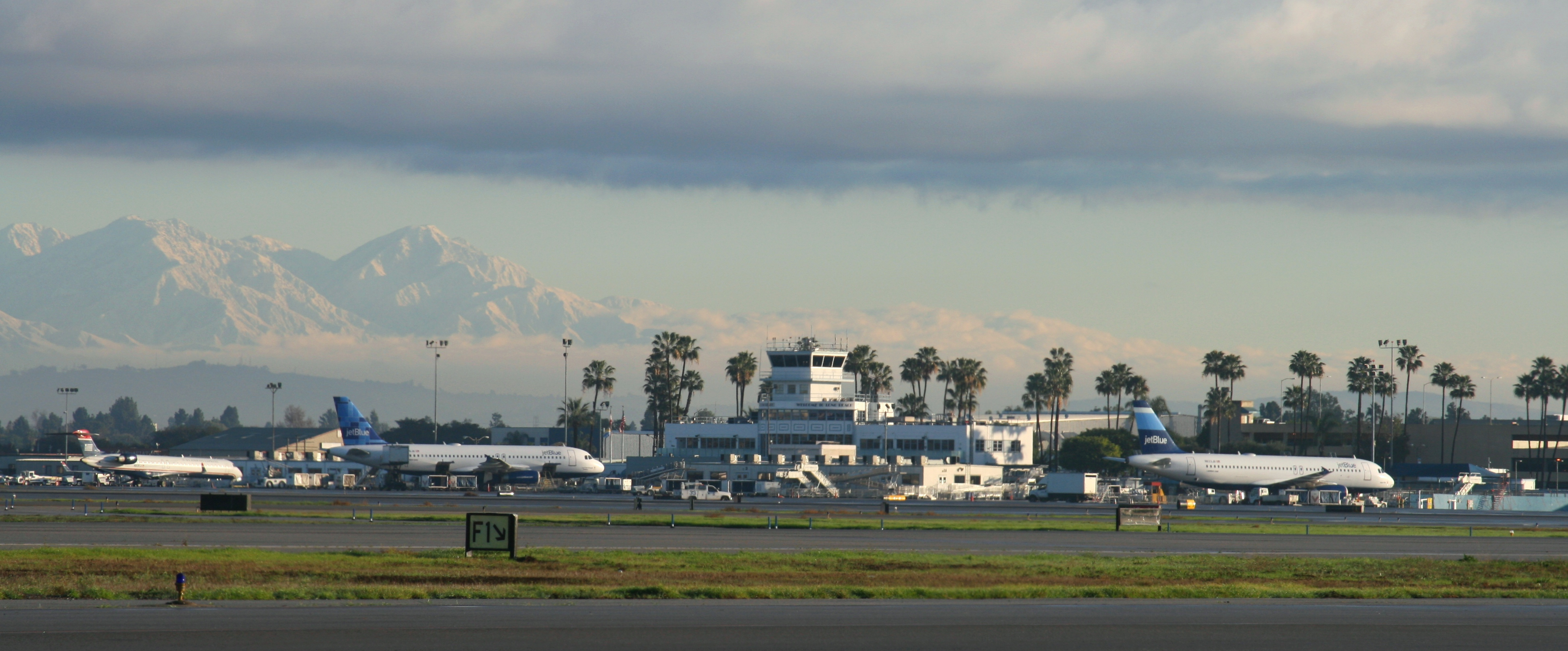
Long Beach Airport with Mount San Antonio and Timber Mountain in the background

Long Beach Airport serves the Long Beach, South Bay and northern Orange County areas. It was also the site of a major Boeing (formerly Douglas, then McDonnell Douglas) aircraft production facility, which is the city's largest non-government employer. Los Angeles International Airport (LAX) is the nearest airport with international service. John Wayne Airport in Santa Ana is another alternative to the airport. However, its only international services are to Canada and Mexico. Other airports with scheduled service are Bob Hope Airport in Burbank and Ontario International Airport in Ontario.

=== Freeways and highways ===
Several freeways run through Long Beach, connecting it with the Greater Los Angeles area and Orange County areas. The San Diego Freeway (I-405) bisects the northern and southern portions of the city and takes commuters northwest or southeast to the Golden State/Santa Ana Freeways (I-5). The San Diego Freeway also provides regional access to Long Beach Airport, which is on the north side of the freeway near Signal Hill. The Long Beach Freeway (I-710) runs north–south on the city's western border, with its southern terminus adjacent to the Port of Long Beach on Terminal Island at the intersection of the Terminal Island Freeway (SR 103) and State Route 47. The Long Beach Freeway is the major spur route serving Long Beach from downtown Los Angeles, with its northern terminus near downtown Los Angeles in Alhambra. Along with the Harbor Freeway (I-110) to the west, the Long Beach Freeway is one of the major routes for trucks transporting goods from the Ports of Long Beach and Los Angeles to railyards and distribution centers in downtown Los Angeles and the Inland Empire. The southern end of the Long Beach Freeway joins Long Beach with Terminal Island via the Gerald Desmond Bridge.

Southeast Long Beach is served by the San Gabriel River Freeway (I-605), which joins the San Diego Freeway at the Long Beach/Los Alamitos border. The Artesia Freeway (SR 91) runs east–west near the northern border of Long Beach. The western portion of the Garden Grove Freeway (SR 22) provides a spur off of the San Diego and 605 Freeways to 7th Street in southeast Long Beach for access to the VA Long Beach Healthcare System, California State University, Long Beach, and the Alamitos Bay.

Pacific Coast Highway (SR 1) takes an east to southwest route through the southern portion of Long Beach. Its intersection with Lakewood Boulevard (SR 19) and Los Coyotes Diagonal is the Los Alamitos Traffic Circle.

=== Bicycles and pedestrians ===
The city of Long Beach has five major Class 1 bike paths (separate off-road bike paths) within its boundaries, encompassing over 60 miles (97 km). The city also has many Class 2 (painted lanes on roadway) and Class 3 paths (connecting bike routes with shared use of road with cars).

In 2019, Walk Score ranked Long Beach the tenth most walkable of over 100 cities in the US and Canada.

=== Modal characteristics ===
According to the 2016 American Community Survey, 73.6 percent of working residents of Long Beach commuted by driving alone, 10.2 percent carpooled, 6.2 percent used public transportation, and 3.4 percent walked. About 2 percent commuted by all other means of transportation, including taxi, bicycle, and motorcycle. About 4.6 worked at home.

In 2015, 10.4 percent of city of Long Beach households were without a car, which decreased slightly to 10.0 percent in 2016. The national average was 8.7 percent in 2016. Long Beach averaged 1.69 cars per household in 2016, compared to a national average of 1.8 per household.

== Media ==
=== Print ===
Long Beach's daily newspaper is the Long Beach Press-Telegram, which is distributed throughout most of the Gateway Cities and South Bay areas of southwest Los Angeles County. The Press-Telegram is owned by Digital First Media and is part of the Los Angeles Newspaper Group, which has several newspapers in the Southern California area which share resources and reporters.

On September 30, 1933, the Press-Telegram published what David Dayen called "One of the more influential letters to the editor in American history": Francis Townsend's letter outlining the Townsend Plan, a proposal that sparked a national campaign which influenced the establishment of the Roosevelt administration's Social Security system.

California State University, Long Beach also has a student newspaper published four times a week during the fall and spring semesters, the Daily Forty-Niner.

The Gazette newspapers called The Grunion Gazette, The Downtown Gazette, and The Uptown Gazette are free, weekly newspapers that focus on various parts of the city. The Gazettes were sold to MediaNews (now Digital First Media), owner of the Press-Telegram, in 2004.

Palacio Magazine (formerly Palacio de Long Beach) is a free quarterly, bilingual magazine which runs stories focusing on community, education, art, health and wellness side by side in English and Spanish.

Although not based in Long Beach, the alternative weeklies OC Weekly and LA Weekly are distributed widely in Long Beach. Starting in 2007, Long Beach was served by its own The District Weekly, an alternative weekly that covered news, the arts, restaurants, and the local music scene. The District Weekly ceased publication in March 2010, citing lack of advertiser support.

In 2013 Freedom Communications, owner of the Orange County Register, launched a five-day daily newspaper, the Long Beach Register, aimed at competing with the Press-Telegram. In September 2014, the Long Beach Register was reduced to Sundays only, and was distributed as an insert in the Orange County Register. In August of the same year, just sixteen months after its much-publicized launch, Freedom Communications announced it would cease publication of the Long Beach Register completely, citing lack of reader and advertiser interest.

=== Radio ===
Long Beach is part of the Los Angeles DMA radio and television markets. Although a few radio stations have had studios in Long Beach over the years, including the 1980s alternative music and later hard rock station KNAC, the only remaining radio stations in Long Beach are the jazz and blues station KKJZ on the Cal State Long Beach campus, and the Christian radio broadcaster KFRN. The most recent radio station to grace the Long Beach airways is public radio station KLBP, 99.1, a low-power station, which started broadcasting in December 2018.

=== Online ===
Long Beach has a number of online news outlets, including the Long Beach Post, Long Beach Local News, The Modern Times of Long Beach, FORTHE, and LBReport.com.

== In popular culture ==
Balboa Amusement Producing Company, also known as Balboa Studios, was at Sixth Street and Alamitos Avenue; they used 11 acres (45,000 m^{2}) on Signal Hill for outdoor locations. Silent film stars who lived in Long Beach included Fatty Arbuckle and Theda Bara. The 1917 film Cleopatra, starring Theda Bara, was shot at the Dominguez Slough just west of Long Beach, and Moses parted the Red Sea for Cecil B. DeMille's 1923 version of The Ten Commandments on the flat seashore of Seal Beach, southeast of Long Beach. Long Beach was the famous location of Paramount newsreel footage of the 1933 Long Beach earthquake, out-takes from the W.C. Fields 1933 featurette International House was possibly the first earthquake to be captured in action on film.

Because of its proximity to LA-area studios and its variety of locations, today Long Beach is regularly used for movies, television shows, and advertisements. The city has filled in for locations across the nation and around the globe. One advantage for Long Beach is that the video and film industry uses a zone that extends 30 miles (48 km) from Beverly Blvd. and La Cienega Blvd. in the West Hollywood area. It is cheaper to shoot within that zone, so Long Beach and other South Bay cities often stand in for areas of Orange County (such as for The O.C. TV show) because almost all of Orange County is outside of the zone.

One of the most famous Long Beach film locations is the home of Ferris Bueller in Ferris Bueller's Day Off. Though the film was set in the North Shore suburbs of Chicago the house is at 4160 Country Club Dr.

Long Beach Polytechnic High School has played host to numerous films, featuring its outdoor grounds in movies such as Coach Carter, among others. Robert A. Millikan High School has also lent its classrooms and hallways to films such as American Pie, among others. Juan Rodriguez Cabrillo High School has been a very popular place to shoot movies as well, with 2–4 films shot per year, and is being used to shoot 20th Century Fox's musical comedy-drama, Glee. St. Anthony High School's, Jack Errion Memorial Gymnasium has also been featured in a few movies and television shows, including Sunset Park, American Wedding, Coach Carter and Joan of Arcadia. Long Beach Woodrow Wilson High School was used to shoot Alvin and the Chipmunks: The Squeakquel and has been used for commercials for Nike and Adidas, particularly one with Los Angeles Sparks basketball star Candace Parker. The film Freedom Writers, although not shot there, was based on Long Beach Woodrow Wilson High School.

Other locations in Long Beach have been used frequently as well. An episode of The Lone Wolf, "The Long Beach Story", features the Wilton Hotel. Shoreline Drive visually approximates a freeway but is a municipal roadway and permits are accepted for its closure for shooting video and film – it has become a frequent movie and television freeway stand-in. Many car chase and crash scenes have been shot on stretches of road near the Long Beach harbor and along the city's Shoreline Drive. Among these are the 1963 movie It's a Mad, Mad, Mad, Mad World and numerous episodes of the 1970s TV drama CHiPs (as well as the 2017 film CHiPs). Long Beach's downtown neighborhood has stood in for various urban areas in a variety of movies. Gone in 60 Seconds (1974 film), Gone in 60 Seconds (2000 film), and Speed were shot in Long Beach. Transformers: Revenge of the Fallen was also shot in Long Beach as was Big Momma's House 2. CSI: Miami, Dexter, and Jane the Virgin, although set in Miami, Florida, regularly get shot in Long Beach. Much of Tenacious D: The Pick of Destiny was shot in Long Beach. Although there was a chase scene downtown, most of Tenacious D was shot at Alex's Bar at 2913 E. Anaheim St., a punk rock/alternative rock venue. Most of the viral hit Mega Shark Versus Giant Octopus was also shot by the Belmont Veterans Memorial Pier and Alamitos Energy Center in Long Beach. The Long Beach Terrace Theatre has also been used for various commercials, an episode of Glee, as well as the film Last Action Hero. Several scenes from this David Spade comedy, Lost & Found, were shot around the Belmont Park area. The final scene from the Jim Carrey comedy remake Fun with Dick and Jane features Long Beach's scenic E. Ocean Blvd. route. La La Land features both a Long Beach apartment house and bar.

The Long Beach Naval Station and Naval Shipyard were featured in episodes of Visiting... with Huell Howser. The Pike and SoundWalk art show have also been featured.

The city was used as a filming location for the MSNBC reality television series To Catch a Predator.

== Sister cities ==
Long Beach's sister cities are:

- Mombasa, Kenya
- Phnom Penh, Cambodia
- Qingdao, China
- Sochi, Russia
- Taoyuan, Taiwan
- Yokkaichi, Japan
- Port Moresby, Papua New Guinea

=== Friendship cities ===
Long Beach's friendship cities are:

- Bacolod, Philippines

== See also ==
- 1939 California tropical storm
- Lakewood Boulevard (State Route 19)
- Largest cities in Southern California
- List of City of Long Beach historic landmarks
- Long Beach Public Library
- Silverado Park, Long Beach, California
- List of U.S. cities with large Hispanic populations
- List of U.S. cities with large Cambodian-American populations
- USS Long Beach, 3 ships
