= Dominguez Slough =

Former wetland in California

Coordinates: 33.8743°N 118.2925°W

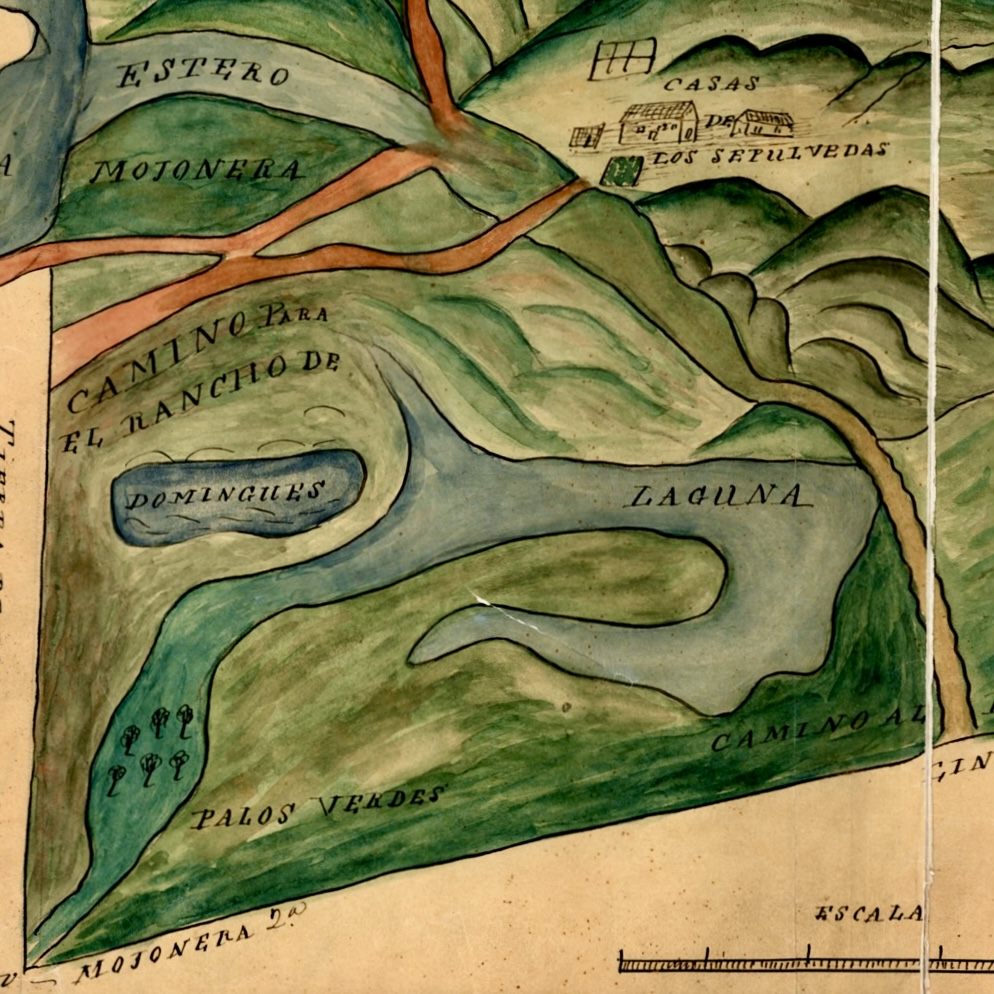
Laguna Dominguez c. 1843

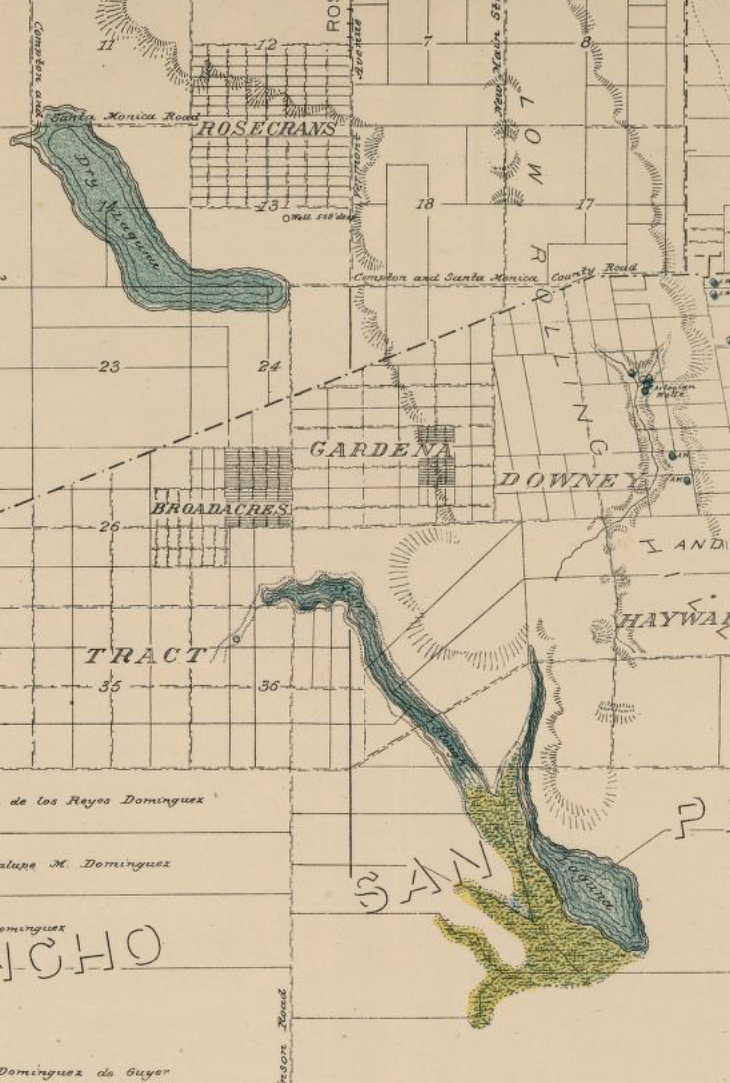
1888 irrigation map showing Dominguez Slough and neighboring bodies of water

Dominguez Slough (American English pronunciation: slew or slu) was an endorheic lake and wetland in present-day Gardena, Los Angeles County, California, United States. Known for much of the late 19th century and early 20th century as Nigger Slough, it was renamed Lagunas de los Dominguez in 1938 in reference to the rancho-era Dominguez family. The slough was a "winding body of fresh water that wandered though Gardena and Carson on its way to the mud flats of San Pedro." Gardena is reportedly so named because "of the Laguna Dominguez slough and channel which in summer cuts a green swath across the barren brown landscape—an oasis in the drab, parched landscape between Los Angeles and the harbor area."

== History ==
Dominguez Slough was used as a hunting and fishing ground by the indigenous Tongva-Kizh people; at one point skeletons and relics were found nearby. According to one mid-20th-century account, the lake was "shown as Agua Negra on early maps and believed to have earned that title because of early negro squatters nearby and the fact that a negro kept an inn on the old Los Angeles to Wilmington and San Pedro road which crossed the slough." Research into the historical ecology of the watershed has found that between the 1890s and the 1920s, "large Dominguez Slough converted in a mere 30 years to being mostly open water to mostly wetland or sump or wet meadow." The wildlife value of the wetland was recognized by a newspaper editorial writer of 1894, who stated:

From the earliest settlement of this county Nigger slough has been famous as the best duck hunting ground in the southern country. Sportsmen from all over the southern counties have spent many happy days and nights along the margin of the slough in pursuit of canvasbacks, mallard, cinnamon, teal, widgeon, spike tails, spoon bills, and other varieties of the broad-billed and web-footed tribes. In the old days the ground was open to all, but in later years the plebeian sportsman has had to content himself with a chance shot at the stray duck who wandered off the gilt-edged grounds which are now leased by the Los Angeles Gun Club, who enforce the game law and convict poachers with all the severity practised by the autocratic earls, lords and dukes of "Merrie" England, who guard their hunting grounds with rule of czars.

According to an 1895 report in the Los Angeles Times, the slough then covered about 1,500 acres (610 ha) and may have been spring-fed as, "In winter the water would be renewed and in summer it would be reduced by evaporation, although a constant inflow of what is estimated to be 60 miner's inches, coming up through the bottom, has kept the quantity of water up to a certain point." In 1903 a county survey stated that the soil at Dominguez Slough was "somewhat unique in its formation, the material having been carried into the lake by the streams, chiefly by Los Angeles River, and there deposited. It may therefore be considered a lacustrine deposit." Ornithologists who visited in 1914 described the slough as about 7.5 miles (12.1 km) long and generally about .5 miles (0.80 km) wide with a total of about 1,800 acres (730 ha) of land under cover of water, writing "South Nigger Slough is much larger than north slough. Los Angeles boulevard divides both lakes. South slough is about four miles long, extending from the Los Angeles boulevard to Wilmington and the north slough lies two miles south-southeast of Gardena. There are several small marshes adjoining Nigger Slough proper." They observed least bitterns, white-faced ibis, russet-backed thrush, black-headed grosbeak, Pacific yellowthroat, song sparrows, marbled godwit, mockingbirds, burrowing owls, turkey vultures, snakes, snapping turtles, coots, black-necked stilts, killdeer, yellow-headed blackbirds, ruddy ducks, cinnamon teal, pied-billed grebes, redwing blackbirds, plover, and purple gallinules.

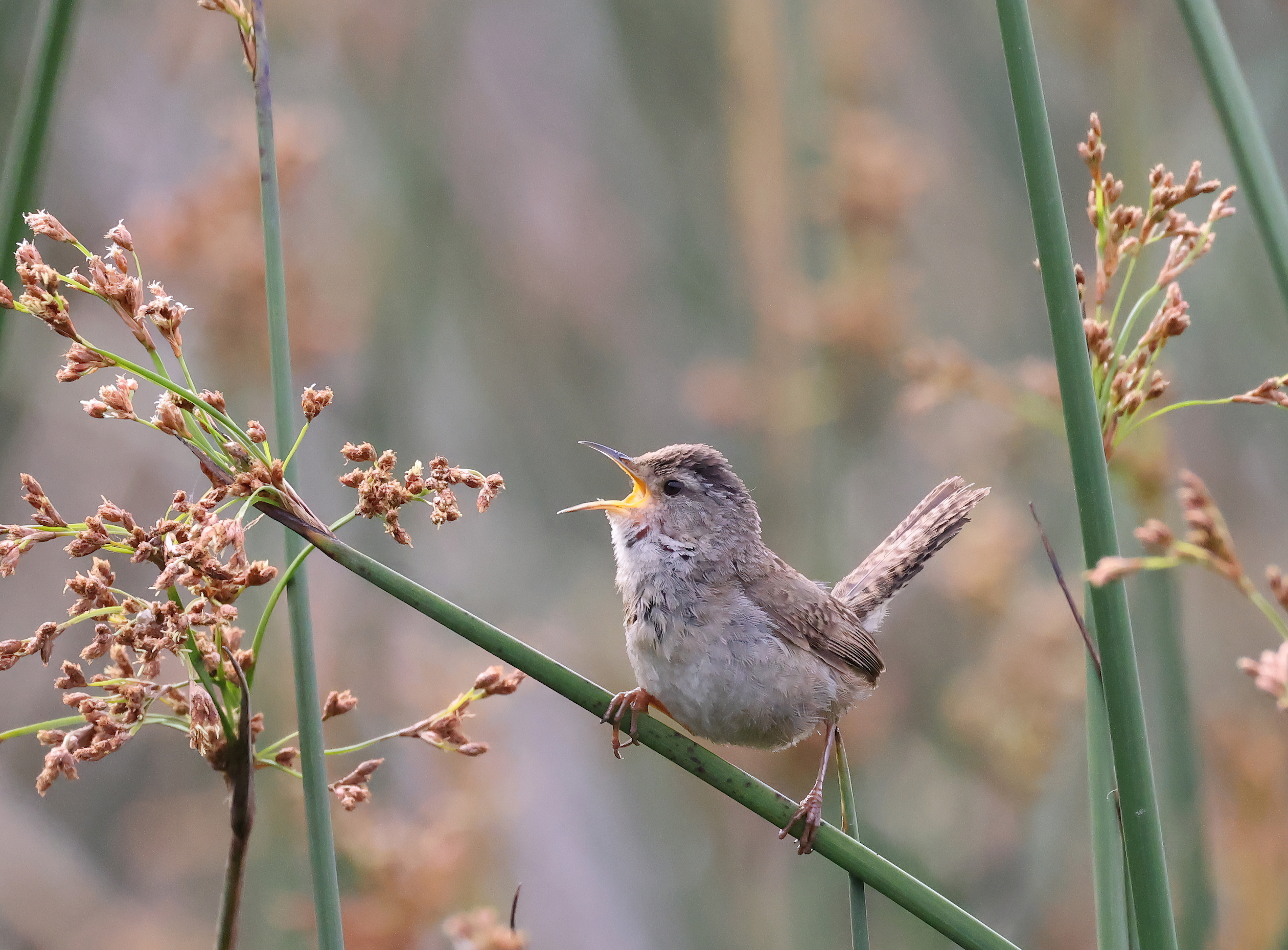
Naturalists recognized Dominguez Slough for its abundance of tule wrens (Cistothorus palustris ssp. paludicola); tule wrens are a dark-colored subspecies of marsh wren, a bird that "unlike many other marsh-haunters...is not attracted by marshes of small size. A swampy pool a few yards across attracts the Red-wing and perhaps a Rail or two, but the Long-billed Marsh Wren demands a considerable area."

A 1916 account stated that the waterline of Nigger Slough was roughly 14 ft (4.3 m) above sea level. The report also described three 19th-century dikes that had been constructed by the rancheros to exclude Los Angeles River floodwaters from the slough. The ecology of the slough apparently began changing around this time, as a bird journal reported in 1918: "The passing of famed Nigger Slough as a result of drainage work begun in 1916, removes the last considerable area of breeding-ground for fresh-water birds in southern California. The reduction of formerly extensive deep-water areas to wide stretches of oozy mud, partly covered by a thin sheet of water, appears to have coincided with an unusual visitation of red phalarope to this locality."

A man who lived near the slough when he was a kid in the 1920s described to the New York Times in 1964 how "the boys got through it on foot or on rafts made of boards or in pole boats. It abounded in foxes, swamp rats, skunks, owls, herons, egrets and thousands of red‐wing blackbirds. Ken Stager, now chief curator of the ornithological division in the Los Angeles County Museum, did his first bird‐watching in that swamp. To add to its fascination, Mr. Litton recalls that sheriffs were forever tracking down criminals who were reputed to be in hiding there." The slough was indeed considered more or less impassable to law enforcement in the 1920s as it remained a "dense entanglement of tules, high grass, and willow brush...for years has been a refuge for men hunted by officers".

The name change was proposed in 1938 as part of a plan to turn the area into a bird sanctuary. By 1940, the Laguna Dominguez watershed was said to be bounded by Normandie Avenue, Avalon Boulevard, 182nd street, and Carson Street. The construction of the long-planned drain took place between 1949 and 1967 and cost $26.4 million. After the slough was drained, the 18.2 mi (29.3 km) infrastructure became known as Laguna Dominguez Channel or simply Dominguez Channel, a chute to the sea bordered by "oil refineries, industrial sites, and tract housing." Dominguez Slough survives in fragmentary form in the Gardena Willows Wetlands Preserve, Madrona Marsh, "'Devil's Dip' at Chester Washington Golf Course...a wetland inside a mobile home park [Carson Harbor Village]...Victoria Regional Park/Golf Course in Carson [was] also part of it." Devil's Dip is part of Anderson Wash, considered a tributary of Dominguez Slough. Another section of Anderson Wash still existed in 2009 as a somewhat undisturbed "sliver of coastal sage scrub and riparian vegetation along the south side of the 105 Fwy., just west of Normandie Ave. It includes a railroad right-of-way and is located on a steep slope with established houses above, so is arguably relatively secure."

== Additional images ==
Dominguez Slough & Laguna Dominguez Channel
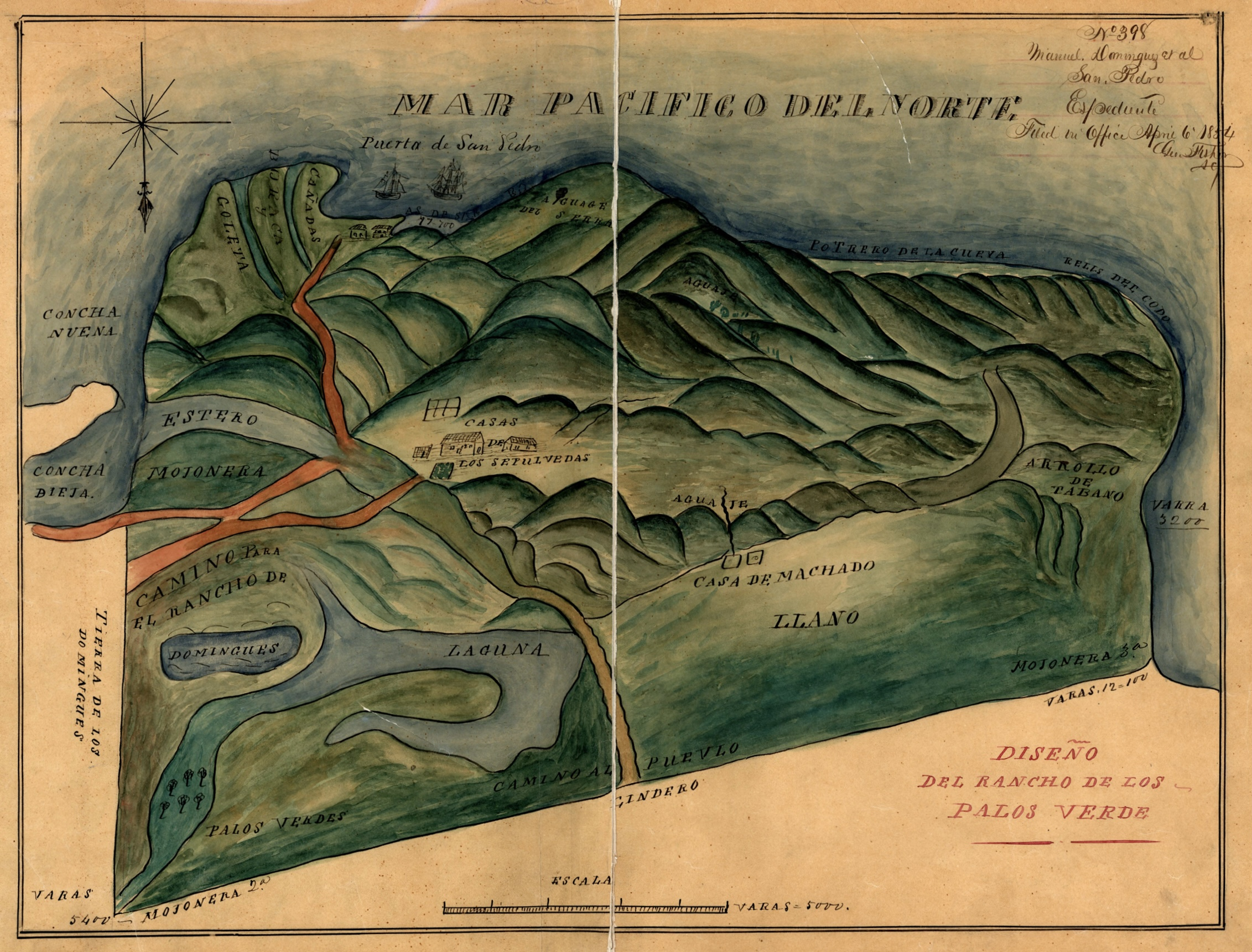
1843 diseño showing bodies of water in the area

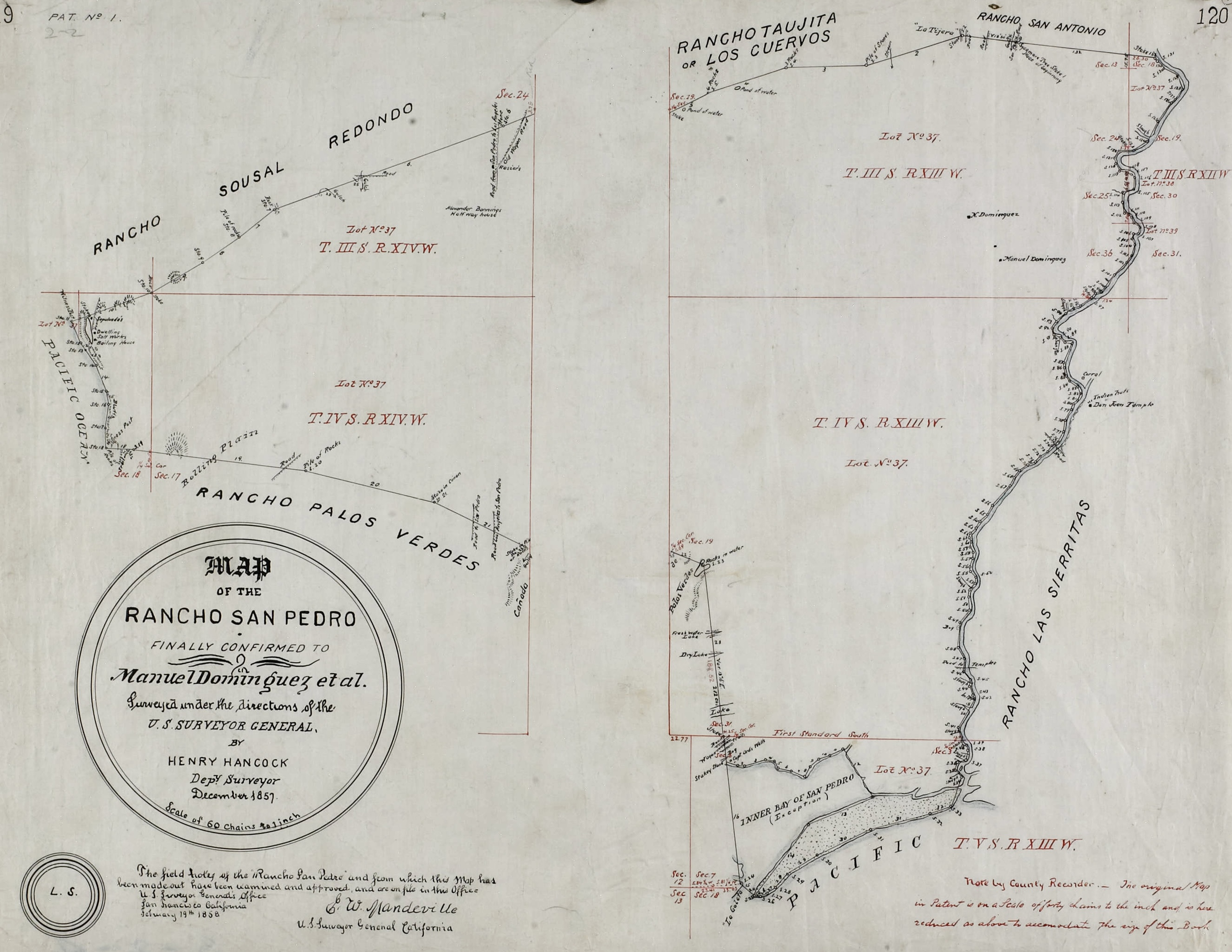
1857 survey mentions freshwater lakes near the Rancho San Pedro–Rancho Palos Verdes border

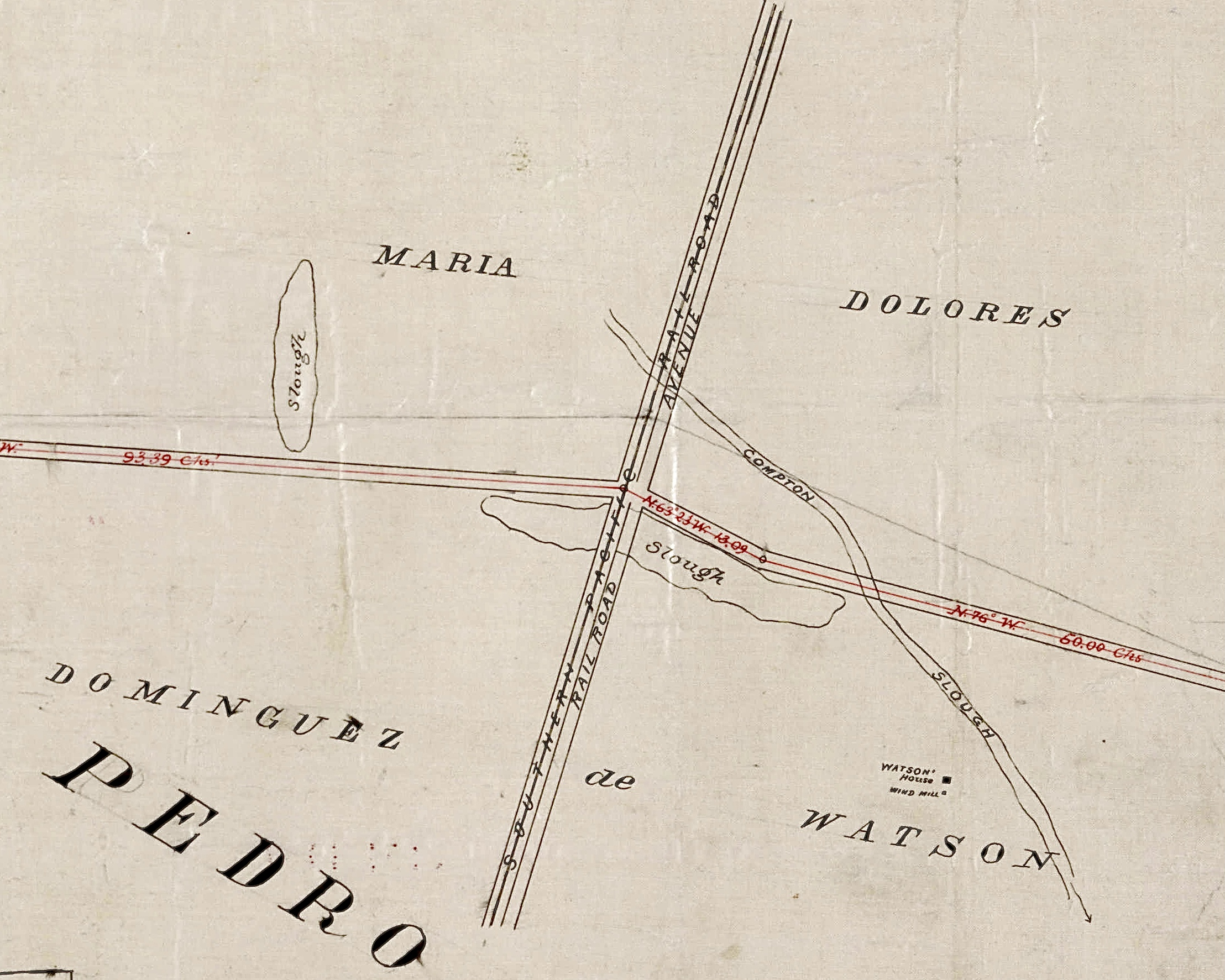
Compton Creek and Dominguez Slough on old Rancho San Pedro lands near San Gabriel River

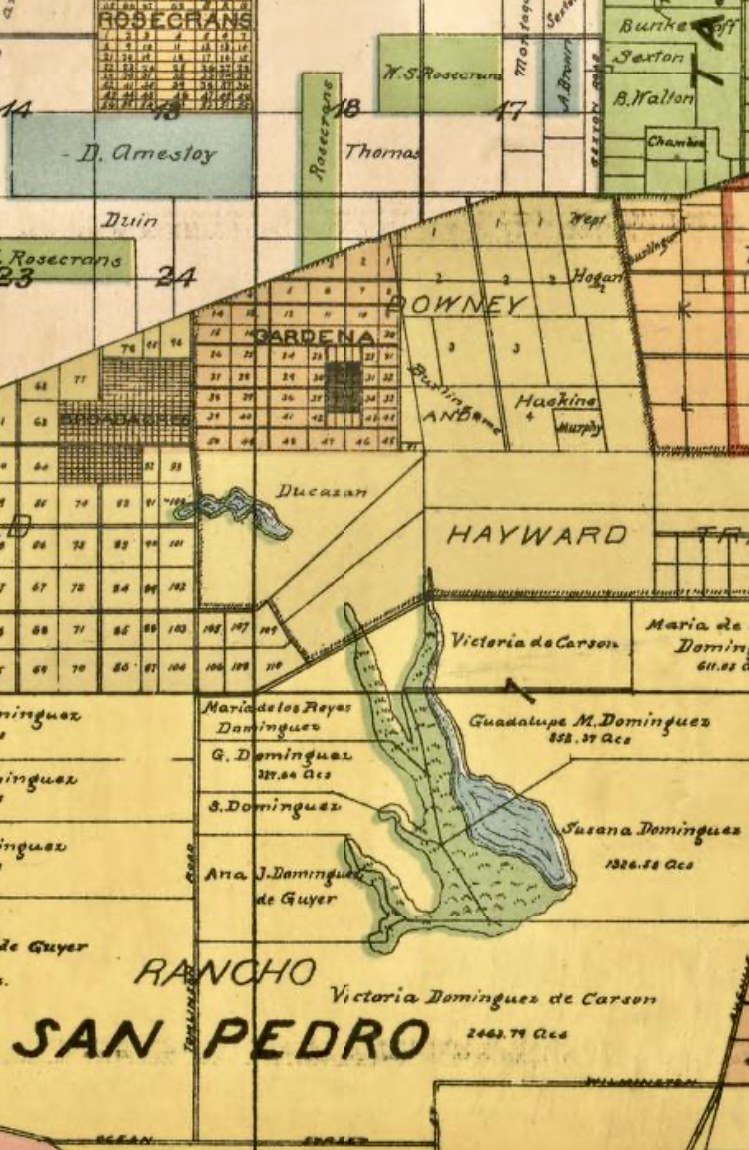
Las lagunas Dominguez (Dominguez lakes), 1888

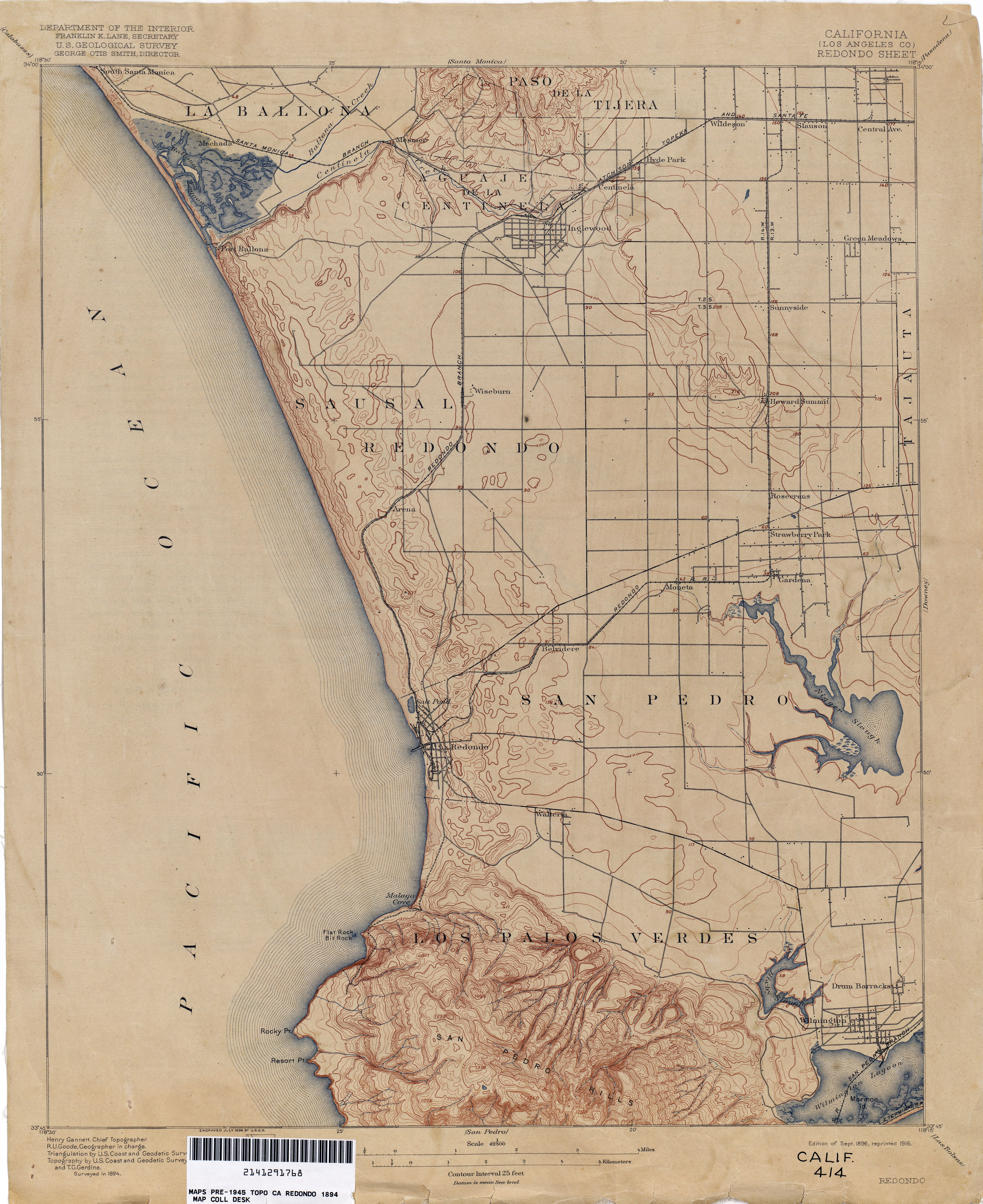
The 1890 USGS Redondo Quadrangle map shows five of Southern California's 19th-century wetlands: Dominguez Slough, Bixby Slough, Ballona, the Old Salt Lake at Redondo, and Wilmington Lagoon

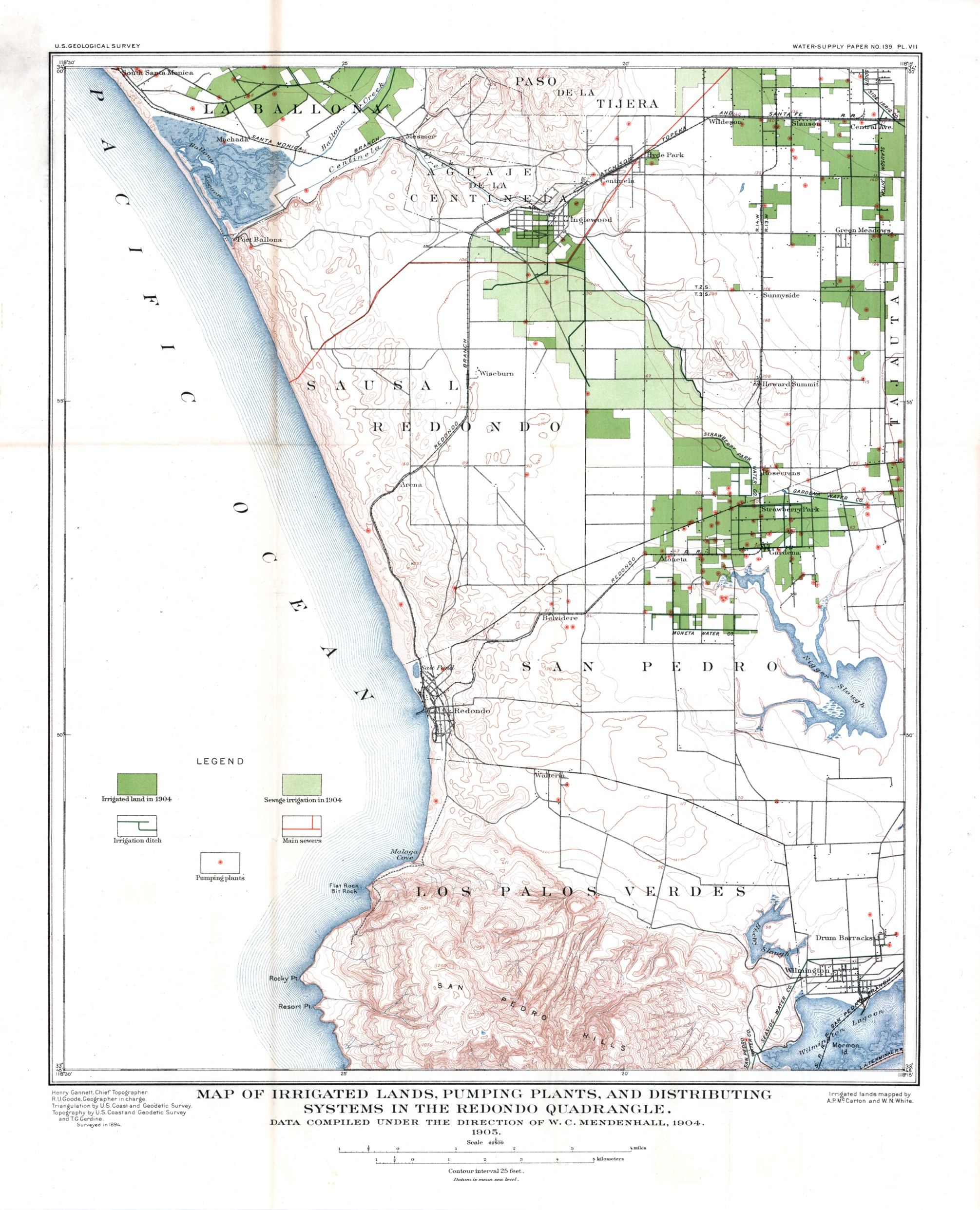
Plate 7 from Development of underground waters in the western coastal plain region of southern California (1905)

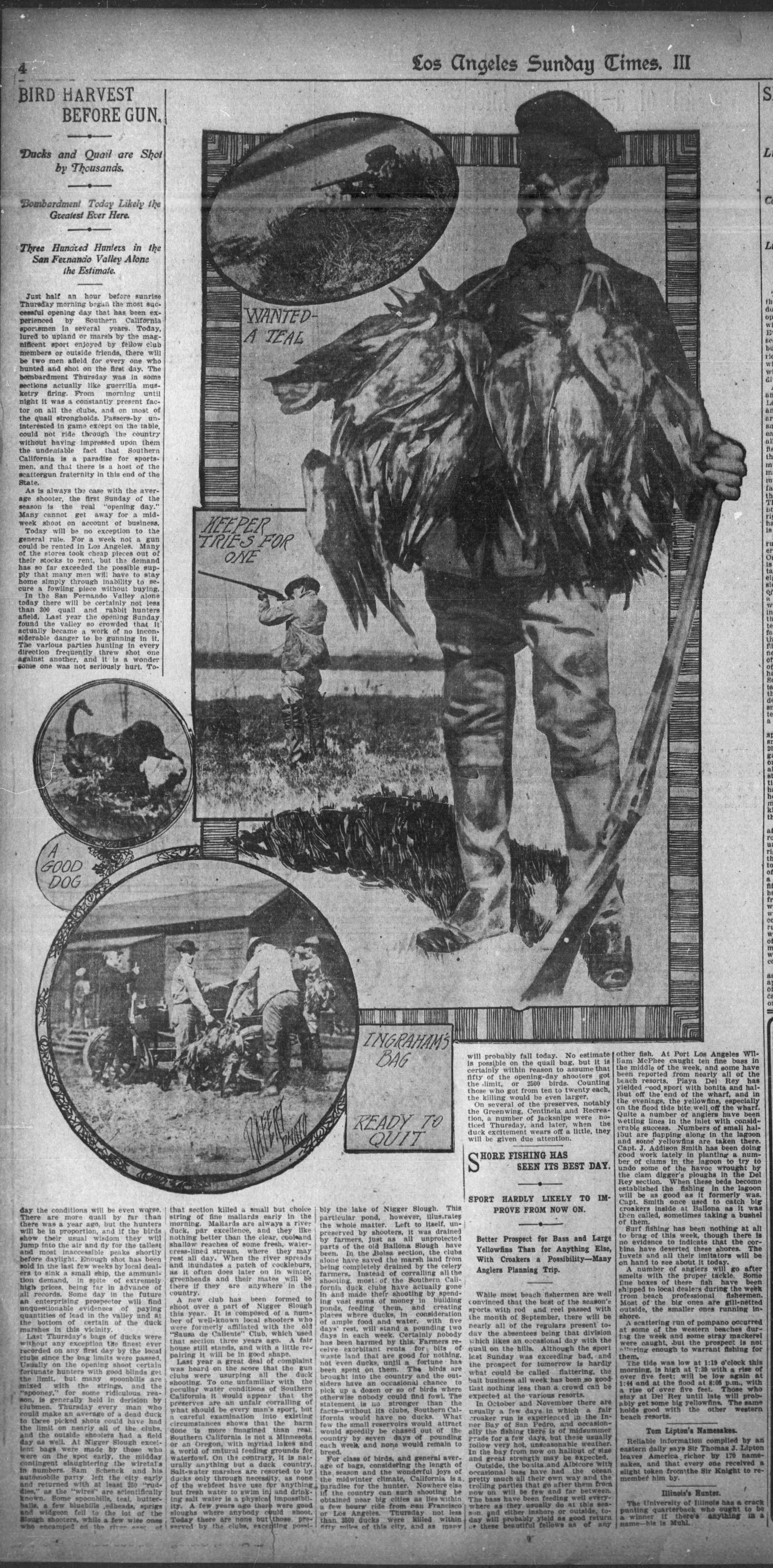
Los Angeles Times, 1903

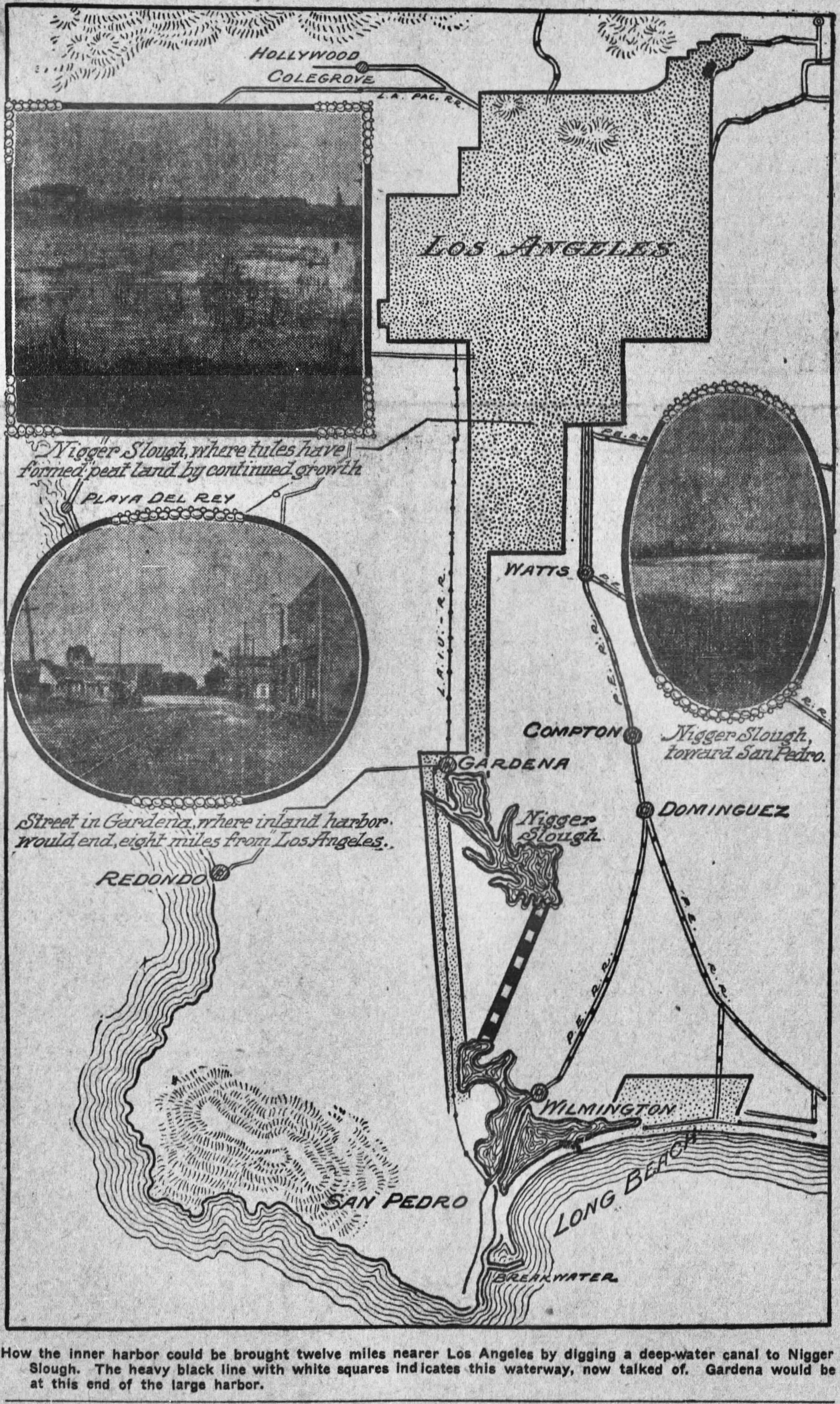
Schematic of plan to build a ship canal between Dominguez Slough and Bixby Slough to create a harbor (Los Angeles Times, August 11, 1907)

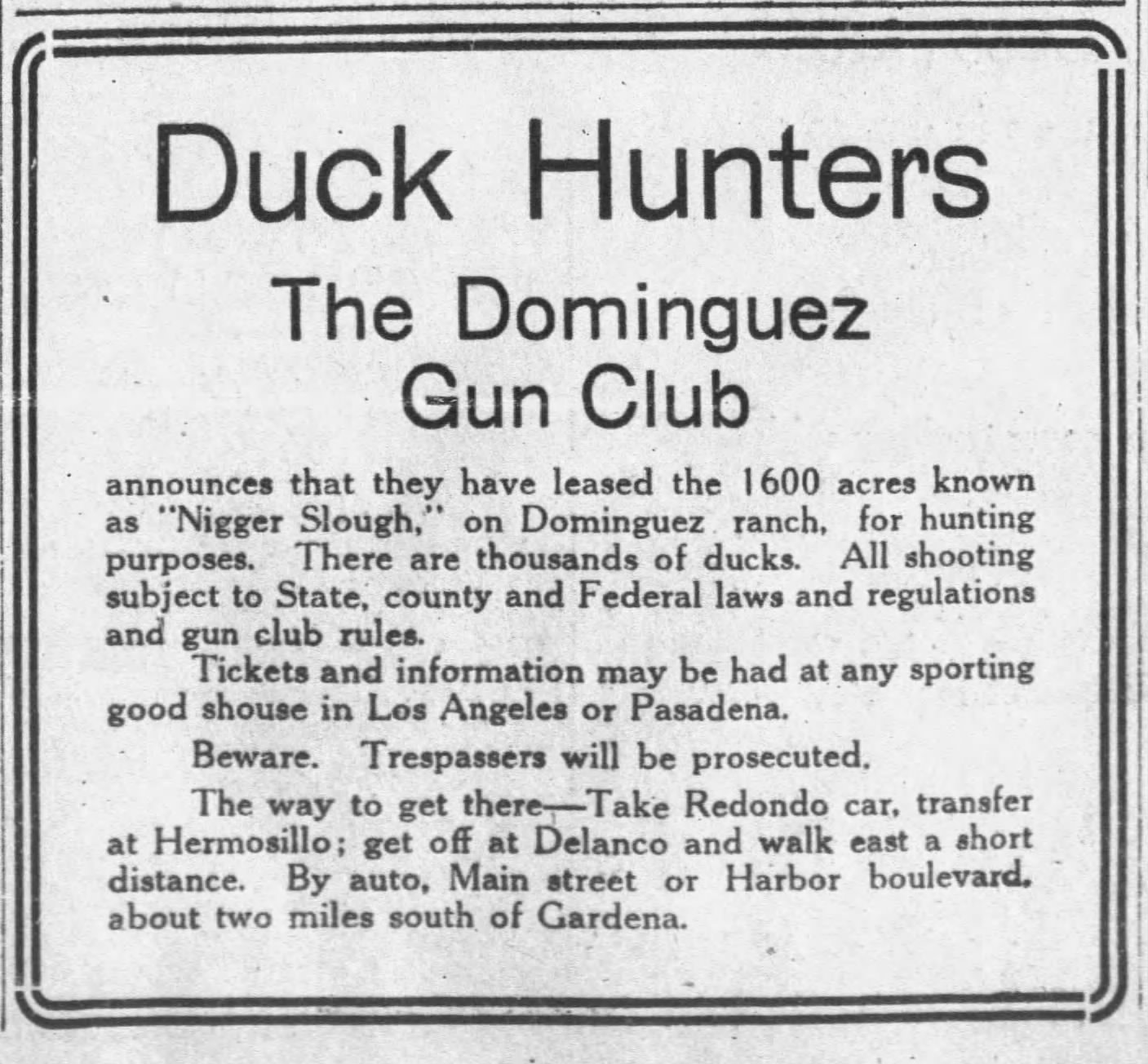
Los Angeles Times, 1914

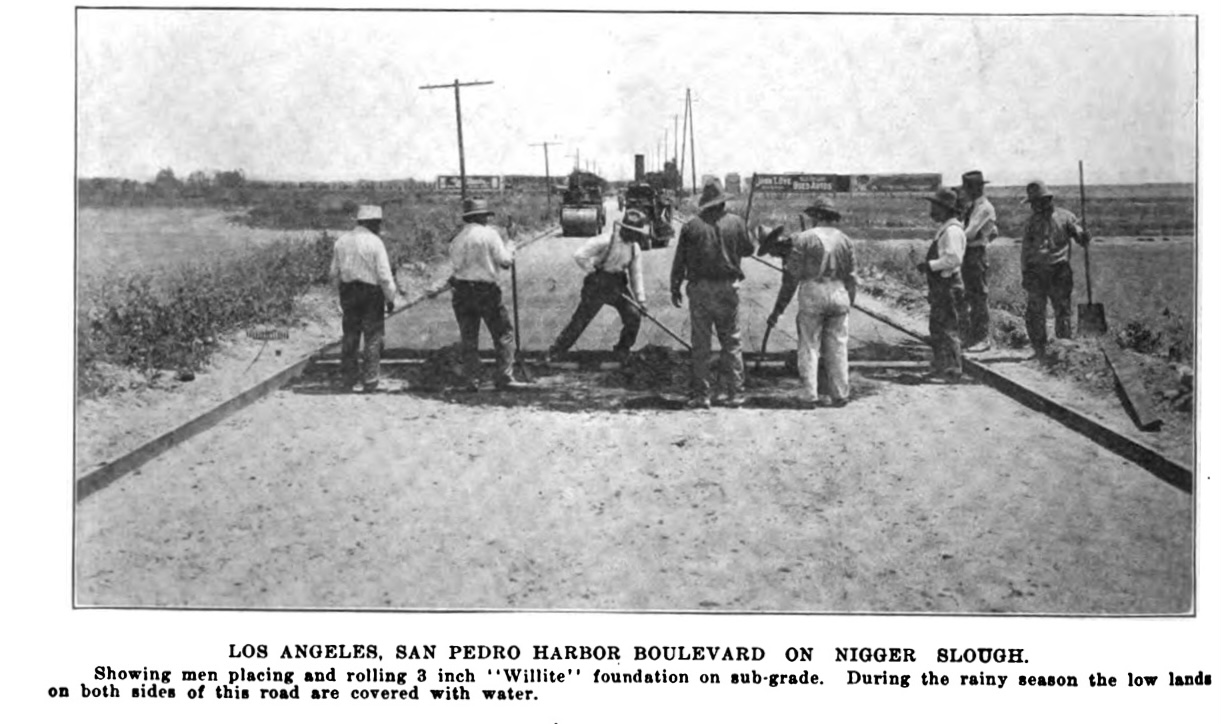
Paving "San Pedro Harbor Boulevard" through the slough, June 1919

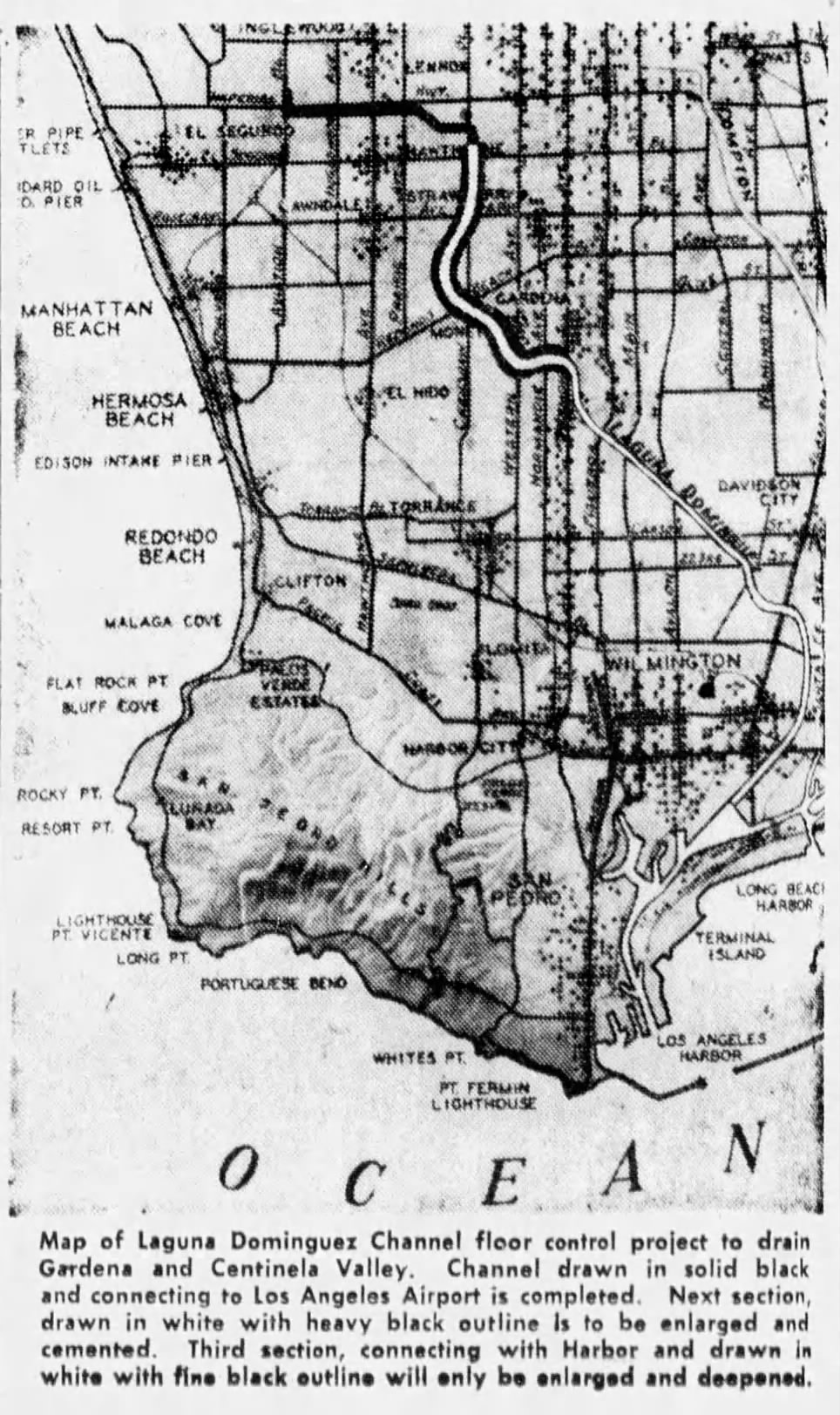
"Dominguez Channel Plan" (Gardena Valley News and Gardena Tribune, March 8, 1956)

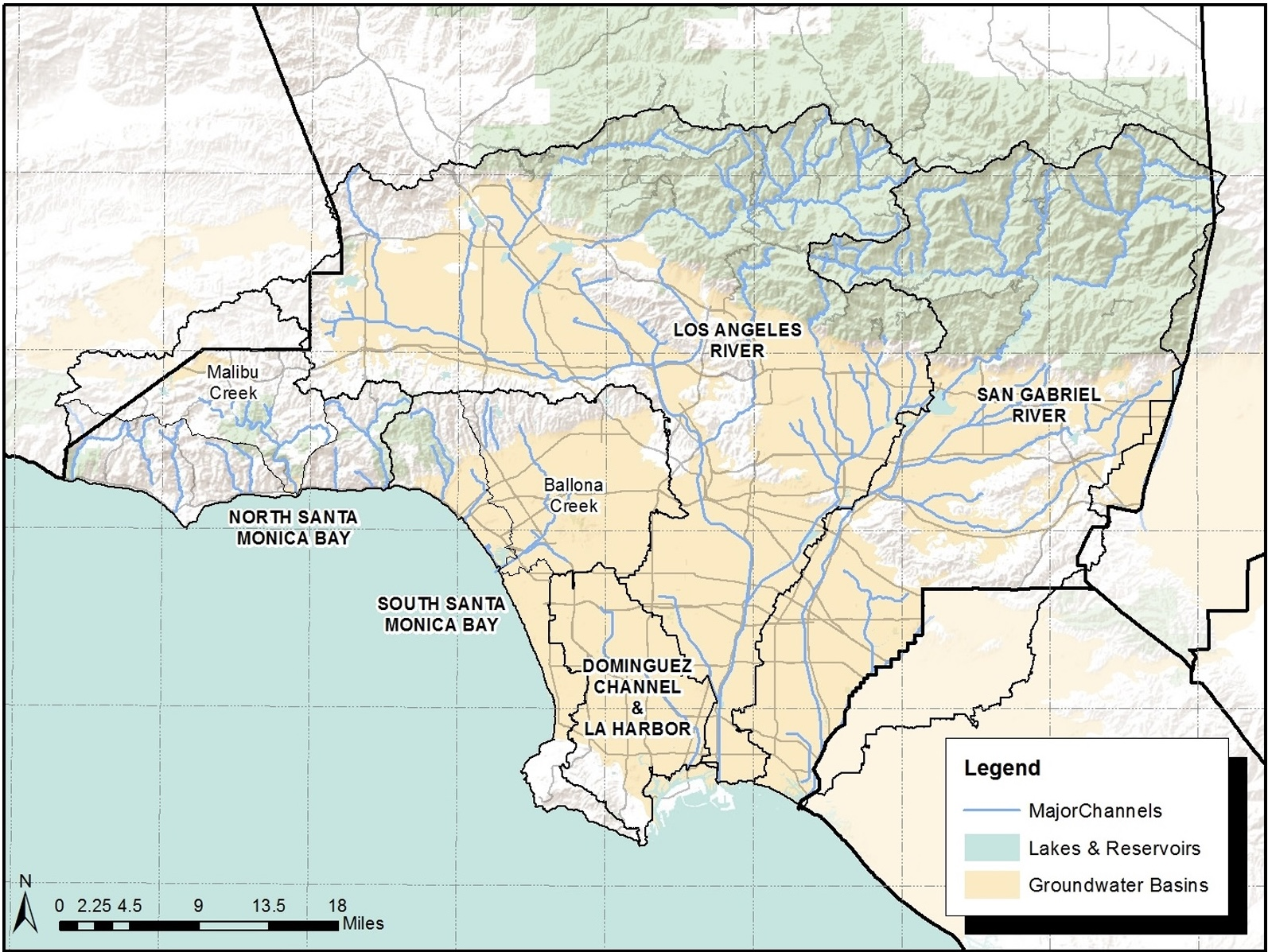
Dominguez Channel is one of the major watersheds of L.A. County

== See also ==
- Use of nigger in proper names
- Redondo Beach via Gardena Line
- San Pedro via Gardena Line
- Magic Johnson Park
- Moneta, California
- West Athens, California
- Willowbrook, California
- Dominguez Oil Field
