= Moneta, California =

Archaic placename, Los Angeles County, U.S.

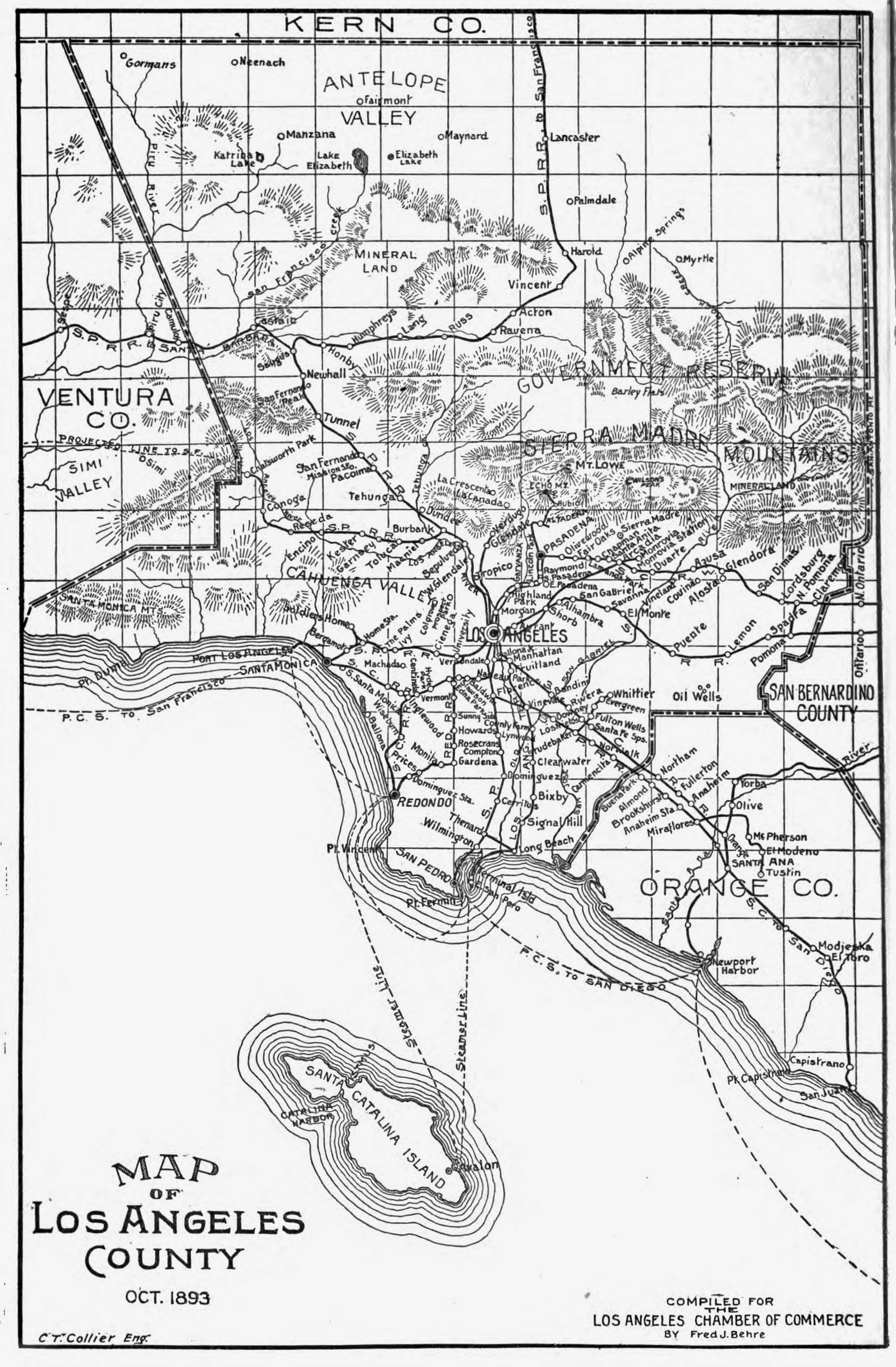
"Monita" on a map of Los Angeles County published October 1893 for the World's Columbian Exposition

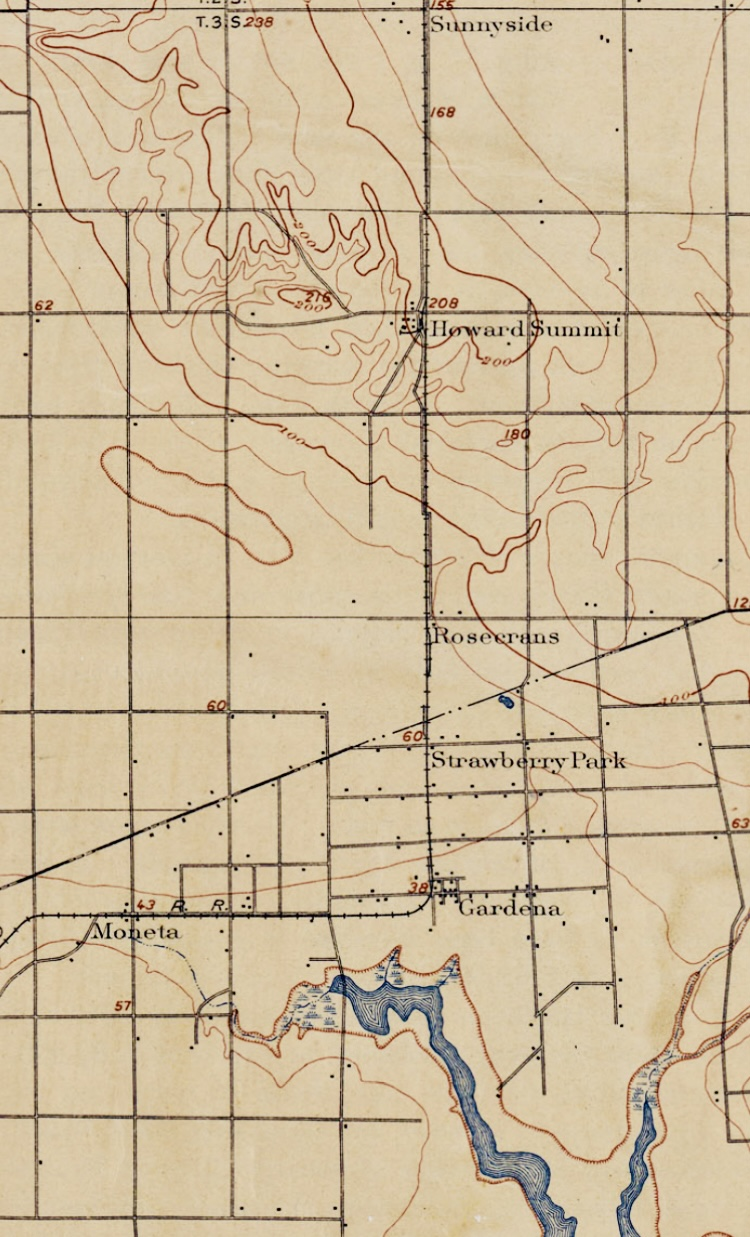
Moneta, Gardena, Strawberry Park, as surveyed in 1894; the body of water at the bottom of the frame was then called Nigger Slough, later Dominguez Slough, and survives today in fragmentary form as Gardena Willows Wetland Preserve

Moneta, California was one of the paper towns established in Southern California in the United States during the 1887 land boom. Predominantly a Japanese-American farming community prior to World War II, Moneta and Strawberry Park became part of Gardena when it was incorporated in 1930. Moneta is now considered a neighborhood of Gardena.

== History ==
The land that came to be known as Moneta was part of Rancho San Pedro during the pre-American era. The community was platted out in around 1888, but little was actually established at the site at that time. The name was apparently because "developers recognized the pleasing quality of the Spanish language. They named their subdivision either a truly Moorish Alhambra, a Spanish-sounding Moneta, or simply gave it a Spanish ending as in Walteria."

A Moneta post office was established in 1890; the person who filled out the post office application reported to the Post Office Department that expected population to be served by the post office could not be fairly stated; they wrote in "just starting village." As of 1892, Moneta, Rosecrans, East Redondo, Gardena, and Howard's Summit were supposedly the "chief settlements" between Inglewood and Redondo Beach.

Circa January 1900 the Los Angeles Times reported that a vegetable cannery was in the planning stages, several irrigation wells had been sunk, and "Mr. Bryant, the strawberry man" was planting 60,000 strawberry plants along Western Avenue. By August the Moneta Canning Company sought to hire "50 girls and women" immediately, to staff the plant. In addition to strawberries, Moneta and environs produced irises, tomatoes, peas, dairy products, and hay.

The re-establishment of Moneta as more than a railway siding began in 1904, as part of a larger development boom across the coastal plain of Los Angeles, which resulted in the foundation of "Graham, Moneta, Willowbrook, Venice, Naples, Athens, Belmont Heights, Mar Vista, Walnut Park, Hollydale, and Beverly Hills." In 1905 the community had a school, but there was an incident where "Mrs. Etta Walters was fined by Justice Fierce $10 for having used a horsewhip to avenge the grudge she bore against E. M. Hollingsworth, principal of the Moneta school," and then, in an incident apparently unrelated to the horsewhipping of the principal, teenage arsonists burned down the building. The small settlement tried to incorporate twice in 1905, without success.

Japanese-run farms existed throughout Los Angeles County in the early 20th century, the largest concentration of which were in Moneta and Gardena by 1910. The Moneta branch of the Los Angeles County Free Library opened in 1913 in the post office building and moved to a dedicated rented space the following year. In 1923, a third attempt at incorporating Moneta also failed.

Moneta was subsumed to Gardena at the time of its municipal incorporation on September 11, 1930. A 1936 guide to Los Angeles County described Gardena and then added that "in delightful Gardena Valley are three other pleasant communities, Strawberry Park, Western City, and Moneta. These towns are surrounded by fertile agricultural lands." In 1937 the Gardena library was on Compton Blvd. and the Moneta post office was at the corner of Western and 166th. As of 1939, "The Moneta Post Office, named after a section of the separately incorporated city of Gardena, serves as the Gardena Post Office while the Post Office bearing the name of Gardena is within the limits of Los Angeles city."

== See also ==
- Tropico, California
- Zaferia, California
- Bixby Slough
- History of the Japanese in Los Angeles
- 1880s Southern California real estate boom
