= Gardena Willows Wetland Preserve =

Remnant of Dominguez Slough

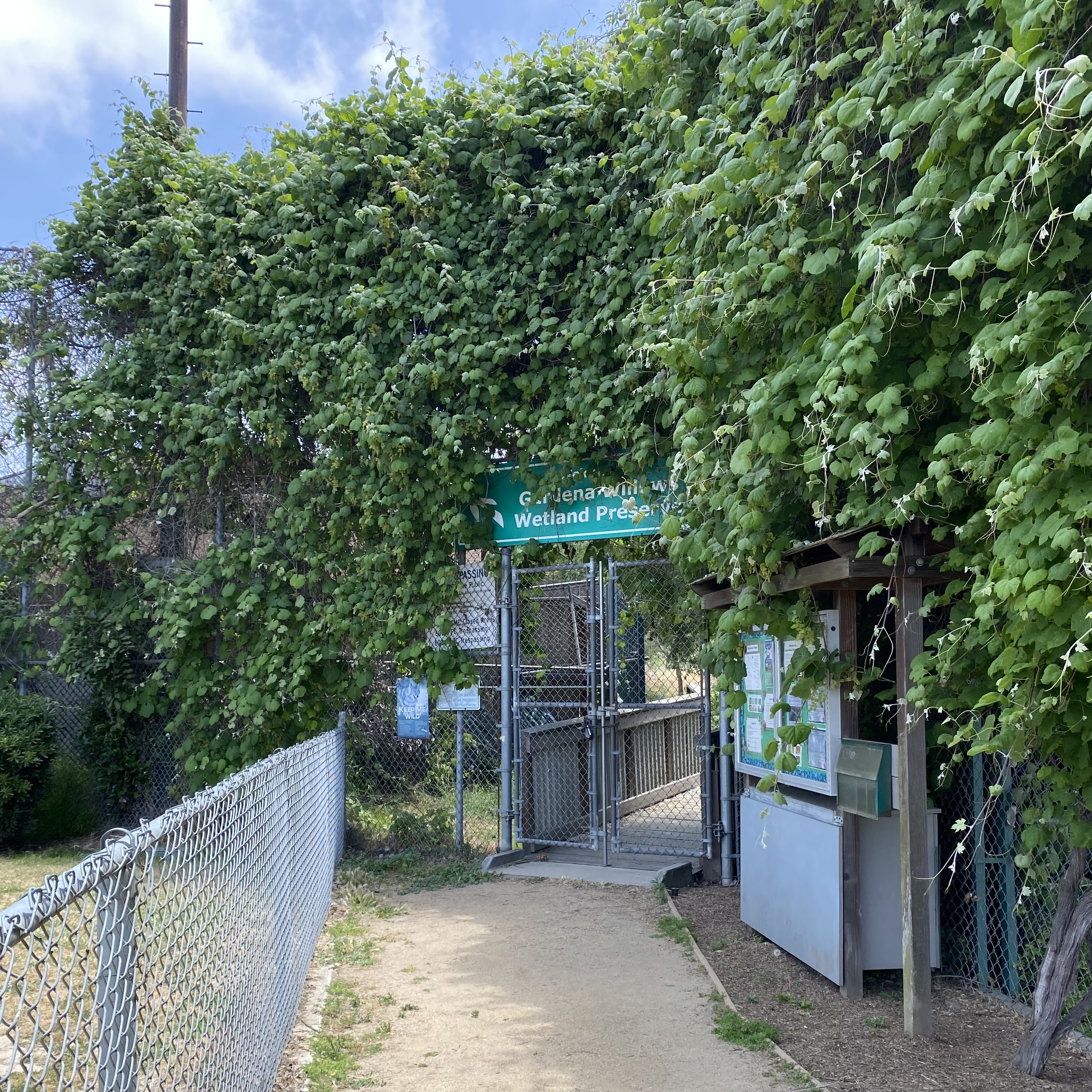
- Entrance gate
- Interactive map of Gardena Willows Wetland Preserve
- Nearest city: Gardena, California
- Coordinates: 33.875°N 118.293°W
- Established: 2006; 20 years ago
- Operator: Friends of Gardena Willows Wetland Preserve, Inc.
- Owner: City of Gardena

The Gardena Willows Wetland Preserve occupies 13.6 acres (55,000 m^{2}) of land owned by the City of Gardena, in Los Angeles County, California. The preserve is the last intact remnant of the former Dominguez Slough, an important vernal marsh and riparian forest with riparian zones that once covered as much as 400 acres (1,600,000 m^{2}) of this area, known as the South Bay region. The preserve has 9.4 acres (38,000 m^{2}) of wetland and 4.2 acres (17,000 m^{2}) of upland. The wetlands have a natural depression where water remains for such a significant time that plants and animals not adapted to water and saturated soils cannot survive. The upland, which remains dry outside of the rainy season, supports plants which thrive with these drier conditions. The slough is a part of the Dominguez Watershed, 96% of which is now covered with concrete and man-made structures. Located on the traditional lands of the Tongva, it is believed that these indigenous people were able to commute by canoe around much of the area. Tongva villages were located throughout much of what is now Los Angeles and Orange Counties as well as three southern Channel Islands (San Nicolas, San Clemente, Santa Catalina) as distant as 60 miles (97 km) from the coast of Los Angeles County.

== History ==
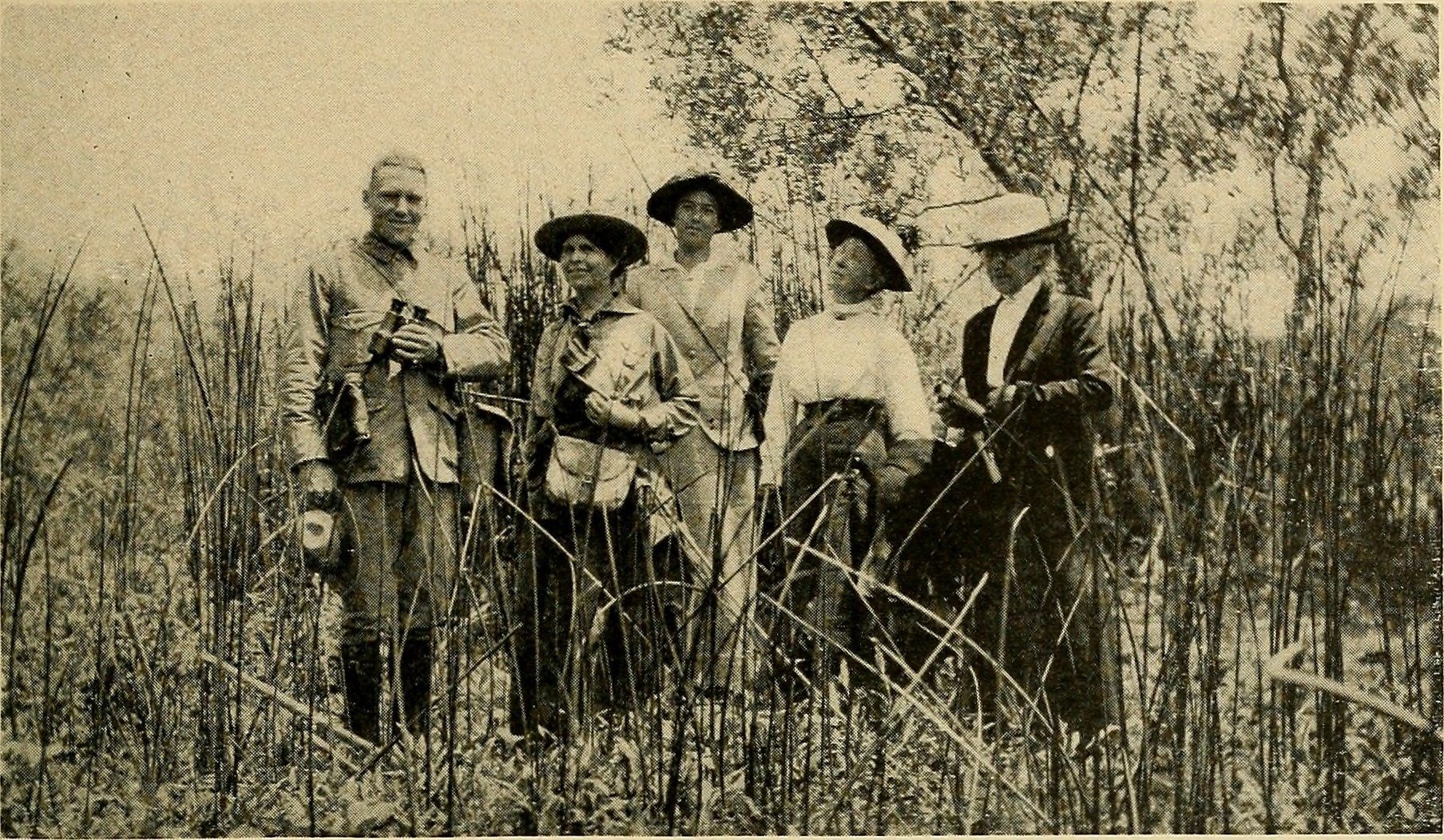
Los Angeles Audubon members looking for the rule wren in the Slough

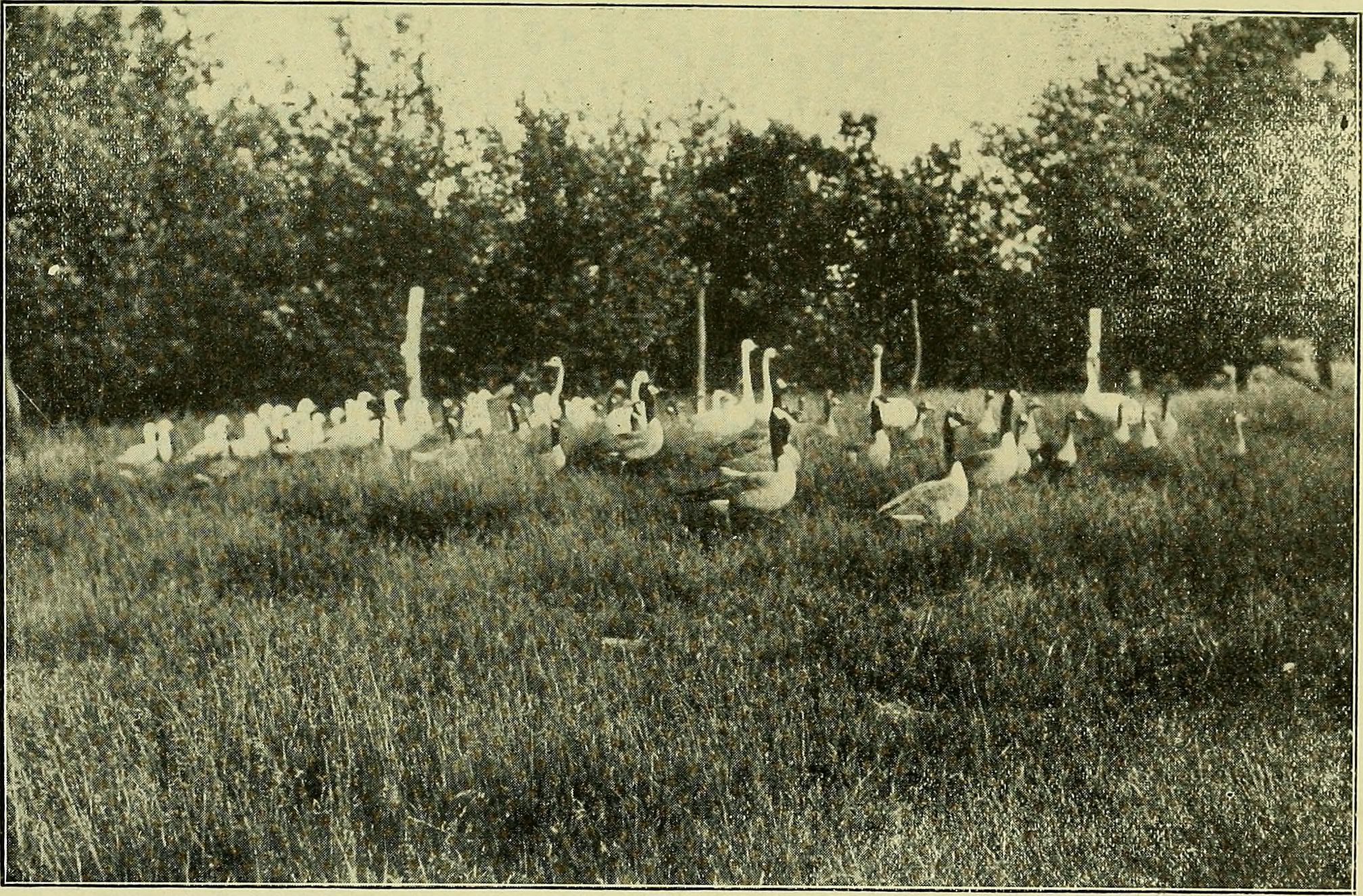
Birds in the Dominguez Slough, photographed in 1913 for the journal The Oölogist for the student of birds, their nests and eggs

In 1918 a drainage canal off the Los Angeles River was the first construction project which ultimately led to the end of the Dominguez Slough. After the completion of this canal, during the next fifty years the slough was filled for various construction projects of the growing megalopolis of Los Angeles County. The Dominguez Channel was built in the 1920s to replace natural drainage provided by the slough; today the Channel drains about 62% of the area of the former Dominguez Watershed, focusing water into the Los Angeles Harbor. In the 1970s, two young Gardena residents became concerned about the mass destruction of willow trees they had witnessed. They sought a way to protect the remaining willows and contacted the United States Army Corps of Engineers. The Corps recognized the area as a waterway under their jurisdiction and provided federal protection against further destruction of the wetland and the upland immediately surrounding it. Eight of the preserve’s wetland acres remain under jurisdiction of the Corps while all 9.4 of the wetland acres (38,000 m^{2}) are under California Department of Fish and Wildlife jurisdiction. The hydrology, soils and native vegetation of the preserve determine these jurisdictional markers. The preserve was federally protected by environmental laws of the 1960s and 1970s specific to the protection of wetlands. These environmental laws, such as the Clean Water Act, enacted in 1948 and substantially revised in 1972, reflected growing awareness of the unique ecology and environmental significance of wetlands.

== Ecology ==
The preserve, a remnant wetland of a once-great watershed, is now surrounded by urban development. Two major boulevards and a large strip mall define its eastern and southern boundaries, while a large residential area, two senior housing complexes, and a city park hug its northern and western boundaries. Today the Dominguez Watershed is a complex system of storm drains and flood control channels. The native plants and soil of the preserve clean the water before sending it on to the Dominguez Channel which feeds to the Los Angeles Harbor and the Pacific Ocean. The preserve's 9.4 wetland acres (38,000 m^{2}) host three vegetative communities: willow riparian forest, freshwater emergent marsh and transition zone. Three species of willows are native to the preserve: Goodding's black willow (Salix gooddingii), which provides important canopy habitat, as well as arroyo willow (Salix lasiolepis) and narrow leaf willow (Salix exigua). On the 4.2 upland acres (17,000 m^{2}), coastal prairie and scrublands are the native communities. With this much-needed native vegetation, the preserve provides valuable habitat for birds, native insects, amphibians such as Pacific tree frogs, and reptiles such as alligator lizards. The preserve’s wetlands are fed urban runoff and rain by storm drains. It is possible that urban runoff, from activities such as excessive landscape irrigation and car washing, now brings water into the preserve in greater quantities and with greater regularity than occurred naturally. These factors may be favoring the growth of the "willow dominated riparian forest" and moving the preserve away from being a vernal marsh. Conversely, with this high density of urban land use, storm drains and urban runoff entering the preserve bring in nutrient-rich water, perfect for aquatic invasive species, such as water primrose (Ludwigia), a management challenge. If allowed to continue to invade the preserve, water primrose will soak up the water in the wetland and ultimately destroy the willows. The Board has had great success at management of some invasive species. For example, a team of students from nearby California State University, Dominguez Hills was trained to manage fennel (Foeniculum vulgare) and castor bean (Ricinus communis), two formerly very invasive plants at the Preserve, beginning in 2009. Within 2 years, all old stands of both fennel and castor bean had been cut to the ground. Work continues on the remaining invasive species, focusing on one species at a time. For example, mustard (Brassica sp.) is now virtually unknown within the Preserve, while it presents a major challenge at other restoration sites. Wild radish (Raphanus raphanistrum) and Madeira vine (Anredera cordifolia) are greatly reduced from previous levels, but some plants, such as cheeseweed (Malva parviflora) and English Ivy (Hedera helix) are far from contained.

Storm drains, boulevards and parking lots also bring in trash, which volunteers regularly clear out. Each year, volunteers conduct the Audubon Christmas Bird Count at the Preserve, averaging around 30 species of birds. While bird counts remain strong, any birds nesting or feeding at or near ground level at the Preserve risk nest predation or being killed by raccoons, nonnative squirrels, and semi-feral cats. These predatory ground mammals may also reduce populations of amphibians and reptiles. The threat from feral cats has been decreased significantly, apparently by the appearance of coyotes at the preserve.

== Access ==
The upland area which surrounds the wetland includes the Perimeter Trail, about 3/4 mile (1.2 km) long, from which the public can view the upland, wetlands and wildlife. From the Trail, the public can access the Overlook Deck and ZigZag Bridge, both of which afford closer views, without disturbing wildlife. This basic infrastructure was built around 2001.

From then until 2006, occasional volunteer work days were organized at the preserve. Dedicated management of the preserve began in 2007 with the formation of the non-profit corporation, Friends of Gardena Willows Wetland Preserve, Inc., a 501(c)(3) California tax-exempt nonprofit corporation. The preserve has no fixed revenue stream and no staff members. The preserve is closed to the public except for monthly events. The Board sponsors a variety of activities to attract both children and adults into the preserve.

When open, the public are welcome to walk through the Preserve or take one of the themed self-guided tours. All of these regularly scheduled events are offered free of charge, though donations are welcome. They are held with the stated goal of educating the public on the importance of the Preserve, how it fits into the larger environmental picture and how each person can contribute to the viability and health of this wetland preserve, a vestige of a once-great watershed.

The preserve is in walking distance of the Harbor Gateway Transit Center stop of the J Line.

== See also ==
- Ballona Wetlands
- Los Cerritos Wetlands
- Madrona Marsh
- Bixby Slough
  - Bixby Marshland
  - Ken Malloy Harbor Regional Park
- Los Angeles River
