= Bixby Slough =

Historic wetland in California

Coordinates: 33.7836°N 118.2930°W

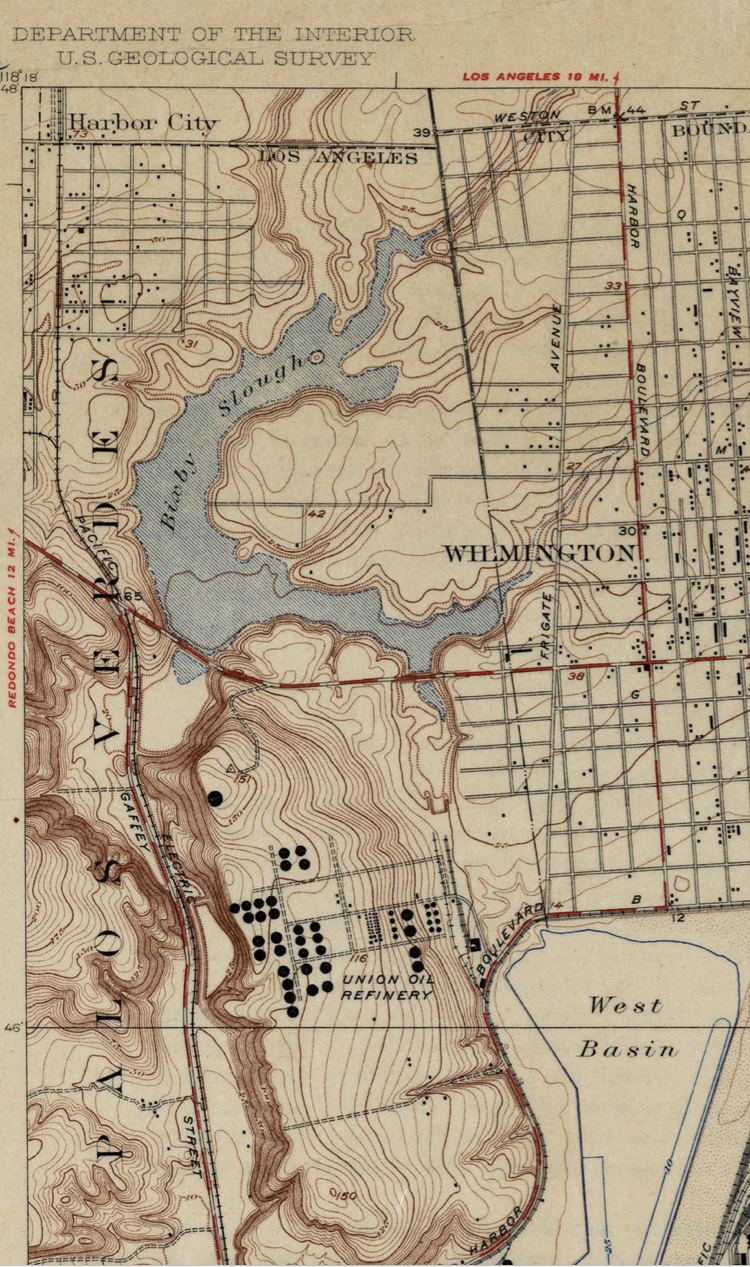
Bixby Slough, 1924 (USGS topographical map of Wilmington)

Bixby Slough (American English pronunciation: “slew/slu”) was an ancient wetland in Los Angeles County, California. Also known as Machado Lake, the slough was a "large freshwater bayou wetland in the Carson-Harbor City-Wilmington area" that flowed into San Pedro Bay about three or four miles (5 km) west of Dominguez Slough. Originally a "network of sloughs, nondescript streams and bogs in the harbor district," over time the Port of Los Angeles was carved “out of the mud flats and shallow waters that edged the ranchos of San Pedro and Palos Verdes.” About 90 percent of wetland ecosystems in Los Angeles County have been destroyed, with the losses in the highly urbanized South Bay "especially acute" and one biologist calling the draining of Bixby Slough and other harbor-area wetlands a “"wipeout".

== History ==
In pre-Columbian times, the Slough was host to Suanga and Massunga, two villages of the indigenous Tongva people. In “Spanish days” the area was known as Cañada de Palos Verdes (“glen of the green sticks”). The major body of water in the wetland was called Lagunita (“little lake”) for a time in the late 19th century, as well as Machado Lake in the early 20th century. The common name Bixby Slough came from land owner Jotham Bixby of Rancho Cerritos, who acquired “an undivided fifth” of Rancho Los Palos Verdes in 1872. “For many years [the wetland] was the only source of a fresh water supply for the stock maintained on the ranch”.

From the turn of the century until at least the 1920s, there were notions of connecting the Slough to the west basin of the harbor (now called the Port of Los Angeles) by dredging (“From Bixby Slough to the head of the inner slough at Wilmington is hardly more than a mile…Bixby Slough is about a mile and a half long and half a mile wide in places.”), but the plans were never enacted.

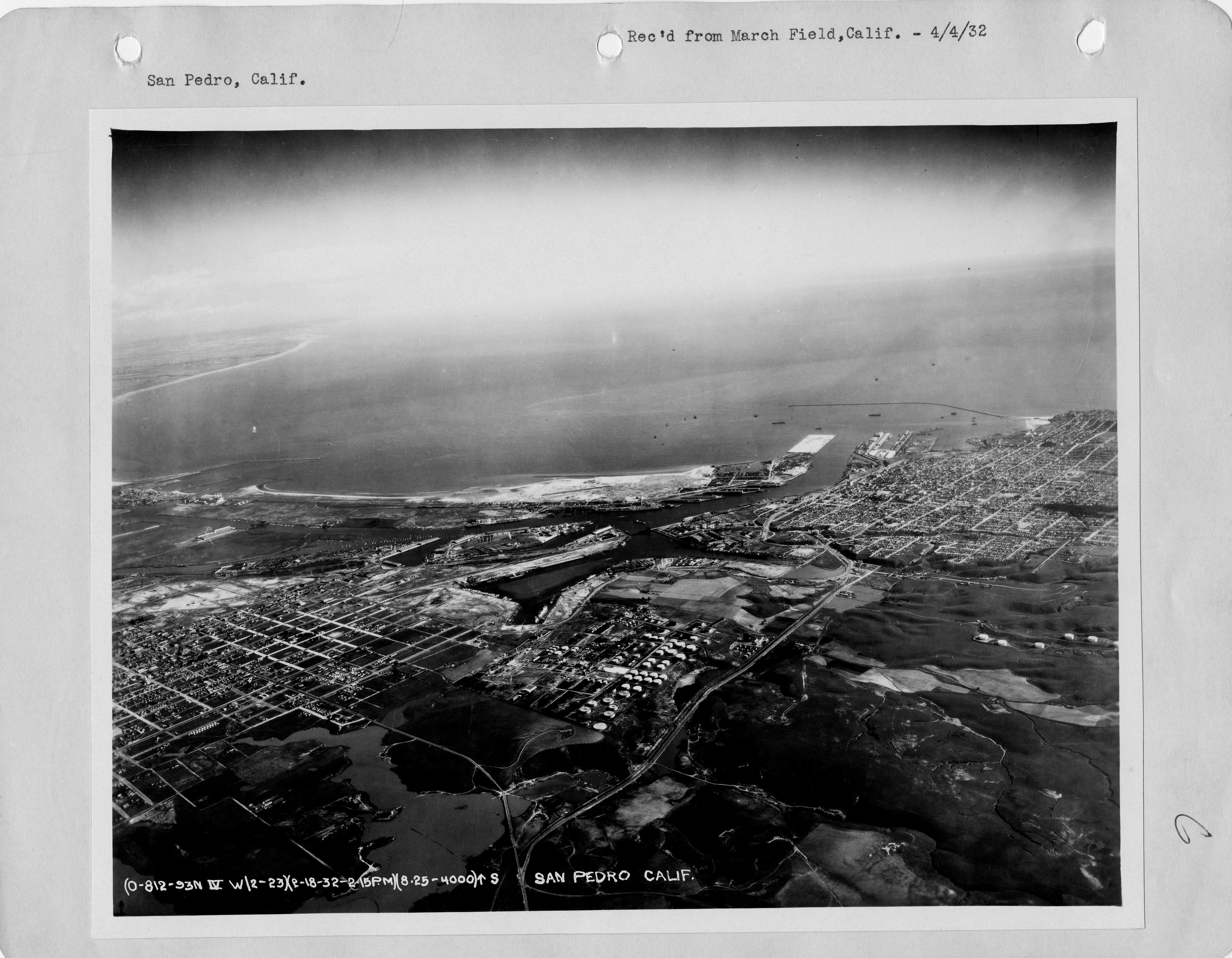
Southern half of Bixby Slough and west basin of Los Angeles Harbor visible in 1932 aerial photograph of San Pedro harbor area

In 1937, Bixby Slough was described as a “200-acre (0.81 km^{2}) sink at the back of Los Angeles Harbor…in rainy seasons, such as last winter’s, the slough becomes an extensive lake, sometimes thirty-five to forty-five foot [10.6-13.7 m] deep in places…the slough has no outlet so that when any great quantity of water is deposited there during the wet season, it remains throughout the following summer.”

Later that year the slough was described as both a “flood menace” and a “health menace” and County Supervisors were urged to drain it in order to open the land for industrial purposes.

Beginning in 1947, the area had lifeguard on duty “in order to cope with the drownings of youths riding improvised rafts.”

In 1951, the Los Angeles City Council began to consider the future of the “mud-encrusted banks of the crescent-shaped body of water” that was the Slough, “where several boys have been drowned recently.”

In 1953, the Los Angeles County Board of Supervisors allocated funding for a “storm drain to carry the stagnant slough waters to the ocean…Over the last several years the water trap has claimed the lives of many children too young to realize its dangers.”

“The drain, when completed, will control water levels in the swamp-like slough…”. The area surrounding the lake was “condemned” in 1955 in anticipation of creating a recreation area and the wetland was “finally brought under control” later that year with the completion of a storm drain, running underground from Anaheim and I Streets until it emptied the slough into the west basin of Los Angeles Harbor.

Funding for what is now Ken Malloy Harbor Regional Park was allocated in 1957. The 285-acre recreation area has a 45-acre (0.18 km^{2}) body of water called Harbor Lake or Machado Lake.

== Ecology ==
The Slough was a “palustrine persistent emergent wetland and lake.” Both Bixby Slough and nearby Dominguez Slough wetlands seasonally expanded, even overlapping at the margins, and turned into salt marshes closer to the ocean.

”Shallow freshwater marsh located between the towns of Wilmington and Lomita…the water surface [may be only] few acres during a series of dry years” but contains catfish, according to the California Fish and Game report of 1939.

“The slimy, sucking and treacherous character of the soil beneath the water” was assigned blame for dangerous conditions in the Slough. In the 1920s, the Bixby Slough was a “mud mine” for nearby oil drilling operations with “an incalculable amount of material…the origin of the mud has not been determined. It is different than the earth of the surrounding territory. When dried it is exceedingly hard and takes on a very high polish similar to that of marble. When liquefied it remains in that condition for hours, is very elastic and adhesive. It has already been explored to a depth of forty feet [12 m] without any change of quality.”

What is now the lake at the recreation area “extended northeast over a wider area and was surrounded by willows, bulrushes, milk thistles and other grasslike vegetation.”

The Harbor Park and recently constructed Bixby Marshland are recent mitigation attempts to restore some of the ecosystem services lost to the destruction of the Bixby Slough.

“I once had a Mexican vaquero whose father had lived here all his life who said that all of the valley…was one tangle of marsh willows, larch, blackberry vine and other tangled undergrowth that was impenetrable…there were only or two trails across the valley and they were not safe for two reasons: on account of the undergrowth and bogs, and there were bears in the tangled jungle. On both sides of Los Cerritos and further up in the valley there were a great many springs in the side hills and peat bogs. They were surrounded by tules, willows and other brambles. As the country became more settled and wells were sunk in the upper land, there was less water and the springs flowed less and less until in the final attempt to drain the land, they used tile drains and the springs disappeared.”

— George H. Bixby (1914) interview in James W. Reagan’s flood report (1916) as quoted on page 22 of Blake Gumprecht’s The Los Angeles River book (1999) as surfaced by Jessica Hall on her L.A. Creek Freak blog (2021)

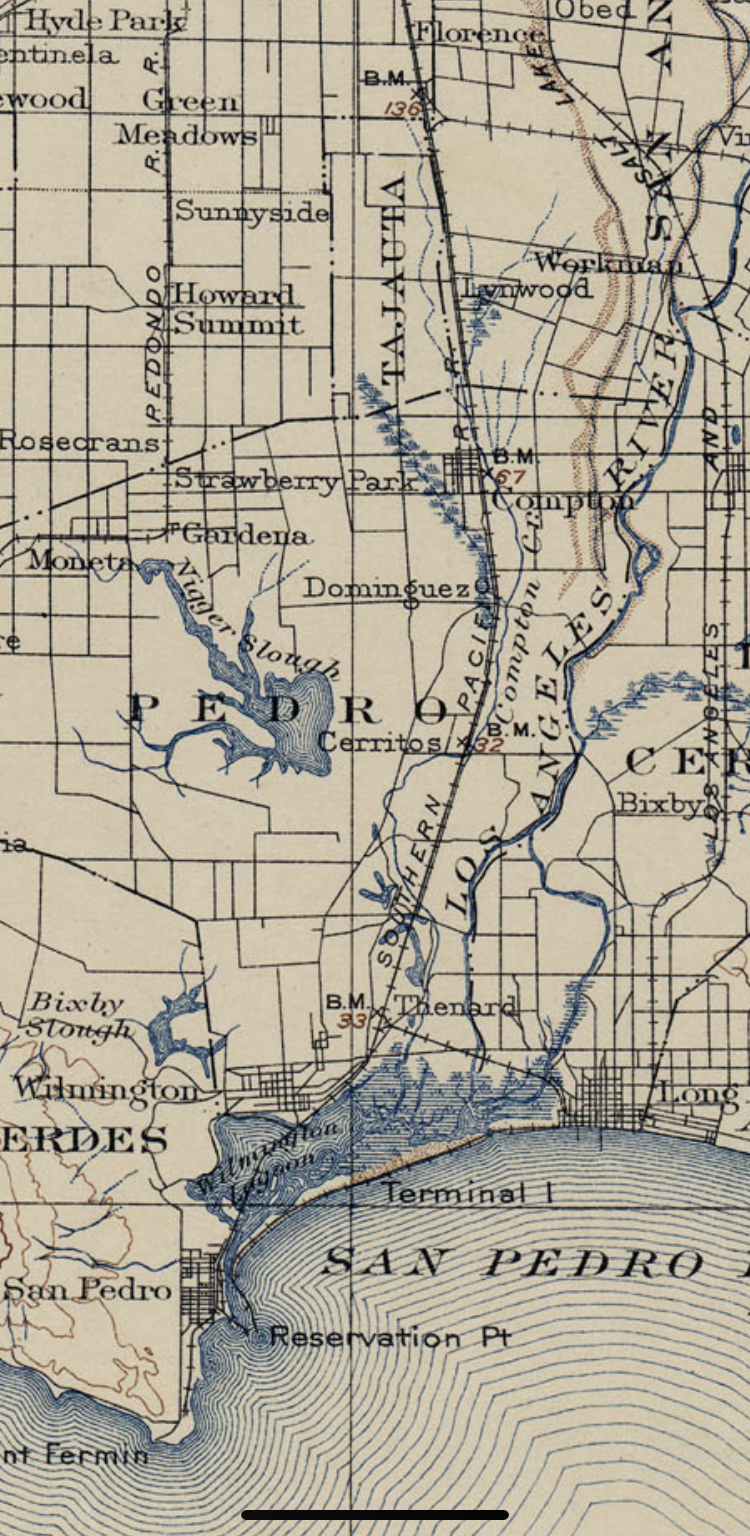
Sloughs and rivers of San Pedro Bay, 1900 (note that prior name of Dominguez Slough incorporated a racial epithet; Bixby Slough is bottom left)

== See also ==
- Wetland conservation
- Wilmington Oil Field
- Bixby Marshland
- Ballona Wetlands
- Los Cerritos Wetlands
- Madrona Marsh
- Gardena Willows Wetland
- Seal Beach National Wildlife Refuge
- Tijuana Slough National Wildlife Refuge
