= Bixby Marshland =

Wildlife habitat in Los Angeles Harbor Region, California

Coordinates: 33°48′24″N 118°17′08″W

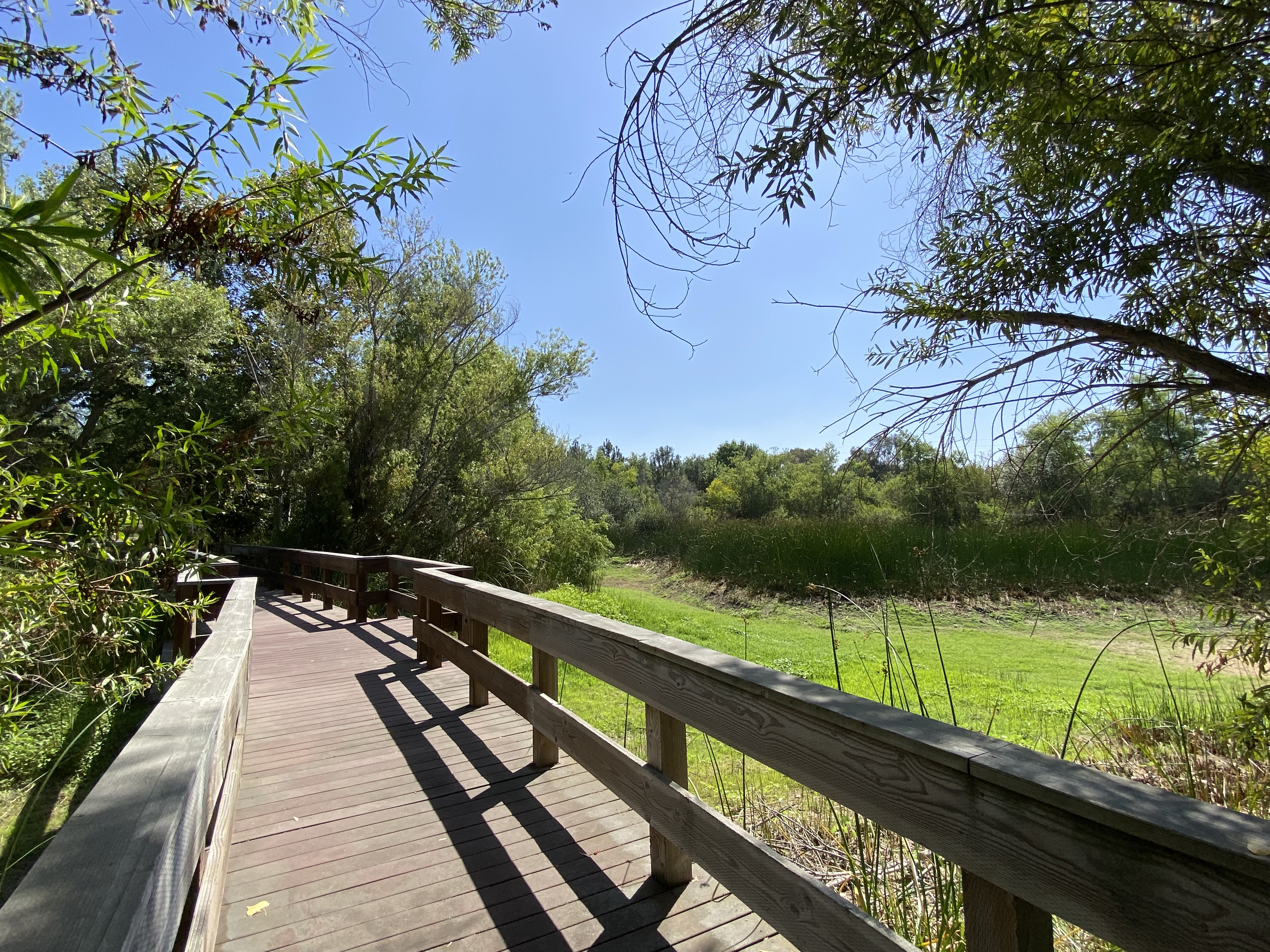
Bixby Marshland boardwalk in dry season

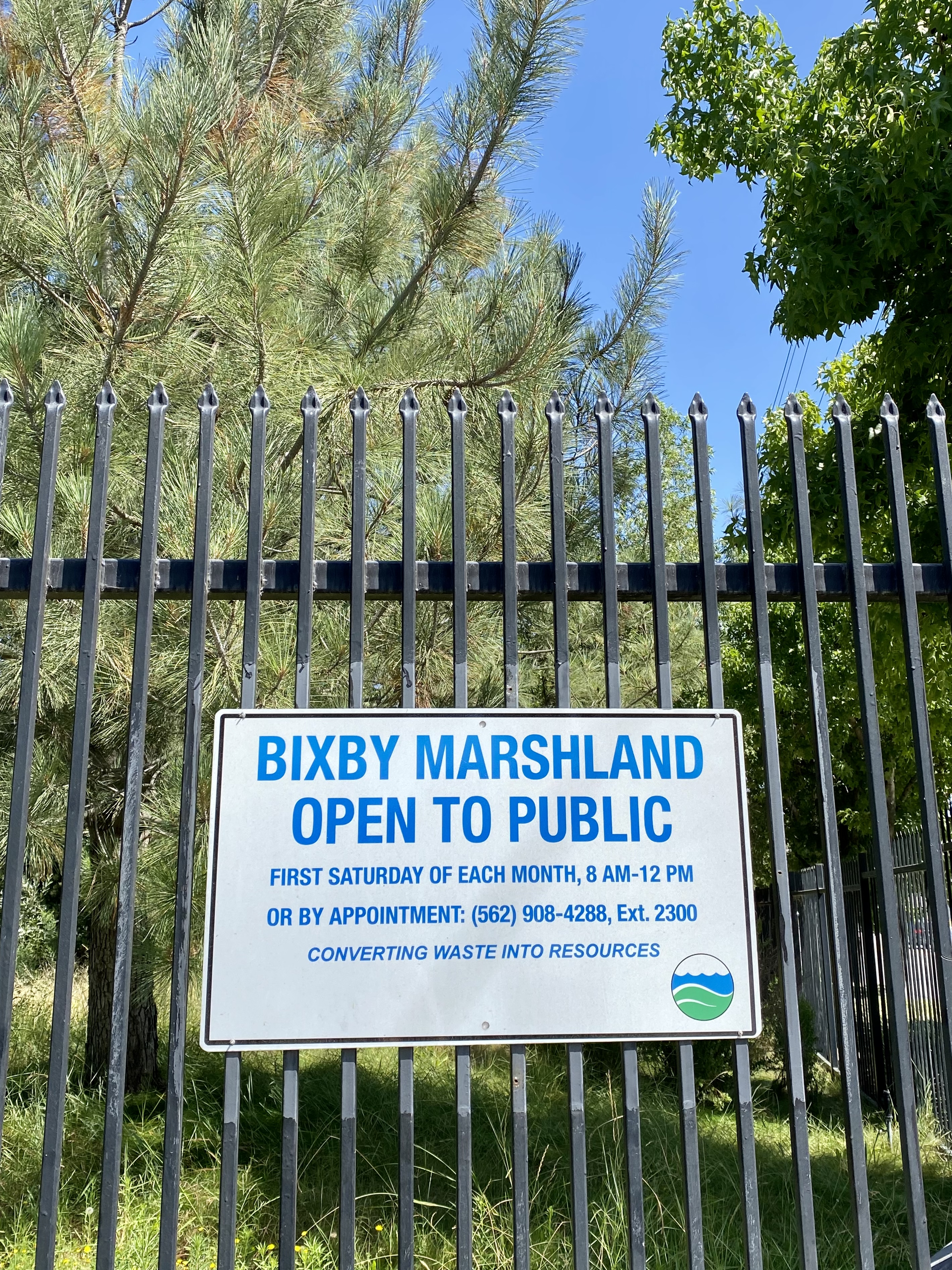
Bixby Marshland gate sign

Bixby Marshland is a Delta wildlife area operated by the Los Angeles County Sanitation Districts in Carson, California, as part of the environmental mitigation of wastewater.

The space is 17 acres (6.9 ha) in area and is a restoration of the old Bixby Slough. The only other surviving piece of the Slough is Machado Lake at Ken Malloy Harbor Regional Park. Bixby Marsh is notable as a “unique marsh habitat in an urban setting.” According to the Bixby Marshland Guide for Visitors, the Sanitation District and Los Angeles County Department of Public Works secured the land in mid-1970s, but "over time, non-native plants proliferated at the site." To restore the marshland so that it was closer to its original ecological state, many introduced species were removed, and others like eucalyptus were killed but left standing as snags, which are important habitat resources. A "large variety of native plants" was selected to re-vegetate the area.

It is located next to the 110 freeway and the adjacent Wilmington Wash flood control channel at the southwest corner of Figueroa Street and Sepulveda Boulevard.

Established in 2009, the park is open to the public for tours on the first Saturday of each month from 8 a.m. to noon (weather permitting) and by appointment.

== See also ==
- Los Cerritos Wetlands
- Ballona Wetlands
- Madrona Marsh
