= Los Cerritos Wetlands =

Wetland between Los Angeles and Orange Counties, California, USA

Coordinates: 33°45′43″N 118°6′30″W

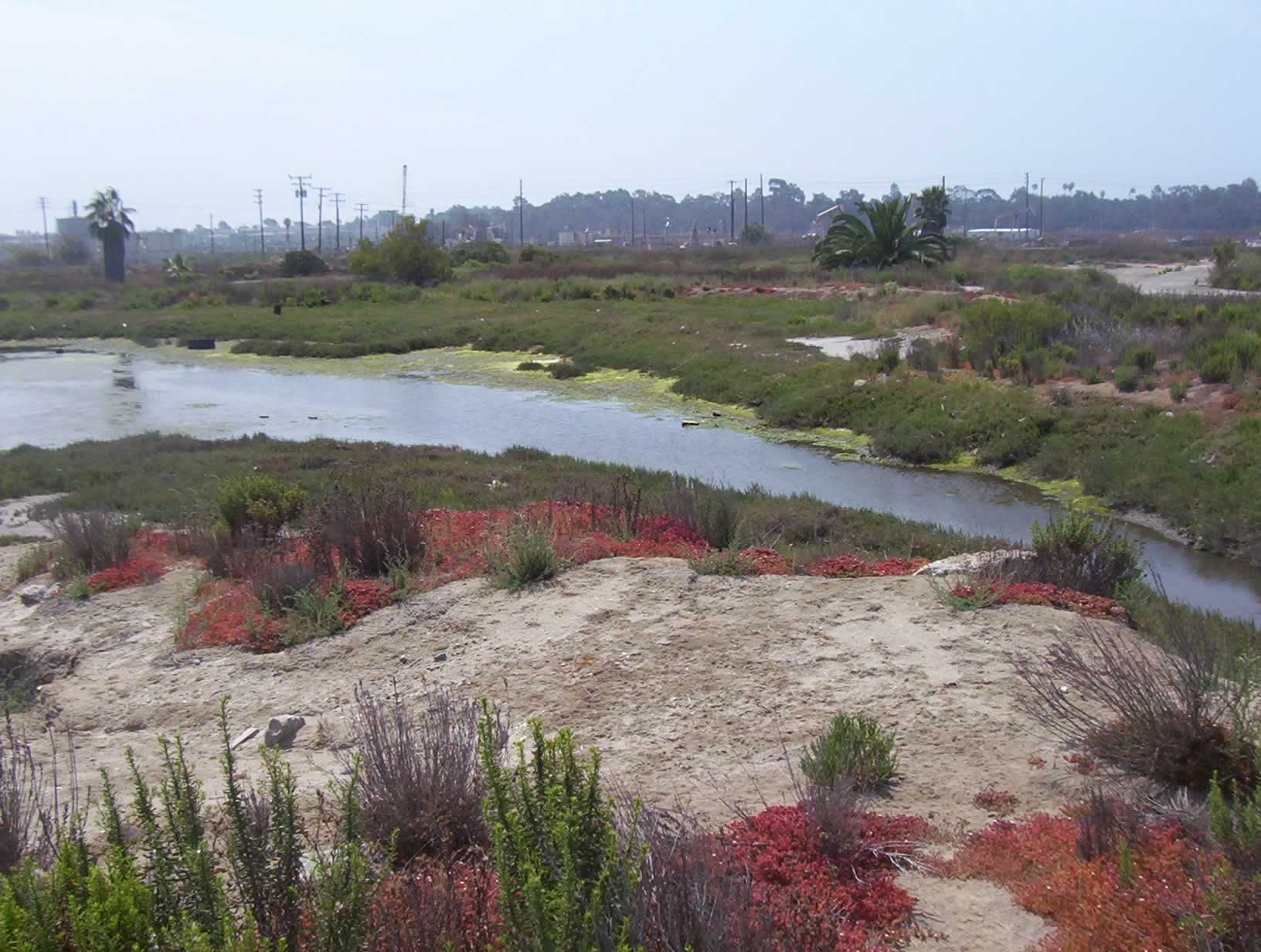
Los Cerritos Wetlands, Zedler Marsh

Los Cerritos Wetlands is located in both Los Angeles County and Orange County in the cities of Long Beach, California, and Seal Beach, California. The San Gabriel River, historically and currently flows through the Los Cerritos Wetlands Complex.

Los Cerritos Wetlands is very close to the Pacific Ocean with waters at high tides bringing shallow ocean water over portions of the marshland. Some portions of Los Cerritos Wetlands are fed by winter rainfall creating ephemeral pools.

Once a vast marsh covering approximately 2,400 acres (971 ha), Los Cerritos Wetland are now smaller but still maintain ecological function and ecosystem processes. They were historically the wetlands of Puvunga.

== Environment and wildlife ==
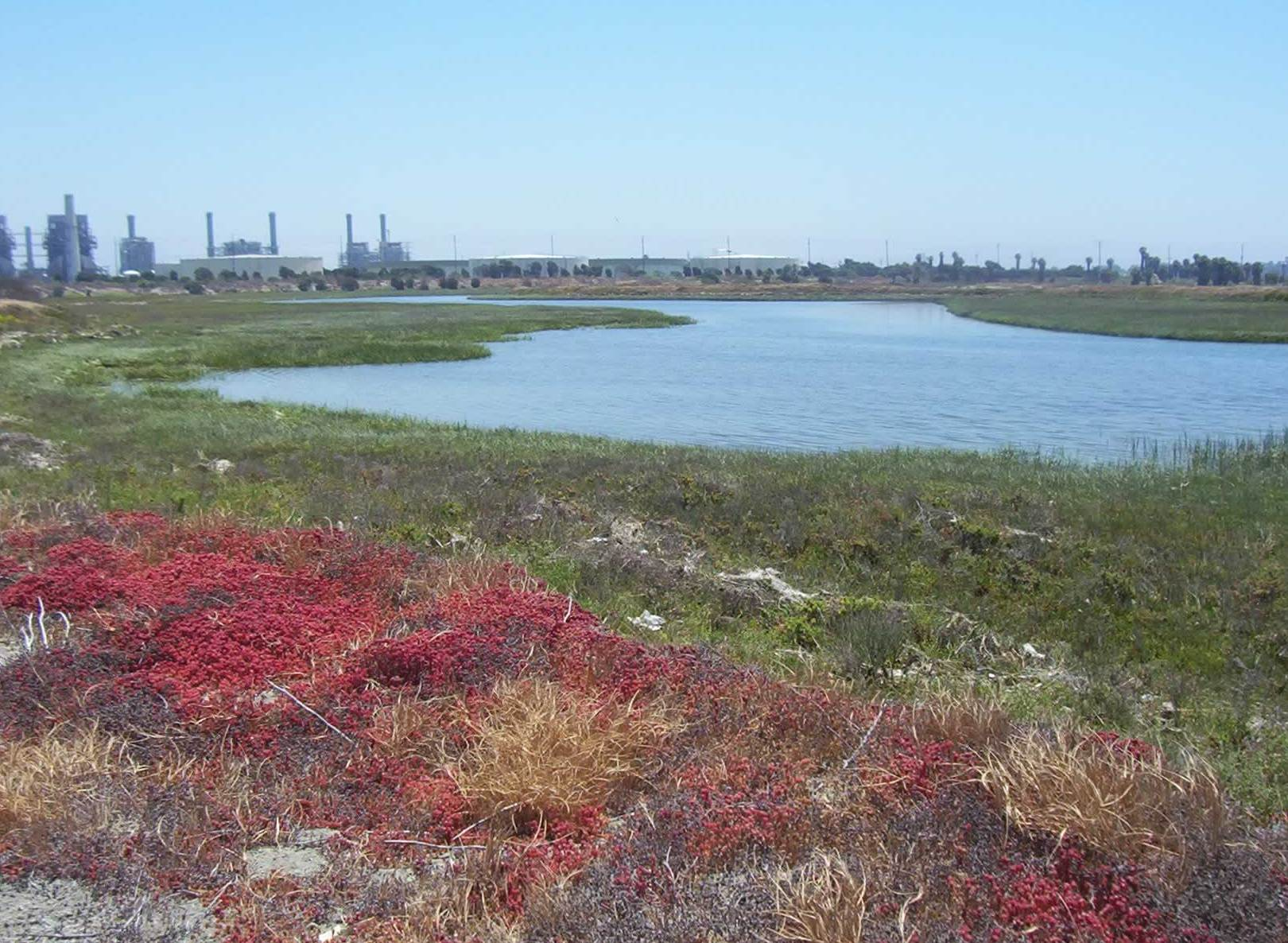
Los Cerritos Wetlands, Steamshovel Slough

Los Cerritos Wetlands consists of two functioning marshes (Steamshovel Slough and Zedler Marsh), plus a number of seasonal brackish ponds, all with an abundance of wildlife. The Zedler Marsh portion of the wetlands have multiple plant communities: adjacent uplands, coastal sage scrub, alkaline grasslands, willow/mulefat thicket, and salt marsh. They are home to several endangered species, including the Belding's Savannah sparrow, California least tern, California brown pelican, wandering skipper, and the tiger beetle.

The Salicornia pacifica is where the endangered Savannah Sparrow nests, making it an essential plant species. In 2010, a survey done by the state of California found that there were hatchlings in Monanthochloe littorali at the Los Cerritos Wetlands. To name some other dominant plants there are the Distichilis spicata, Baccharis salicifolia, Frankenia salina, Jaumea carnosa, and Batis Maritima. A number of special status species protected under other acts also inhabit the wetlands, like the Centromadia parryi ssp. australis, as well as many common plants and animals typical of a California coastal salt marsh habitat.

Most of the remaining open space, once a thriving wetlands consisting of tidal salt marshes, lagoons, bays and alkali meadows where the San Gabriel River flows into the Pacific Ocean, is currently privately owned and used for oil operations. With climate change and its impacts becoming more prevalent, the phenology at Los Cerritos Wetlands has started to become disrupted. Rising sea levels related to climate change threatens to drown the marsh and wetland forever. This will be exacerbated if levees are removed to allow additional seawater to enter this ecosystem. Increased salt water can change the dynamic of the wetlands. Overall, every aspect of the marsh can reflect the effects of climate change. More than 90% of California wetlands have been destroyed due to urbanization, agriculture, and manipulation of local watersheds. Any remaining wetland is considered to be threatened because of all these factors. There is a lack of viable wetlands that can support native and migrating fauna. This is why a coalition of public and private entities are working together to protect, purchase, and restore the remaining roughly 500 acres.

== Restoration project ==
The cities of Long Beach and Seal Beach, the California Coastal Conservancy, the Rivers and Mountains Conservancy several local businesses, grassroots and community groups, and citizens are working to protect, purchase and restore the remaining acreage of the Los Cerritos Wetlands.

172 acres (0.70 km^{2}) of land has been acquired by the Los Cerritos Wetlands Authority; a total of 255.67 acres (1.0347 km^{2}) within the wetland boundaries are now public lands. The official community-based restoration “kick off” began September 19, 2009, with the Los Cerritos Wetlands Stewardship Program’s Zedler Marsh Cleanup Day event. Regular habitat restoration days have since been held. A final conceptual restoration plan for the entire Los Cerritos Wetlands complex was completed August 2015.

In September 2023, Los Cerritos Wetlands Authority revealed its plans to restore 54 acres of the south side of the wetlands. This will be the first phase of their goal to restore and provide public access to 103.5 acres in total out of the available 503 acres. LCWA received a $31.8 million grant from the California State Coastal Conservancy to fund the restoration. Flood management, removing invasive species, reconnecting the wetlands to the tidal flow, planting native vegetation, and providing public access with new paths will be the main focus. The starting date for this project is estimated to be around Fall 2025.

== Environmental Impact Report ==
The Los Cerritos Wetlands Authority (LCWA) has certified the Final Environmental Impact Report (EIR) for the Los Cerritos Wetlands to continue efforts to provide a comprehensive restoration framework for the Los Cerritos Wetlands. The LCWA initiated the preparation of its EIR to determine the nature and extent of the proposed program’s impact upon the environment. An EIR also identifies ways to reduce environmental effects and analyzes reasonable alternatives to avoid or minimize significant environmental effects.

The proposed program would restore wetland, transitional, and upland habitats throughout the program area. This would involve remediation of contaminated soil, grading, revegetation, construction of new public access opportunities (including trails, visitor centers, parking lots, and viewpoints), construction of flood management facilities (including earthen levees, berms, and walls), and modification of existing infrastructure and utilities.

== See also ==
- Ballona Wetlands Ecological Preserve
- Gardena Willows Wetland Preserve
- Los Angeles River
- Madrona Marsh
- Bixby Marshland
