= Miner's inch =

Measurement unit for flow rates

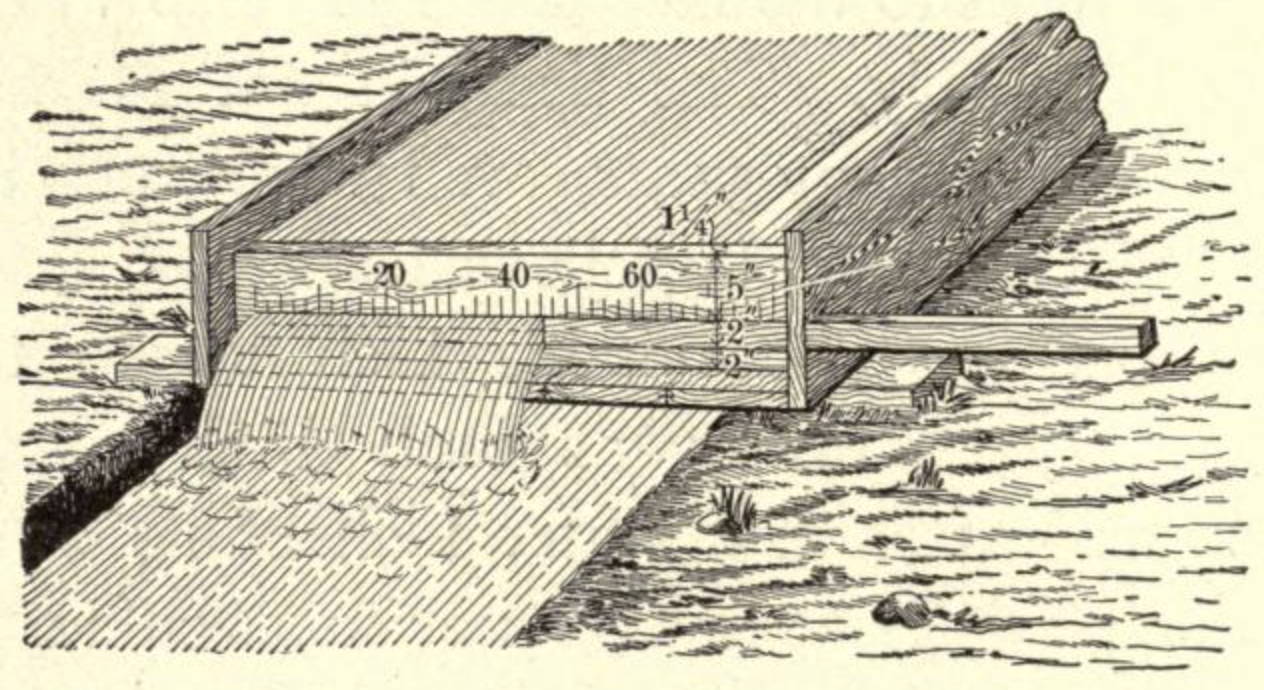
An adjustable box for measuring water flow in miner's inches

The miner's inch is a unit of flow in terms of volume per unit time, usually in relation to the flow of water. The definition of a miner's inch varies by location.

In hydraulic mining and some forms of placer mining, as well as ore dressing, a large and regular supply of water is needed. The miner's inch is a method of measuring the amount of flow a particular water supply system (such as a flume or sluice) is capable of supplying.

The miner’s inch measures the amount of water that would flow through a slot of a given area at a given pressure (for example, at a head of 6 inches of water, or 1.5 kPa.) In miner's inch the word inch refers to the area of the slot in square inches, while the pressure in inches of water refers to the height of water above the slot. A variable-width slot can be used to modify the flow rate.

== Definition ==
Historically, the unit lacked a firm definition or equivalent measurement, and varied by location, leading to confusion within the mining industry. In 1905, its usage in California was standardized. Today, standards vary across jurisdictions, with values between 1/60 and 1/36 cu ft/s.

Definition of a miner's inch
jurisdiction		definition	
New Zealand		1/60 cu ft/s	472 mL/s
United States	California (south); Idaho; Kansas; Nebraska; New Mexico; North Dakota; South Dakota; Utah; Washington	1/50 cu ft/s	566 mL/s
United States	Arizona; California (north); Montana; Nevada; Oregon	1/40 cu ft/s	708 mL/s
United States	Colorado	1/38 cu ft/s	745 mL/s
Canada	British Columbia	1/36 cu ft/s	787 mL/s

State regulations sometimes forbid the use of the unit without it being associated with a definition in the same document.
