= Ken Malloy Harbor Regional Park =

Municipal park in California, US

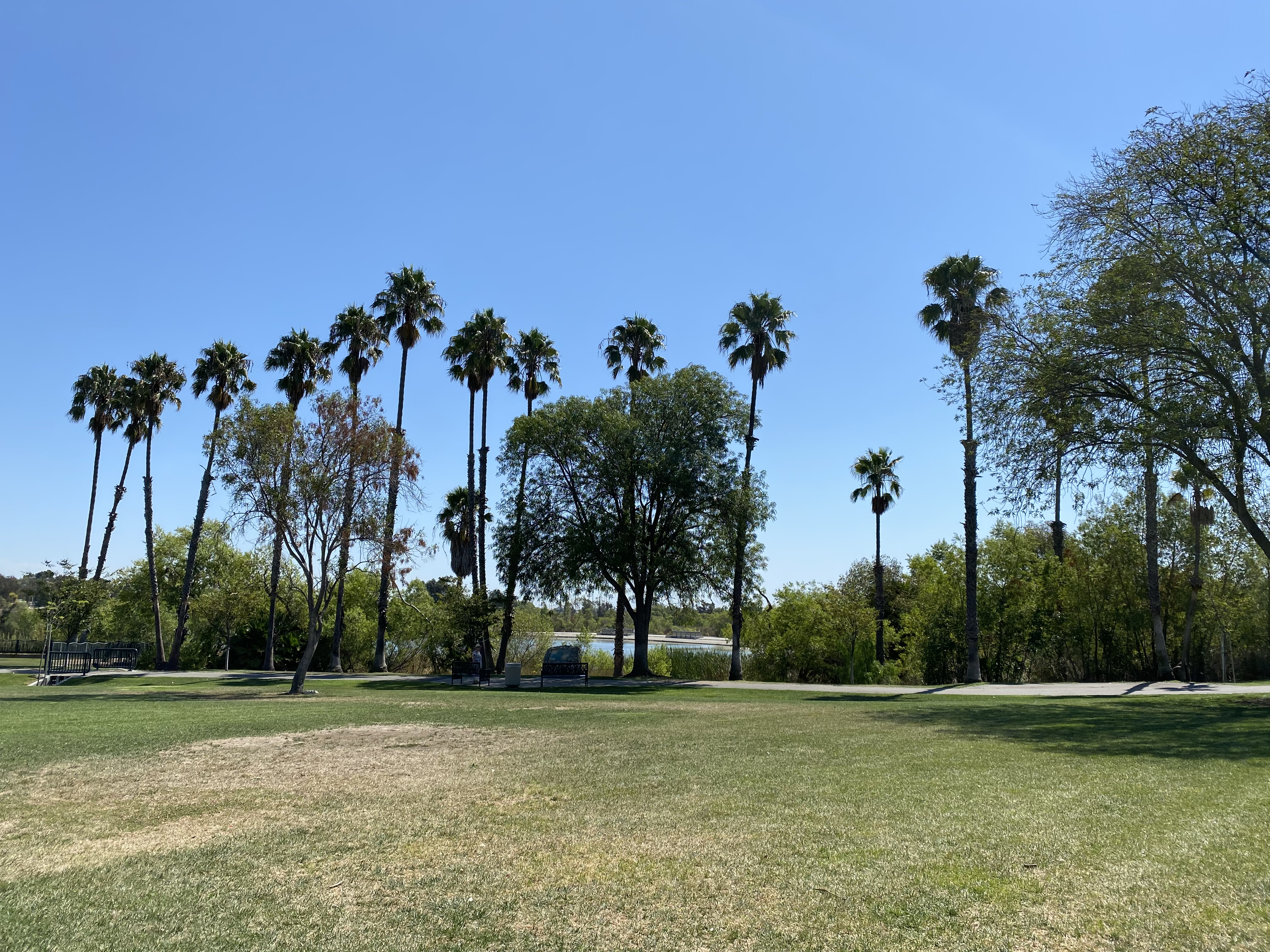
- Interactive map of Ken Malloy Harbor Regional Park
- Location: 25820 Vermont Ave., Harbor City, CA 90710
- Coordinates: 33°47′06″N 118°17′33″W
- Established: 1971

Ken Malloy Harbor Regional Park, commonly Harbor Park, is a 231-acre (0.93 km^{2}) Los Angeles municipal park featuring a golf course and 45-acre (0.18 km^{2}) Machado Lake and freshwater bayou wetland.

Harbor Park is located west of Harbor Freeway and south of Pacific Coast Highway, adjacent to Los Angeles Harbor College.

In addition to the lake and golf course, amenities include barbecue pits and picnic tables, children's playgrounds, a bike path and walking trail, and an outdoor fitness zone.

The park is visited by migratory birds and is a "dedicated city wildlife sanctuary." More than 160 species of birds have been observed in the park since it reopened in 2017 after a rehab, and it's "one of the best places in the South Bay" to see the "secretive" marsh wren. The historic pre-development bird list for the park land is significantly longer. However, the park's wetland habitat is periodically disrupted by litter and debris flows from city storm drains. The park is a "natural low point, collecting water from a 9,000-acre (36 km^{2}) watershed."

The refurbishment completed in 2017 included "pathways, four observation piers, two observation zones, two pedestrian bridges, interpretive signs, new park fixtures, 622 new park trees, and over 50,000 new plants."

Prior to the improvements "alien species and pollution [were] serious problems at the park." Circa 2011, problematic invasive species with breeding populations within the park included "bullfrogs, apple snails as big as baseballs and Florida banded water snakes."

The infamous alligator Reggie lived at the park for two years from 2005 to 2007 until he was finally captured and relocated to the Los Angeles Zoo. (The two-year hunt for Reggie "astoundingly...netted another, smaller alligator.")

As of 2014, Lake Machado was described as "a state-designated 'impaired water body' because of its witch's brew of trash, algae, coliform bacteria, foul odors and hazardous substances. Adjacent habitat is strewn with broken glass. Interlopers wage paintball wars and drive vehicles through the nesting and foraging grounds of more than 300 species of birds. The park has only one working restroom and no security. Brush fires are annual events."

Prior to 2002, "Boating and fishing were originally allowed in the Lake, and until recently fish were stocked in the Lake. As water quality deteriorated and toxic sediment accumulated, boating was stopped and signs have been posted with warnings about the risk of eating fish from the Lake."

"Mosquitoes have been a chronic problem that has been exacerbated by flourishing tule growth in the accumulated sediments along the east shore," noted a report in the Proceedings of the Water Environment Federation. Encephalitis-bearing mosquitoes were found in the park at one point and a caged flock of hens was placed in the park to use for mosquito testing. (Mosquitoes apparently prefer to feast on poultry before primate when given a choice.)

== Harbor Regional Park bicycle loop ==
The bicycle loop is 5.5 miles (8.9 km) long if you include Harbor College, and 4.5 mi (7.2 km) if you bypass it. "Note that there is a separate bike/walk access to the park. Just east of Gaffey Street at the intersection is a path which travels under Anaheim Street and enters at an undeveloped area near the southwest end of the park."

== Golf course ==
Harbor Park has a nine-hole par-36 golf course with views of Machado Lake that has been called a "neighborhood highlight."

The golf course was the first part of the new park to be built after the draining of Bixby Slough. The course was opened with a celebratory golf tournament on October 12, 1958. A driving range and a clubhouse "in the contemporary Spanish California style" was opened in 1973. Circa 1991, the Harbor Lake course was the second-busiest golf course in the Los Angeles City golf course system after Rancho Park Golf Course, which has 18 holes.

== See also ==
- List of parks in Los Angeles
- Bixby Slough
- Bixby Marshland
