= Madrona Marsh =

Vernal freshwater marsh in Southern California, USA

Coordinates: 33°49′37″N 118°20′33″W

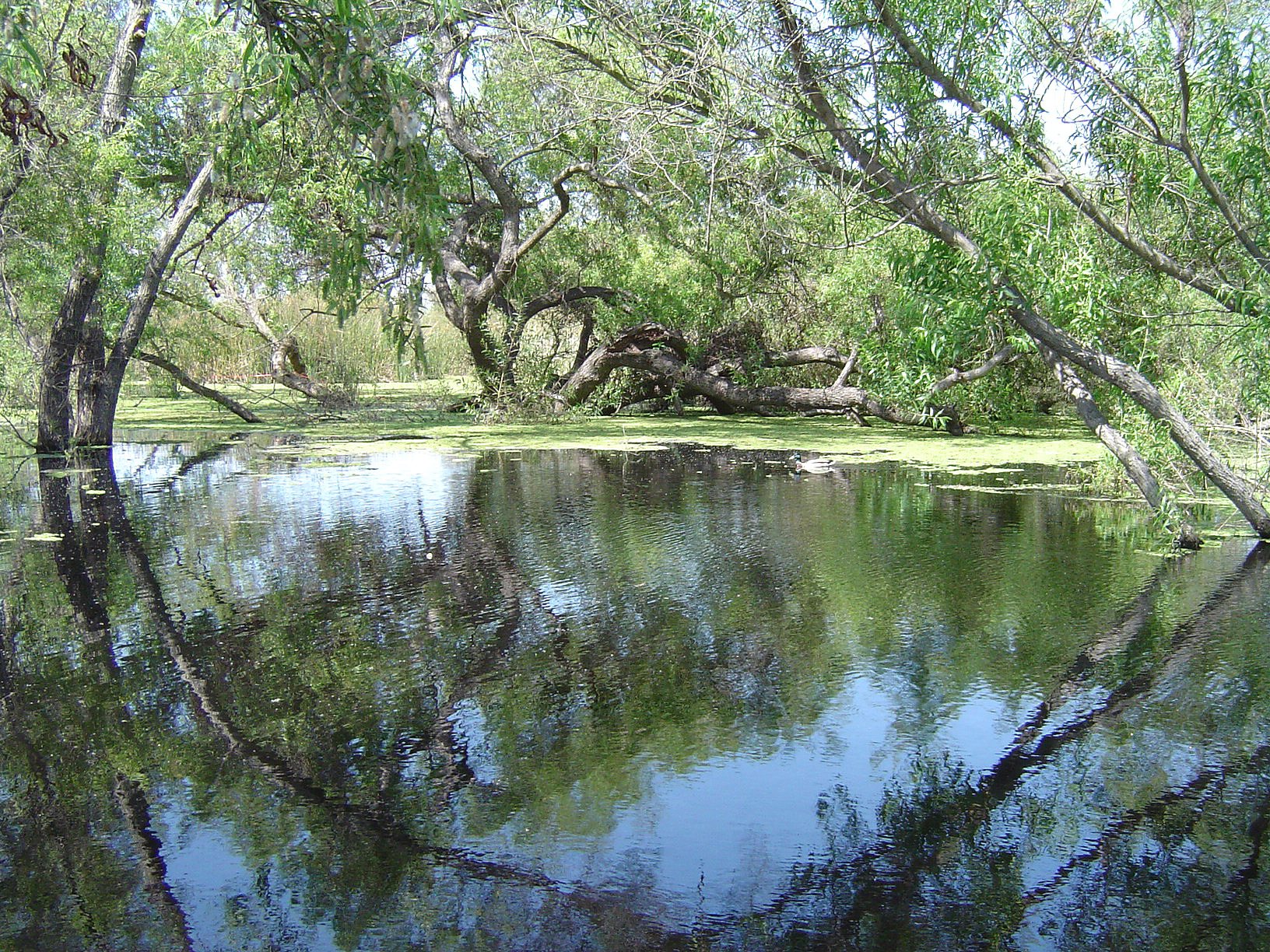
Madrona Marsh in spring

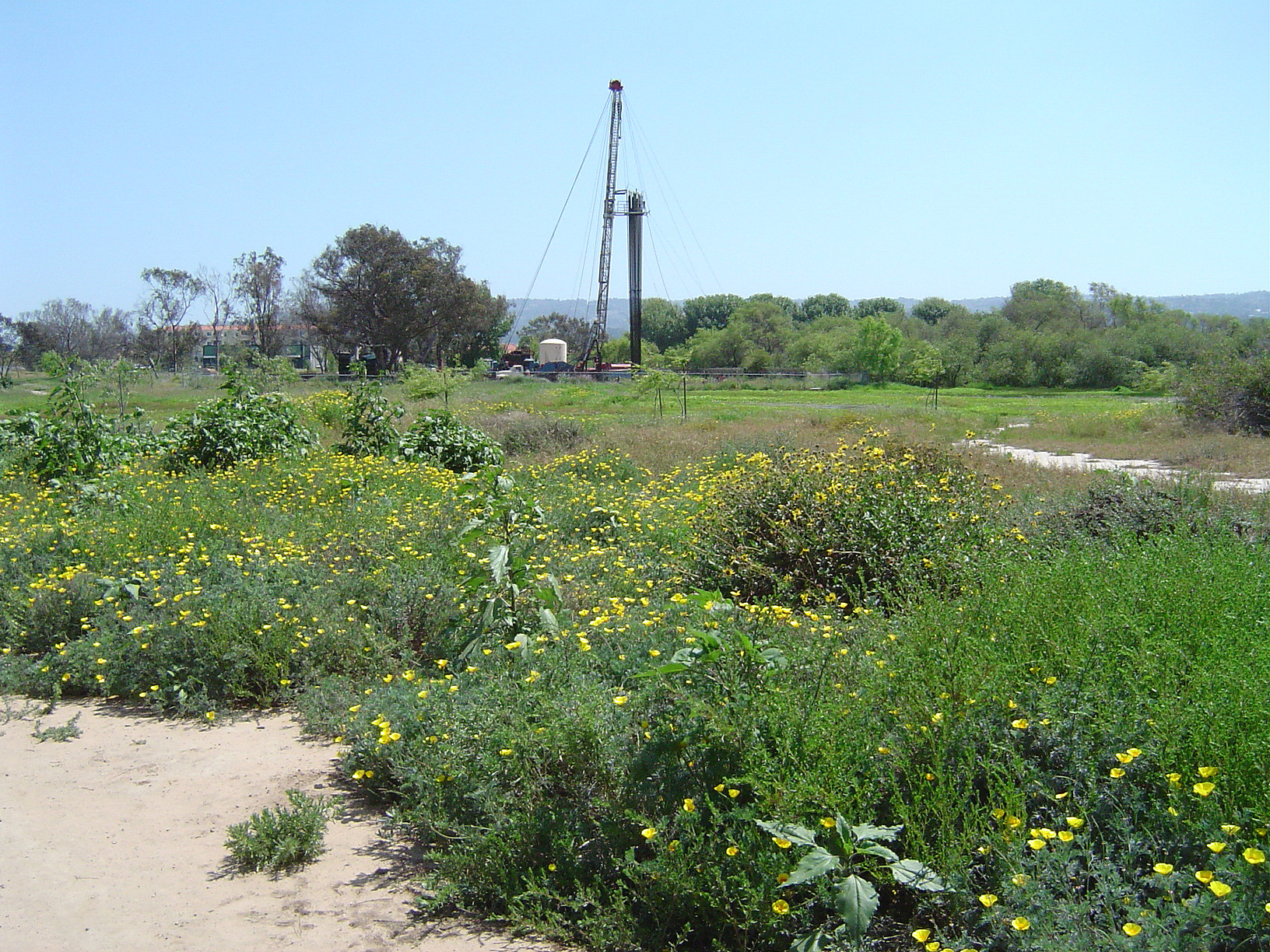
Drilling rig in Madrona Marsh

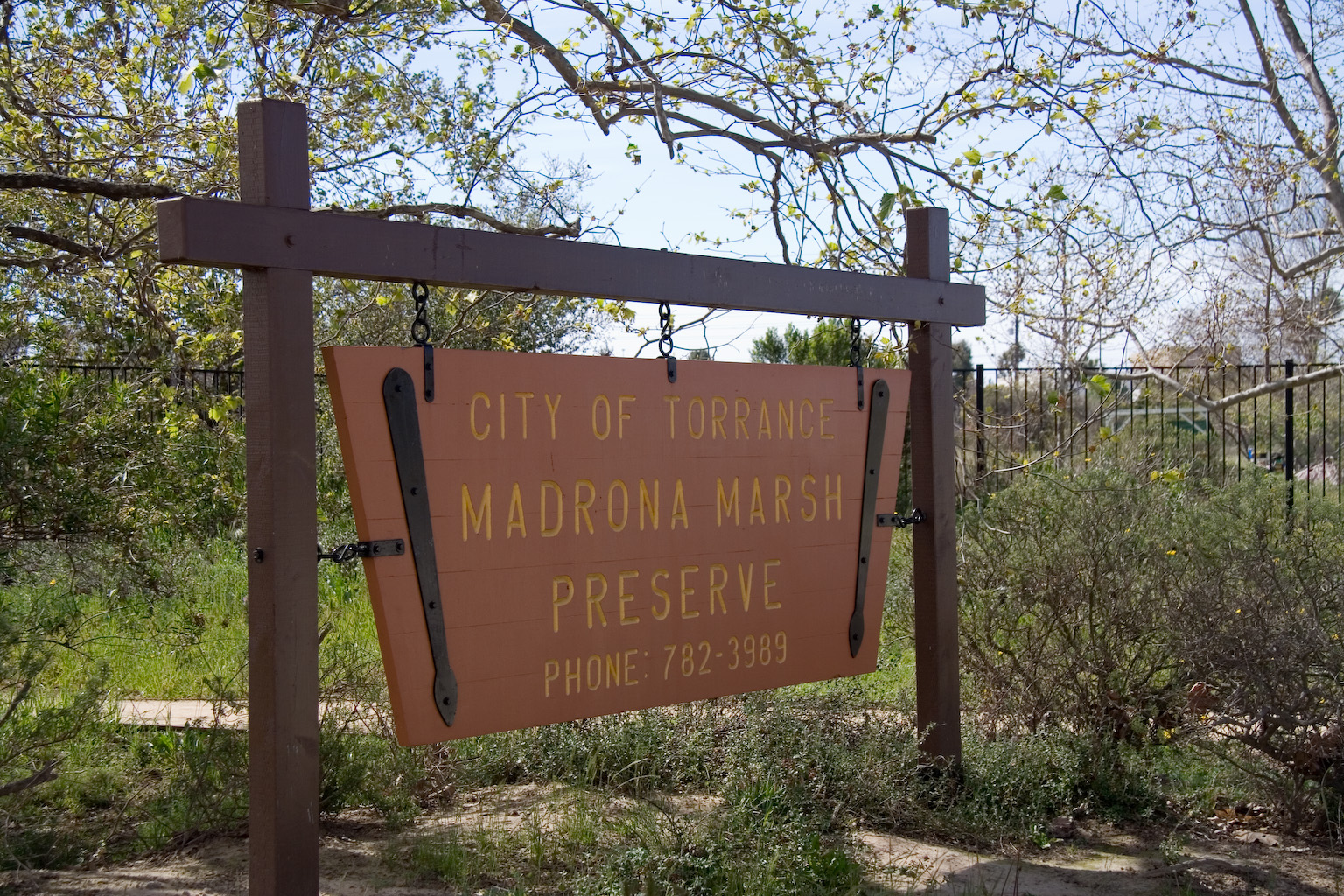
Entrance sign

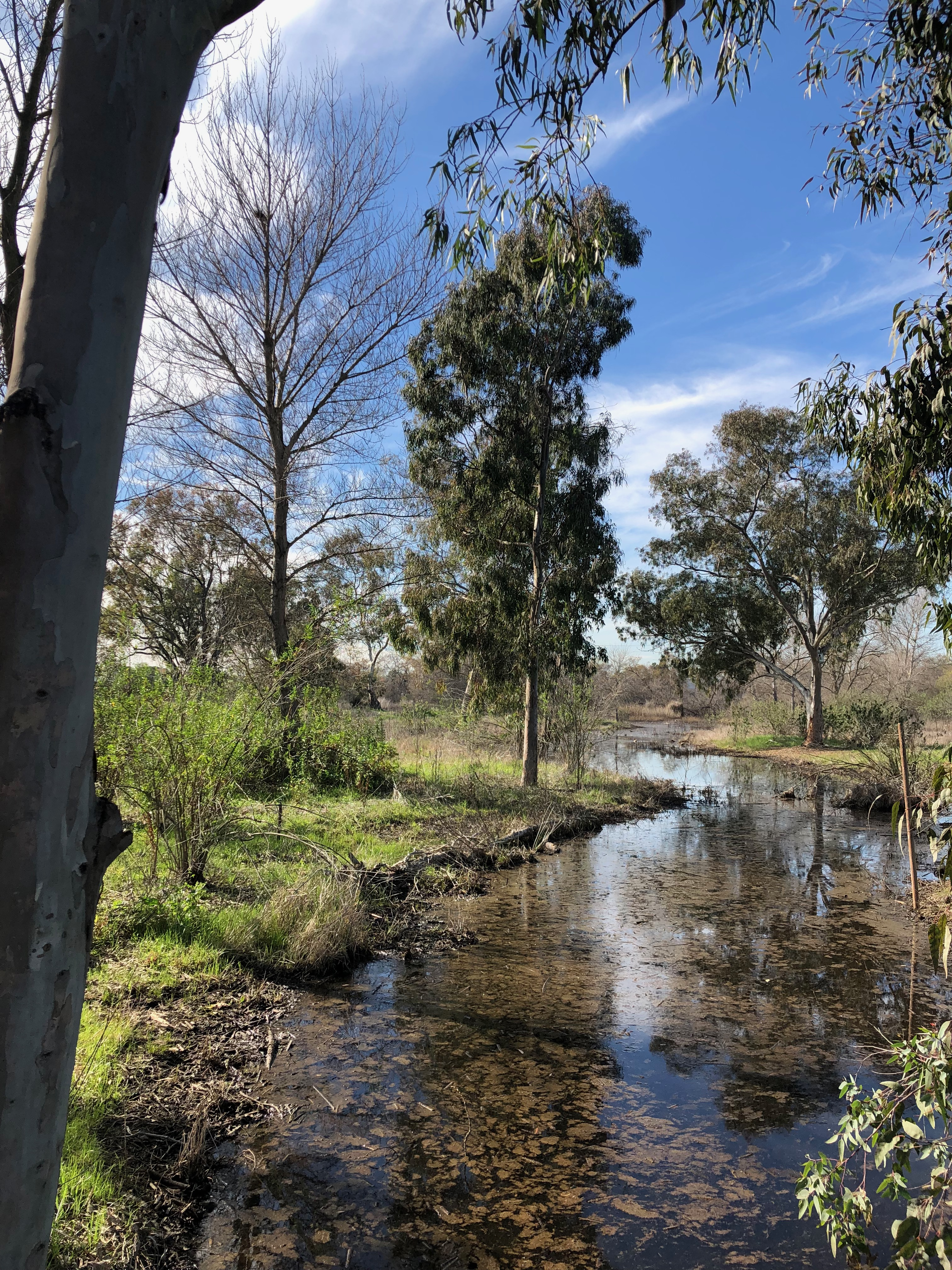
View of pond and trees in Madrona Marsh.

The Madrona Marsh Preserve, in the city of Torrance in the South Bay region of Southern California, is a seasonal Delta wetland with vernal pools. The 43 acres (17 ha) was a former site of oil wells and is one of the few natural areas remaining within an urban landscape.

Formed eons ago when the mountains of the Palos Verdes Peninsula rose to the south, Madrona Marsh is a shallow depression fed by wet season (spring) storms as the name "vernal" indicates. After the rainy season, evaporation, percolation and transpiration reduce the water depth by about one-quarter of an inch (6 mm) per day. By the end of August, the wetland is dry and remains so until the following rainy season. Situated on land that was set aside for oil production in 1924, Madrona Marsh was never developed while the city grew up around the site and remains a valuable natural habitat for birds, reptiles, insects and small mammals.

Ongoing efforts are restoring native plants including wildflowers. Plantings may benefit local butterfly species including the Palos Verdes blue. The area has long been popular with bird watchers and The Audubon Society has used Madrona Marsh for their annual bird census since 1967. El Camino College uses it as an outdoor biology and botany lab.

The Madrona Marsh Nature Center is operated by the City of Torrance in cooperation with the Friends of the Madrona Marsh. Activities include bird and nature walks, natural history classes and workshops, habitat restoration, science and astronomy programs, art exhibits, and children's nature programs. The center opened in 2001 and features exhibits about the plants, birds and animals of the marsh. The nature center for the Preserve is across the street.

== See also ==
- Ballona Wetlands Ecological Preserve
- Gardena Willows Wetland Preserve
- Los Cerritos Wetlands
- Bixby Marshland
