= Belmont Park, Long Beach, California =

Belmont Park, California
- Neighborhood of Long Beach
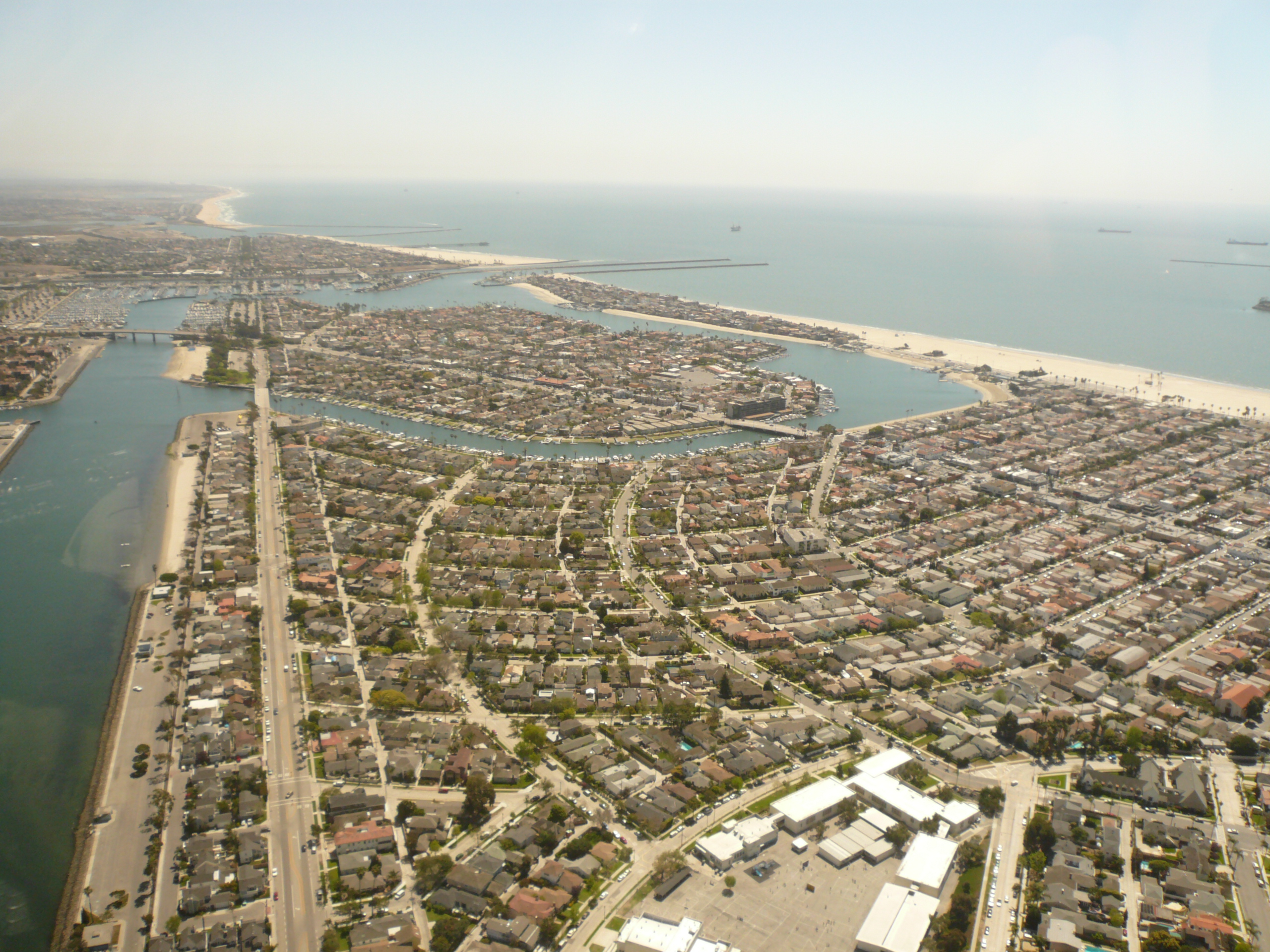
- Belmont Park is in the foreground in this photo, with Naples Island is in the middle distance, and The Peninsula and the neighboring city of Seal Beach beyond, looking southeast.
- Country: United States
- State: California
- County: Los Angeles
- City: Long Beach

Belmont Park is a neighborhood in the city of Long Beach, California.

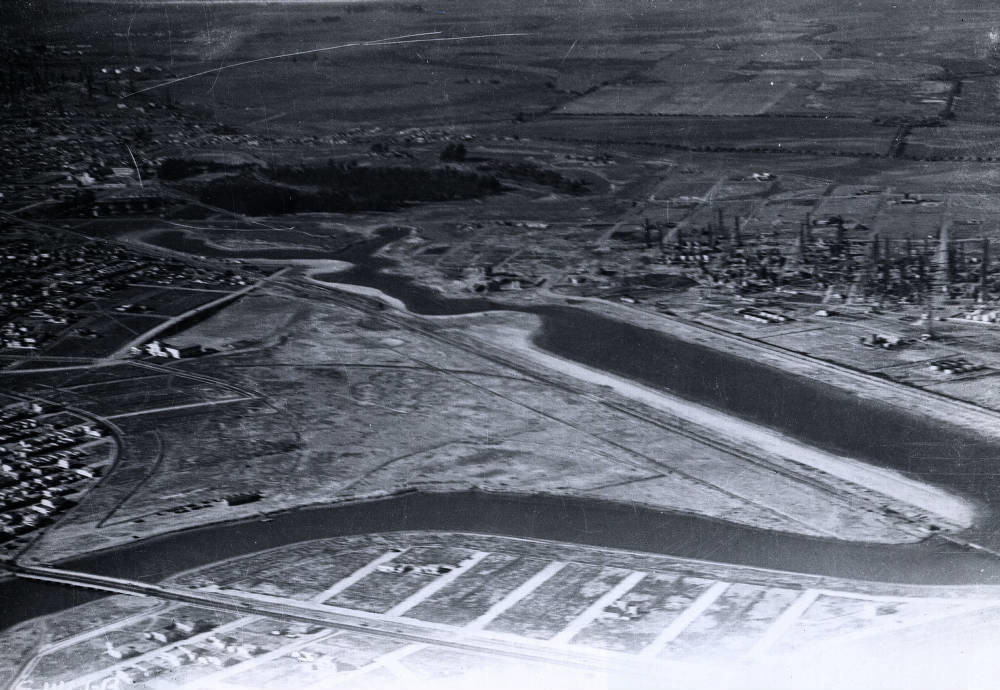
Southeast Long Beach looking northwest from Naples over what would become Belmont Park and Alamitos Heights. Recreation Park, Colorado Lagoon and Rancho Los Alamitos farmland are visible. October 1929

It is located north of Belmont Shore and east of Belmont Heights, Long Beach, California. It continues the street pattern of Belmont Shore, set at an angle to the cardinal directions, with a curvilinear twist that Belmont Shore lacks. Belmont Park abuts Alamitos Bay and Long Beach Marine Stadium, with Naples across the water to the southeast.

Gov. George Deukmejian resided in the neighborhood for over 51 years.

== See also ==
- Neighborhoods of Long Beach, California
