= Alamitos Heights, Long Beach, California =

Alamitos Heights, California
- Neighborhood of Long Beach
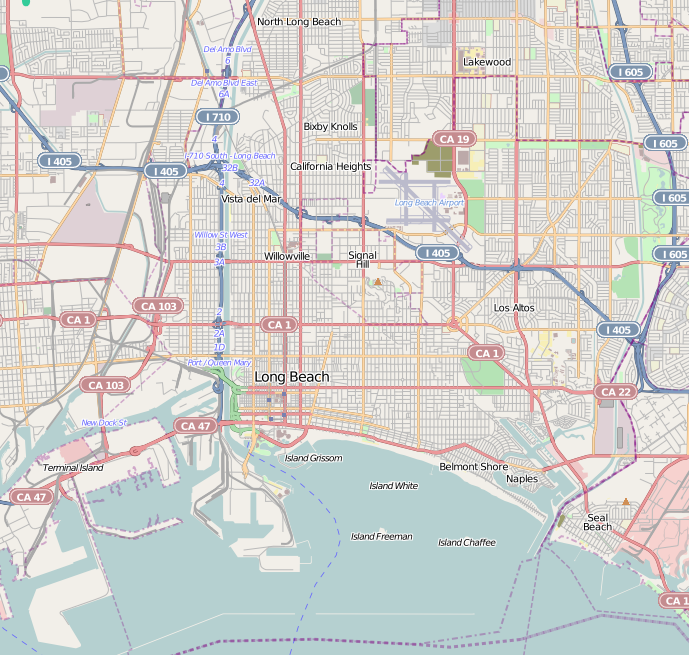
- Location in Long Beach Location in Los Angeles Metro area Location in Southern California Location in California Location in the United States
- Coordinates: 33.7726716°N 118.1254347°W
- Country: United States
- State: California
- County: Los Angeles
- City: Long Beach
- Time zone: UTC-8 (Pacific Time)
  - Summer (DST): UTC-7 (Pacific Daylight Time)

Alamitos Heights is a neighborhood in the south-east portion of the city of Long Beach, California, United States.

The neighborhood is bounded by the Pacific Coast Highway on the north, Colorado Street on the south, Park Avenue on the west, and Bellflower Boulevard on the east.

Surrounding neighborhoods include University Park Estates to the east, Park Estates to the north, and Belmont Heights to the west. Alamitos Bay is located on the south of this neighborhood, and Recreation Park is found to the west.

Alamitos Beach, several miles southwest near downtown, is not contiguous; the Alamitos Heights neighborhood gained its name from Alamitos Bay, not the beach. Colorado Lagoon is located on the neighborhood's western border.

From 1904 to 1950, the neighborhood was served by the Pacific Electric Balboa Line.

== Architecture ==
- Raphael Soriano

== See also ==
- Neighborhoods of Long Beach, California
