= Peninsula, Long Beach, California =

Coordinates: 33.7486°N 118.1223°W

Peninsula
- Neighborhood of Long Beach
- Interactive map of Peninsula
- Country: United States
- State: California
- County: Los Angeles
- City: Long Beach
- Website: lbpeninsula.org

Peninsula is a neighborhood in Long Beach, California. The landform is known as the Alamitos Peninsula. It separates Alamitos Bay from the Pacific Ocean. It is adjacent to Belmont Shore and across the water from Naples.

== History ==
In geological terms, the Alamitos Peninsula is a sandspit. Below this and many layers of sedimentary rock lies the Catalina Schist.

The first homes were built between 1902 and 1904. Around 1903, developers Strong and Dickinson and Robert March & Co. purchased and subdivided the land into 500 lots. The boardwalk was constructed around 1926. In 1929, a legal dispute (Livesey v. Stock) between two Peninsula homeowners over a fence and the high-tide line reached the Supreme Court of California. The neighborhood was severely impacted by the 1939 California tropical storm.

The Pacific Electric Long Beach-Alamitos Bay-Seal Beach Line ran along the Peninsula and across a trestle to Seal Beach, where it connected with the Balboa Line. This track was abandoned in 1940.

Sand is moved from the beach near the Belmont Veterans Memorial Pier to the Peninsula to replenish what is carried away by longshore drift. There is evidence the Long Beach Breakwater contributes to this issue by blocking the natural northwest to southeast current.

== Architecture ==
- Edward Killingsworth - home for Dr. Thomas Kiddie and his wife Mary

== Gallery ==
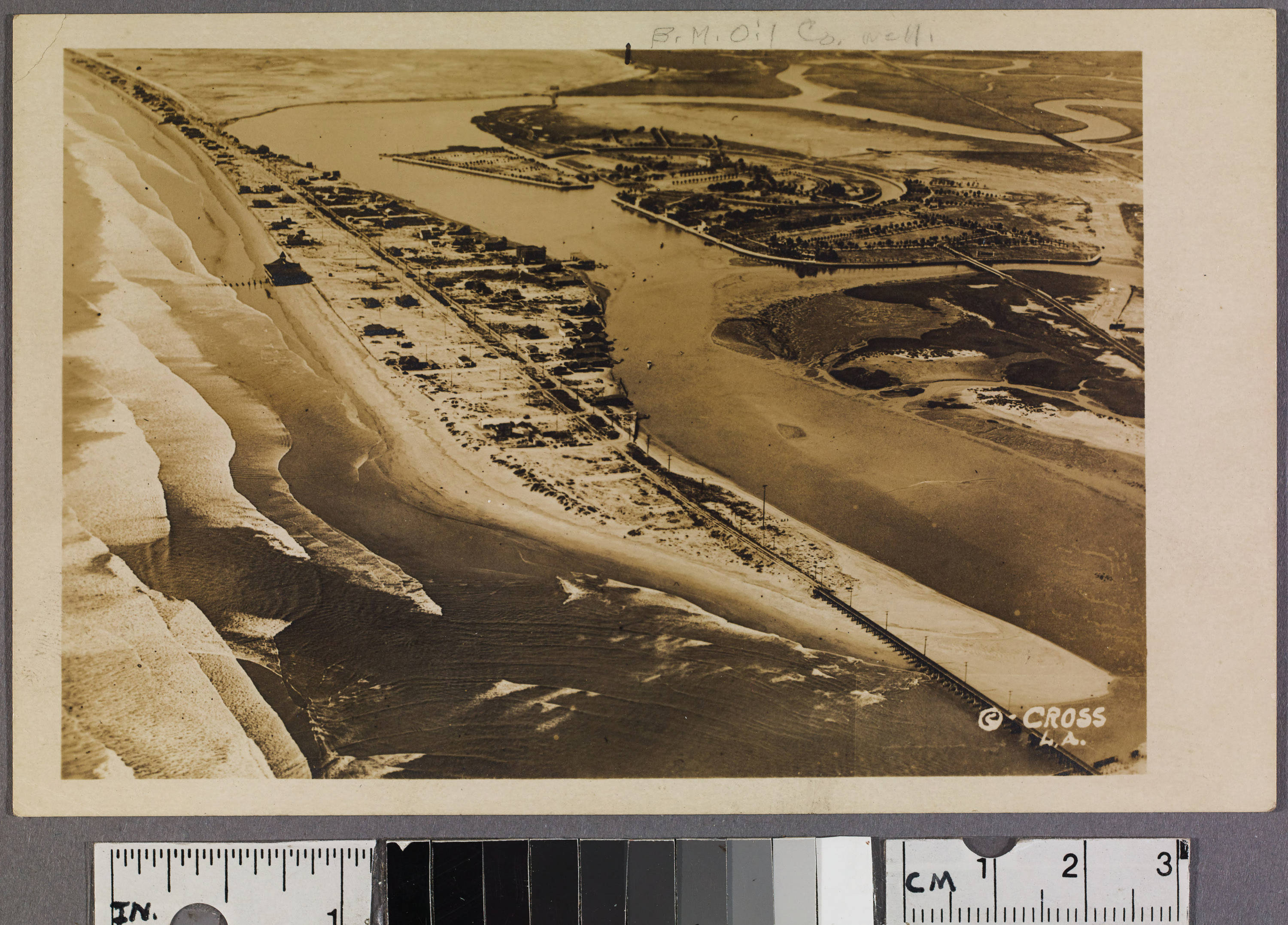
c. 1920s view of the Peninsula

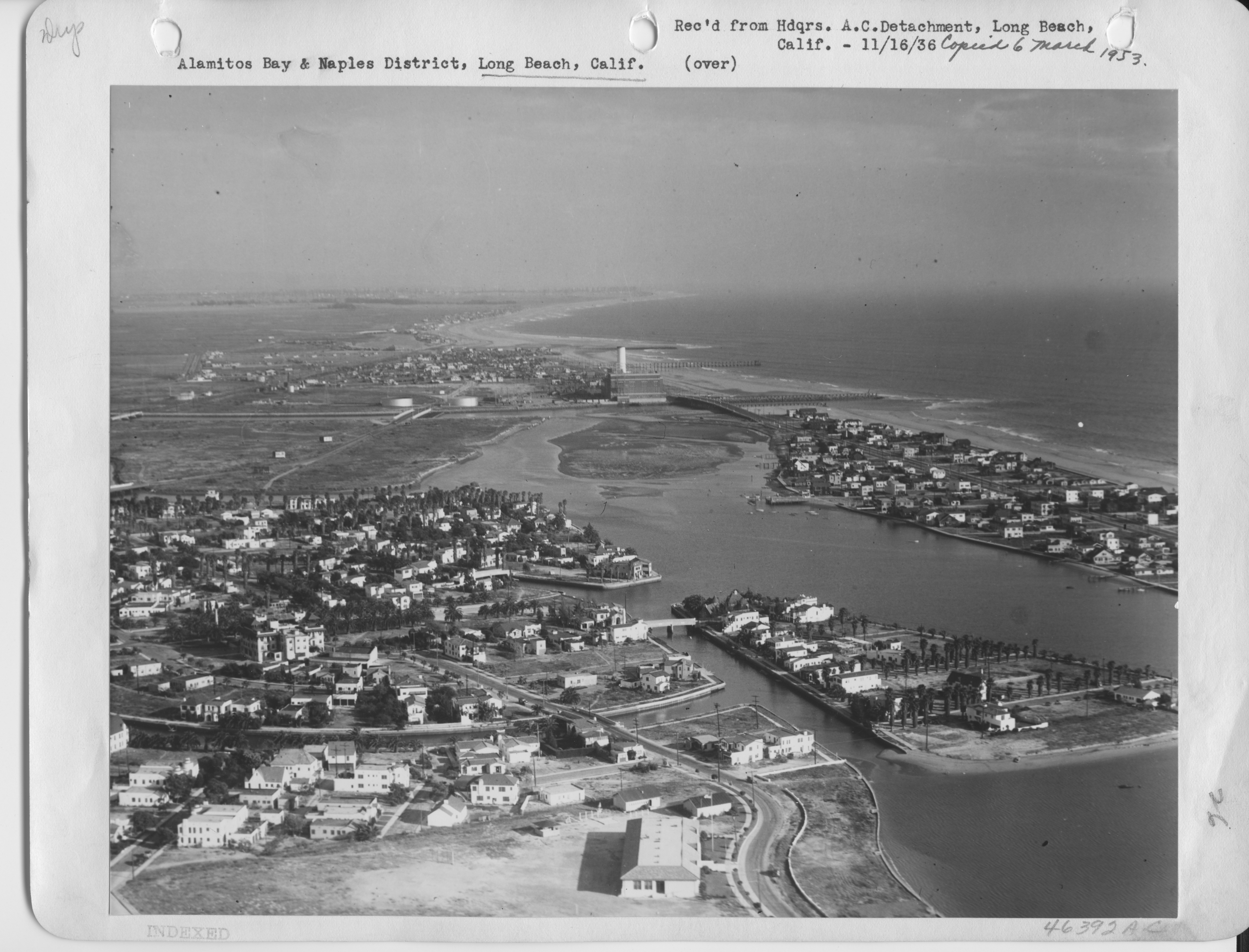
Naples, Treasure Island and the Peninsula in 1936, showing the bridge to Seal Beach

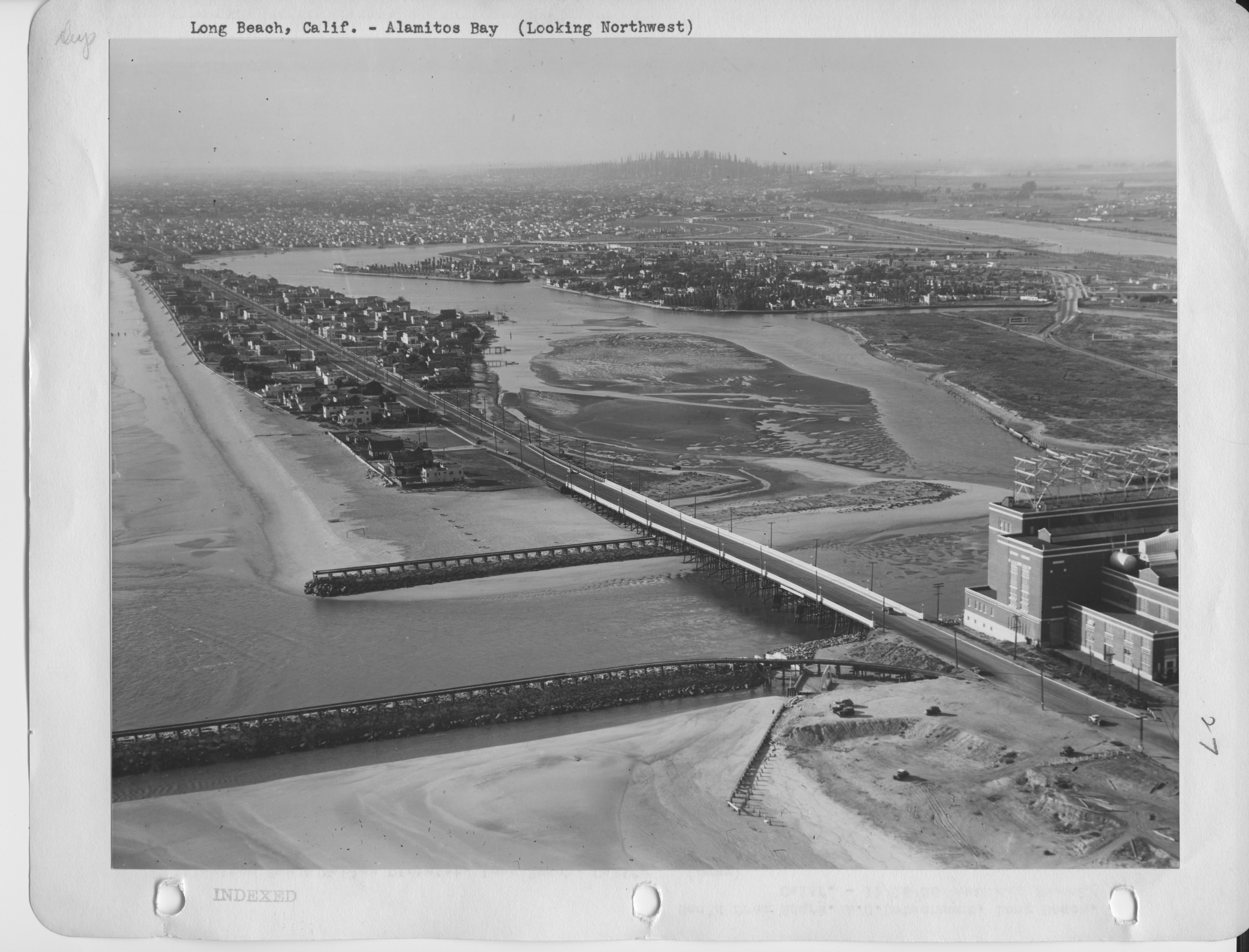
The Peninsula and the San Gabriel River, circa 1941-1947

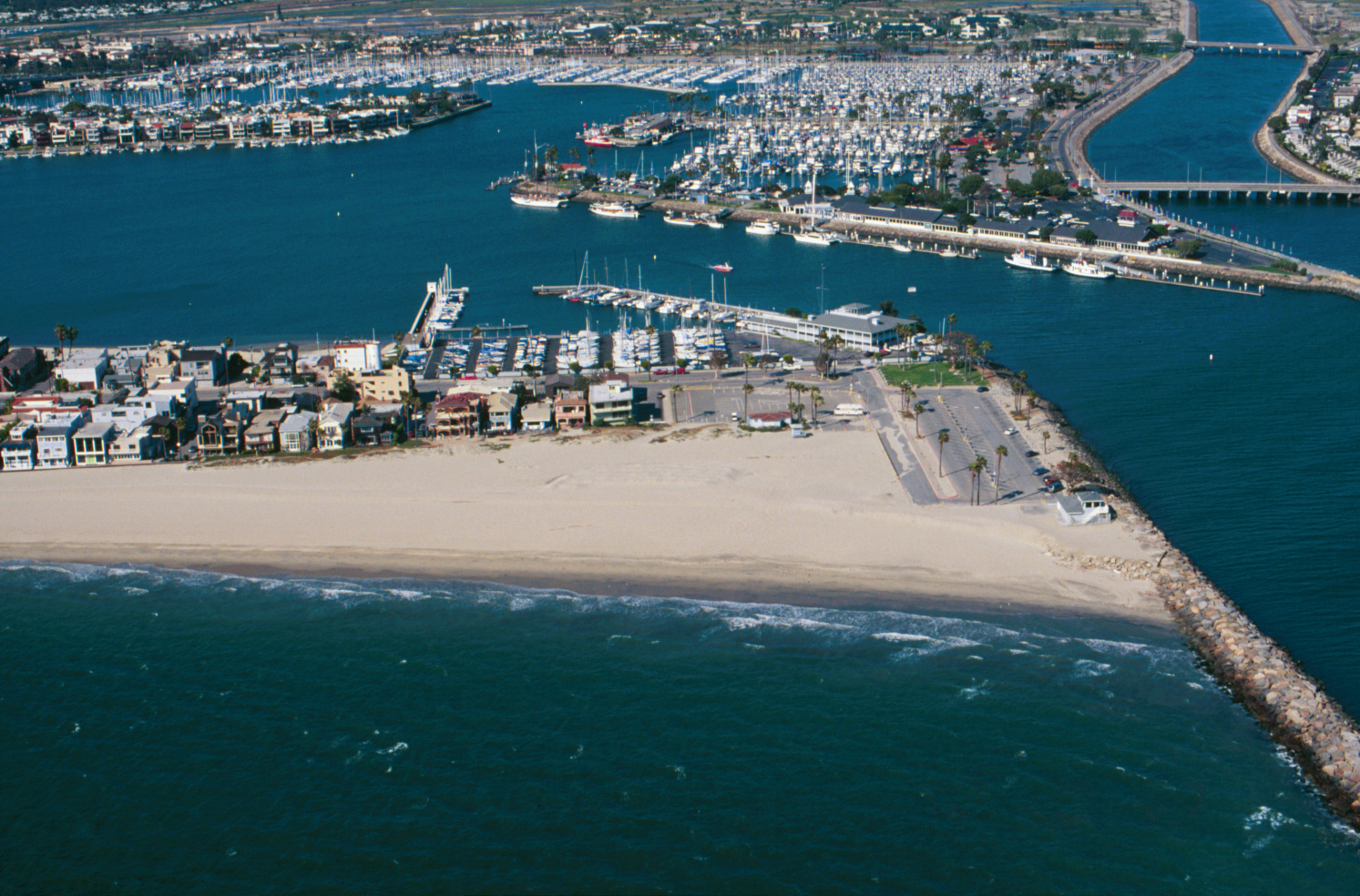
Peninsula

Bay side of Peninsula

Seaside Walk, 2008

Seaside Walk, 2008

== See also ==
- Neighborhoods of Long Beach, California
- Alamitos Bay Yacht Club
