= Naples, Long Beach =

Neighborhood in Los Angeles, USA

Naples, California
- Neighborhood of Long Beach
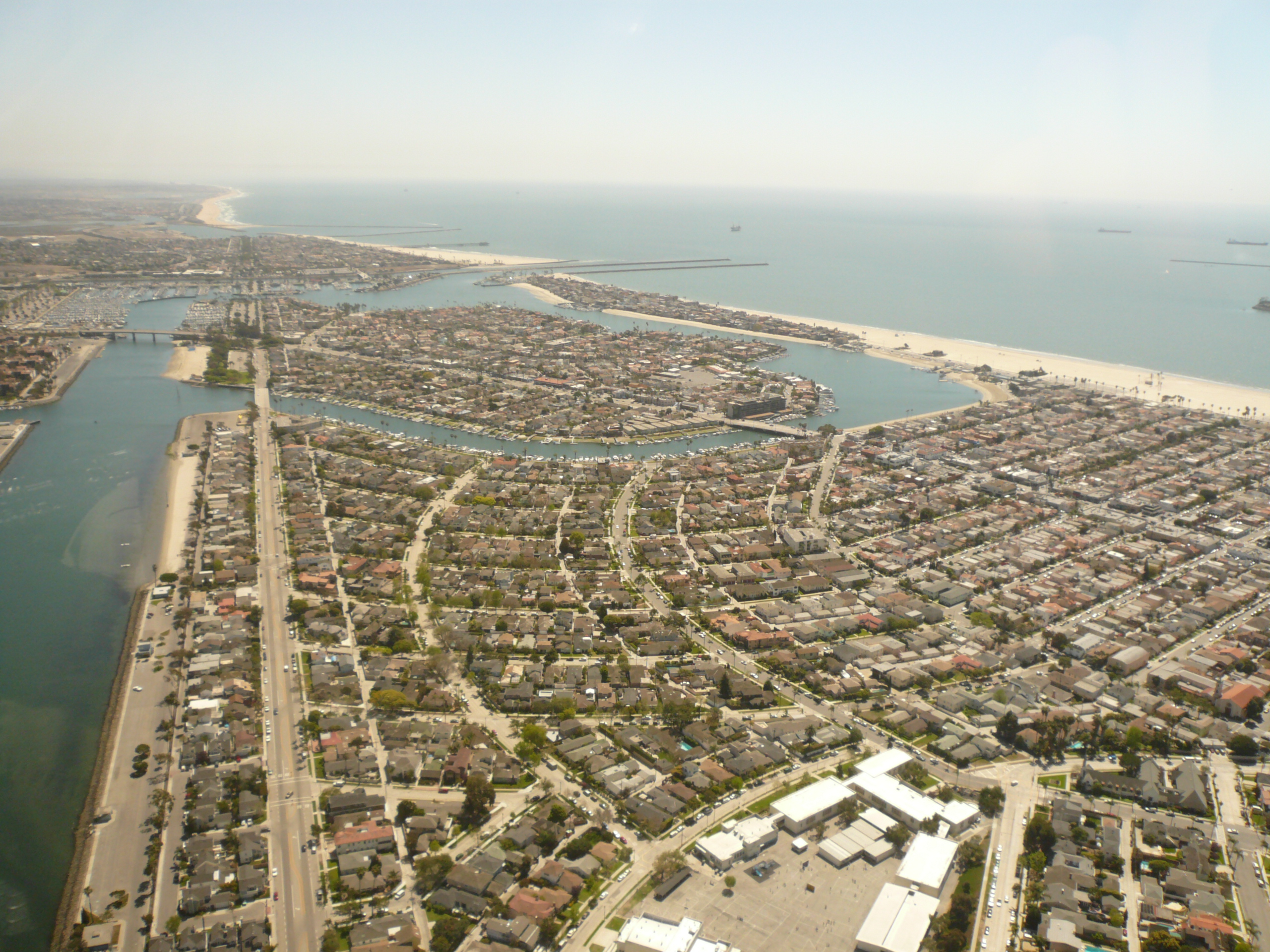
- Naples Island is in the middle distance in this photo, with Belmont Park in the foreground, Belmont Shore to the right, and The Peninsula and the neighboring city of Seal Beach beyond, looking southeast.

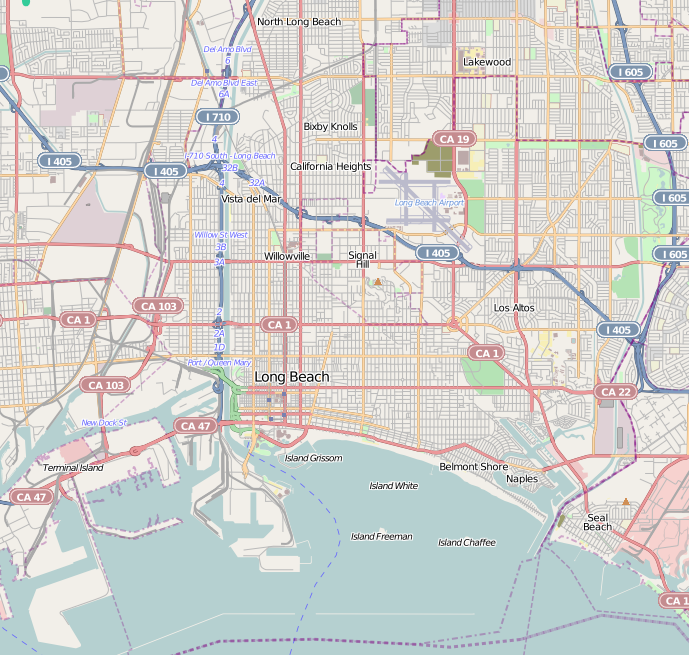
- Location within Long Beach
- Coordinates: 33°45′14″N 118°07′20″W
- Country: United States
- State: California
- County: Los Angeles
- City: Long Beach
- Website: www.naplesislands.org

Naples is a neighborhood of Long Beach, California, United States, built on three islands located in Alamitos Bay. The islands are divided by canals which open into the bay. Most of the streets on the island have Italianate names. The center of Naples features a large fountain which serves as a popular meeting spot. The city was named after the Italian city Naples.

== History ==
Naples was once marshland within the artificial Alamitos Bay, at the mouth of the San Gabriel River. Around 1903, Arthur M. Parsons raised $500,000 from investors and purchased the marshland from the Alamitos Land Company.

Construction began in August, 1905, reshaping the existing land and water into the three islands of Naples. Contracts for the construction of concrete bulkheads (seawalls), stairways and dredging were awarded that month to the Atlantic, Gulf & Pacific Company, headquartered in New York. The project called for 13,000 linear feet of concrete bulkhead and 300,000 cubic yards of dredging and earth filling behind the bulkheads, which elevated the new islands to a uniform height.

The design was by the firm Mayberry & Parker, who also contributed to the Hotel Wentworth in Pasadena. The concept of canals and gondolas was similar to the "Venice of America" developed by Abbot Kinney up the coast. Parson's Naples Land Company called its plans the "Dreamland of Southern California," and projected that "through the canals and under the high arching bridges gay gondoliers will propel their crafts like those in the waters of the Adriatic under the blue skies of Italy." The project was completed in the 1920s.

The Naples seawall was rebuilt in 1938 following the 1933 Long Beach earthquake. Work to replace this aging seawall began in 2015. The work has halted over funding disputes.

From 1904 to 1950, the neighborhood was served by the Pacific Electric Balboa Line.

== Gallery ==
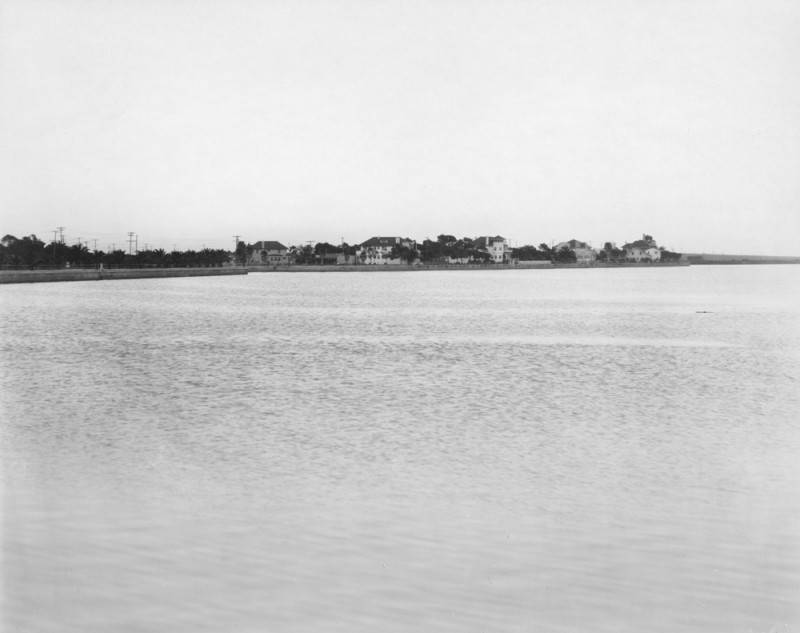
The Naples shoreline in 1908

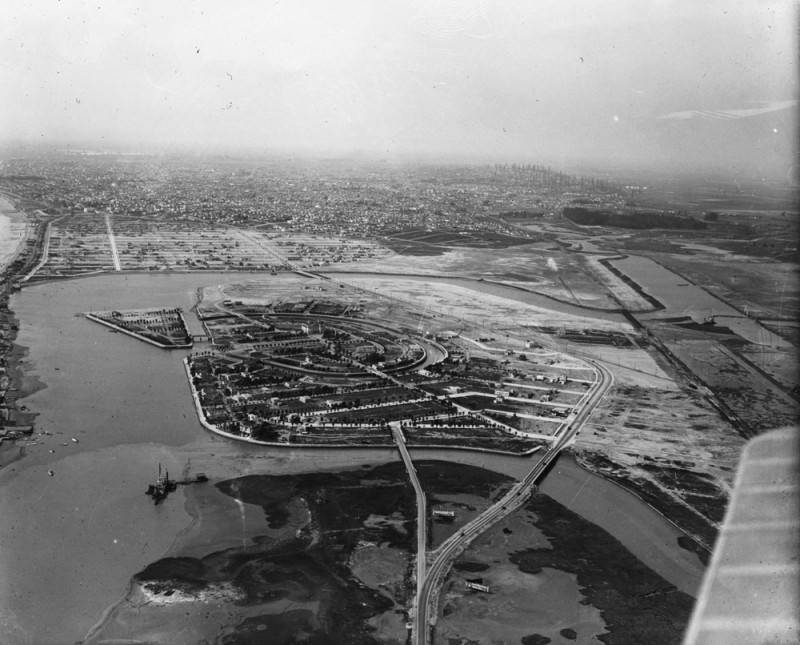
Aerial view of Naples with bridges from Ionia Walk (33.752058°N 118.119168°W) and E. Naples Plaza, now removed, c. 1925

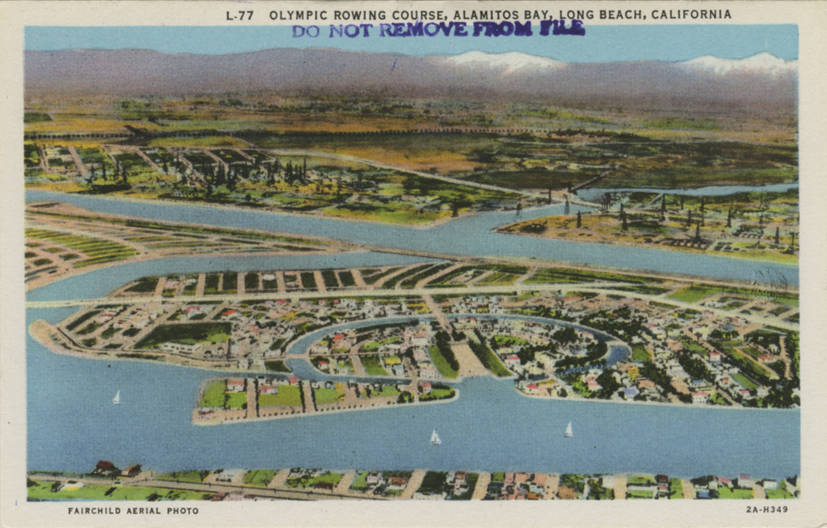
Postcard, 1932

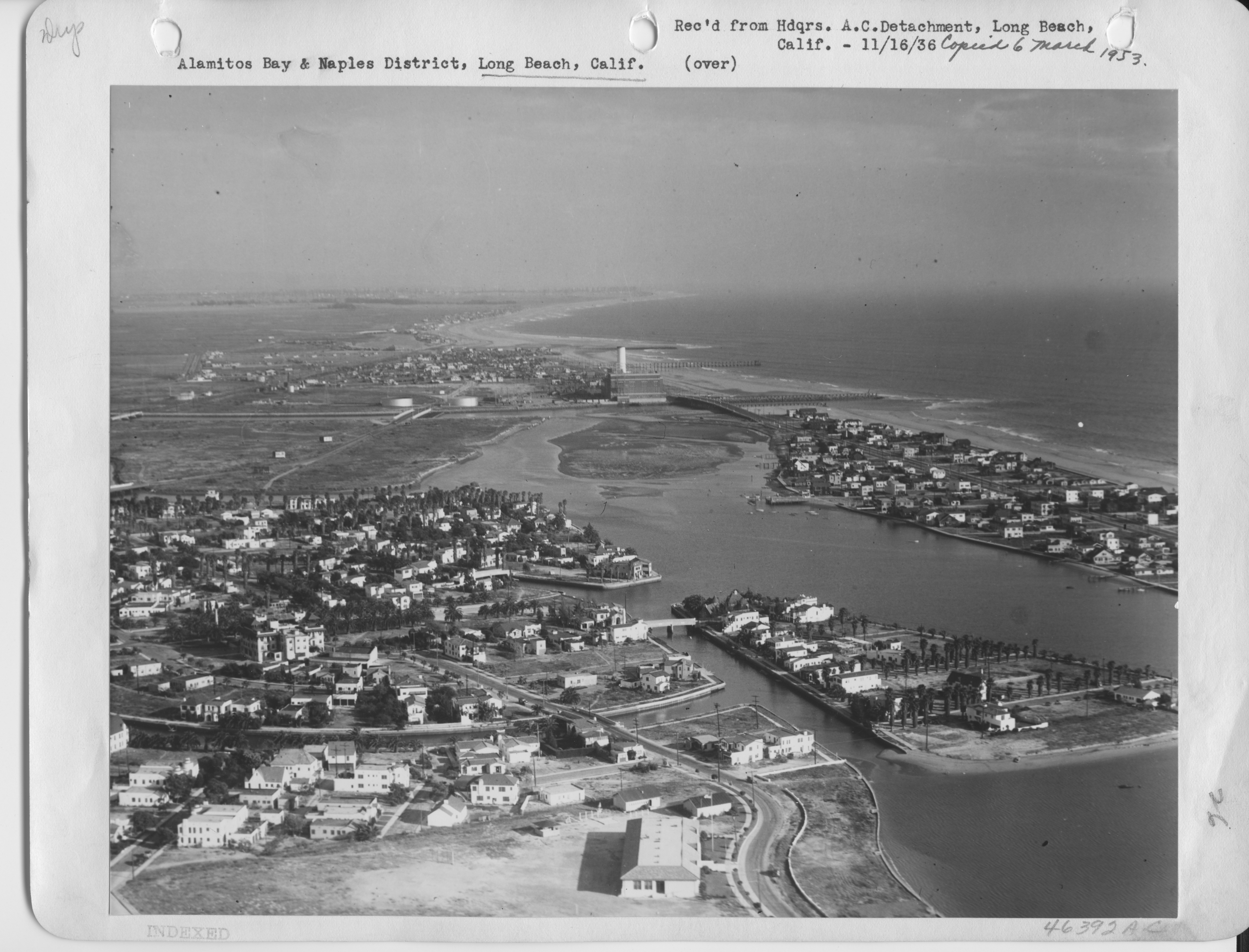
Naples, Treasure Island and the Peninsula in 1936

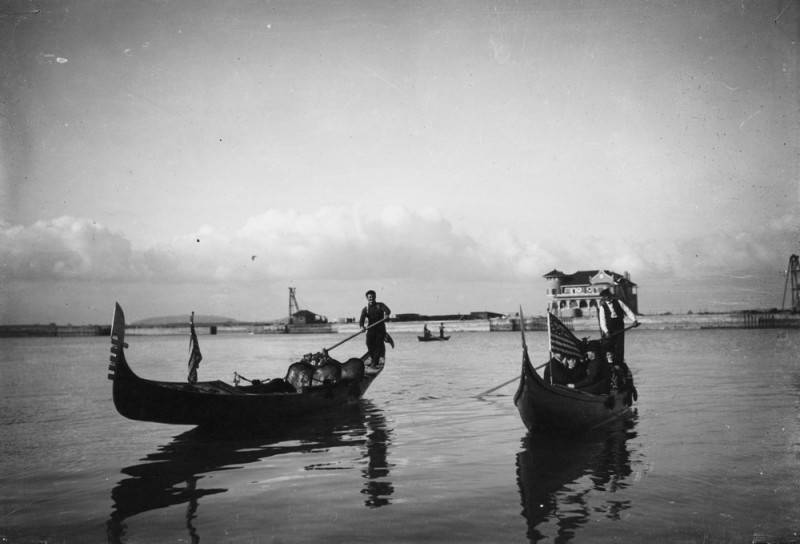
Gondala ride in Alamitos Bay, date unknown

== Activities ==
=== Marine Park AKA "Mother's Beach" ===
This sheltered beach allows for various activities due to the volleyball courts, play area and picnic sites. Known as "Mother's Beach" for its gentle wave action, as well as its shallow swimming area paired with lifeguard supervision during peak periods. Marina Park offers both a great beach for kids and a nearby grassy play area.

=== Christmas Boat Parade ===
One very popular Christmas-time event in Naples is the "Naples Island Christmas Boat Parade," with groups of decorated boats going through the canals of Naples, around Alamitos Bay, and past Belmont Shore. The parade has been held since 1946.

The "Trees in the Bay" floating Christmas tree tradition dates to 1949.

=== On the Bay Fun ===
At various locations near Naples Island, services for kayak rentals, stand-up paddle boarding, and hydro biking are available. Hydro bikes, are similar to paddle boats, yet are elevated in design to allow for better site-seeing. They also come in single occupancy and double occupancy.

=== Overlook Park ===
Known locally as Naples Plaza. This small bay front park is a tear-drop shaped strip of land stretching from the west end of Corso di Napoli and terminating at the east end of Corso di Oro. It has a few park benches with a view of Seal Beach as well as Alamitos Bay.

=== La Bella Fontana di Napoli ===
A small park located in the middle of Naples Island that includes benches, a view of the bay, a grass lawn, and a three-tiered circular fountain. It was originally named "Circle Park Naples" in 1933, and renamed in 1934 to "Bella Flora Park." In 1971, the park was given its current name "La Bella Fontana di Napoli".

== Education ==
Naples residents are zoned to Long Beach Unified School District schools:

- Naples Bayside Academy
- Will Rogers Middle School
- Wilson Classical High School

== Architecture ==
- Killingsworth, Brady, Smith and Associates - The Frank House, also known as Case Study House #25
- Killingsworth, Brady, and Smith - The Opdahl Residence
- Ray Kappe

== Appearances in popular culture ==
- Several episodes of Sea Hunt

== See also ==
- Neighborhoods of Long Beach, California
- Long Beach Marine Stadium
- Naples Sabot
