= Belmont Shore, Long Beach, California =

Belmont Shore, California
- Neighborhood of Long Beach
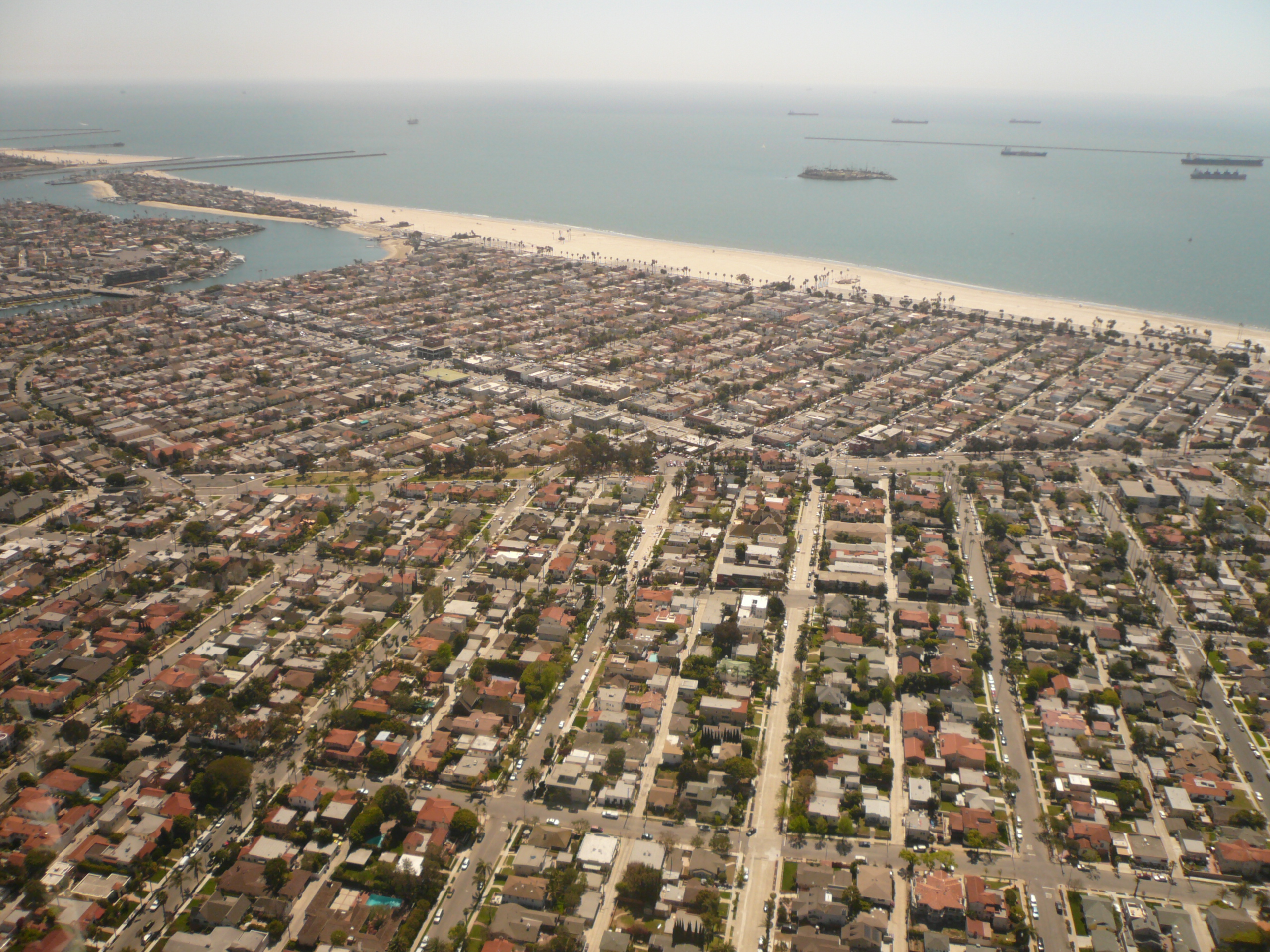
- The Belmont Shore neighborhood of Long Beach, California in the upper-middle of this image, with the Belmont Heights neighborhood in the lower half, looking southeast. 2nd Street cuts diagonally across the left of this image.

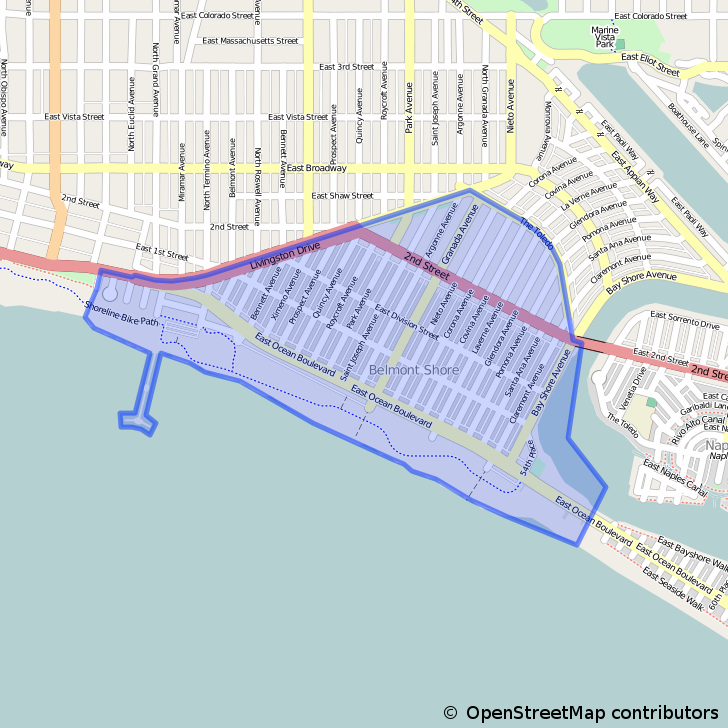
- Map of Belmont Shore within Long Beach

- Location within the United States
- Coordinates: 33°45′26″N 118°08′13″W
- Country: United States of America
- State: California
- County: Los Angeles
- City: Long Beach
- Website: shoreresidents.com

Belmont Shore is a neighborhood in Long Beach, California. It is home to many shops, restaurants, salons, and business offices.

== Geography ==
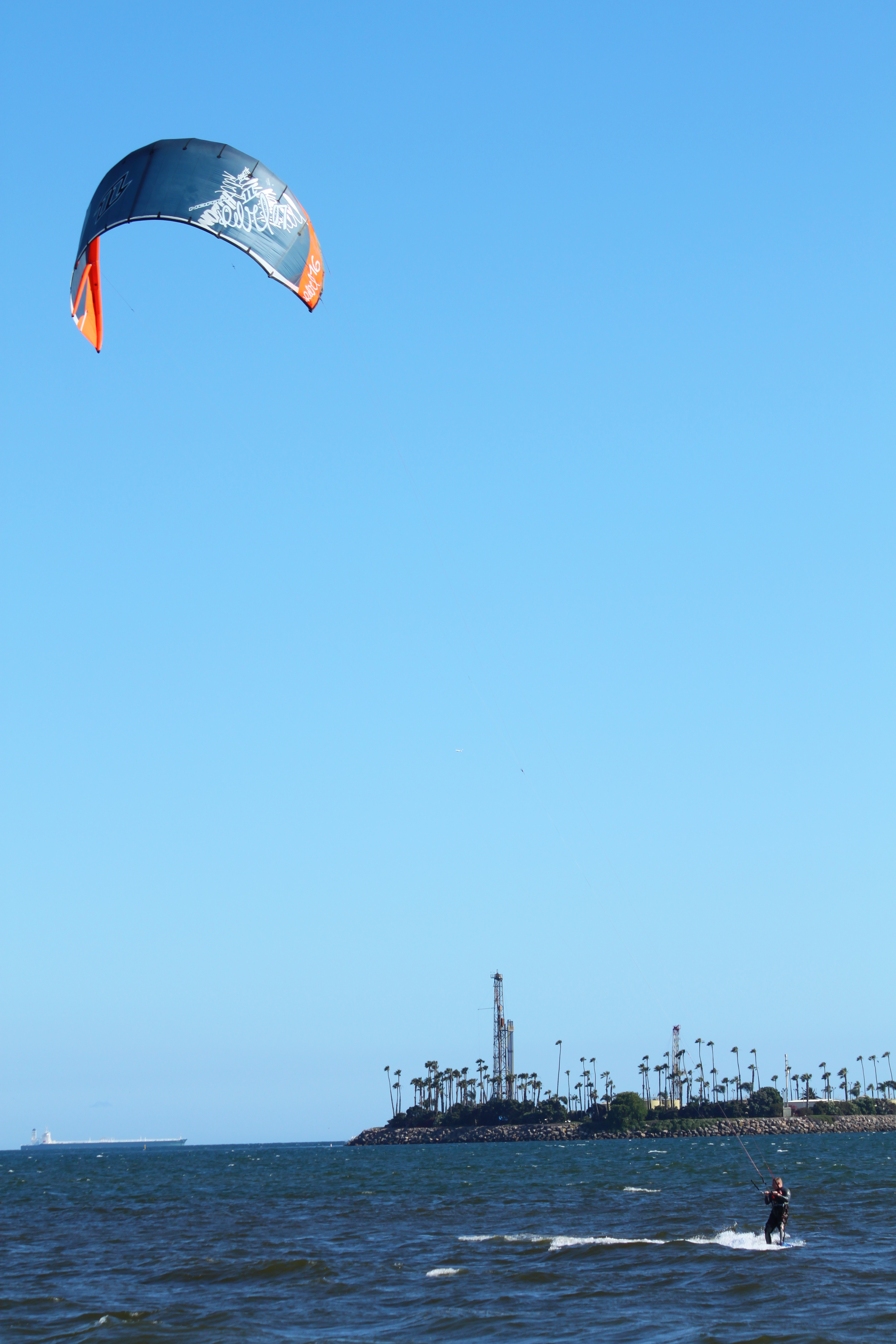
A kitesurfer off of Belmont Shore in 2009.

Livingston Drive and 2nd Street form the heart of Belmont Shore, from approximately Bluff Park on the west to Alamitos Bay and Naples Island on the east. The eastern border of Alamitos Bay Beach is an inland beach that faces Naples Island across a channel. 2nd Street and the fifteen intersecting side streets make up the business district of Belmont Shore. The neighborhood features Spanish-style homes from the 1920s and 1930s, older houses remodeled and expanded into contemporary styles, numerous large contemporary houses, and sections of multifamily apartment buildings.

The business district is represented by the Belmont Shore Business Association (BSBA), and the residents are represented by the Belmont Shore Residents Association (BSRA).

The southern coast of Belmont Shore is a south-facing Pacific Ocean beach that lies just inside the Long Beach breakwater. Due to the presence of the Federal breakwater, this beach experiences very little surf and is not as popular for beachgoing during the summer months as are the nearby beaches of Seal Beach or Huntington Beach, for example. The area offshore of the ocean beach is, however, popular with kitesurfers, kayakers, and boaters.

Each summer, the portion of Bay Shore Avenue south of 2nd Street, at the eastern end of Belmont Shore, is closed to traffic from 9 a.m. until 5 p.m. and converted into a pedestrian and bicycle-only zone.

At the intersection of 54th Place and Ocean Boulevard, at the southeastern corner of Belmont Shore, lies the entrance to the Peninsula, a narrow, mile-long neighborhood of Long Beach surrounded by water on both sides and the Alamitos Channel at the far end.

Horny Corner at Bay Shore Avenue and 54th Place is a popular gathering spot. Allegedly, the original name was Hornay's Corner, originating from a city planner named Thomas Hornay who was involved with dredging the Naples canals.

The approximately 1900-foot-long retaining wall along Ocean Boulevard was constructed around 1939 by the Works Progress Administration to protect the neighborhood from high tide. The neighborhood was severely impacted by the 1939 California tropical storm.

== Activities ==
The Leeway Sailing and Aquatics Center on Alamitos Bay in Belmont Shore is a youth sailing program founded in 1929. The city claims it is one of the premier municipal instructional sailing programs in the country.

The US Sailing Center is located on the Alamitos Bay Peninsula in Long Beach. The Sailing Center offers a wide range of programs for high school, college, and Olympic sailors, in addition to programs for at-risk youth through local help groups, Learn-to-Sail classes for all ages, and disabled sailing opportunities through the Sailing Center's own Disabled Sailing Association.

The Belmont Shore Car Show is the largest one-day annual car show held on the west coast. The car show is typically held in September.

The Long Beach Sea Festival has ocean- and beach-related events in Belmont Shore. The festival was first staged 50 years ago with a handful of events. Currently, the Sea Festival offers around 100 events, ranging from sand castle building to free Moonlight Movies on the beach, to boat racing.

Since its inception in August 1964, the Congressional Cup has grown into one of the major international sailing events. Now held in April, it is the only grade 1 match race regatta held in the United States. The one-on-one race format is the same as the America's Cup, and many of the winners of the Congressional Cup have gone on to win the America's Cup as well. The event is held in the waters off Belmont Shore, with spectator areas on the Belmont Veterans Memorial Pier.

Kitesurfing is popular in Belmont Shore because of steady side-onshore winds (10 to 25+ knots), large open bodies of water, and good launch areas.

== Education ==
Belmont Shore residents are zoned to Long Beach Unified School District schools:

- Lowell Elementary
- Will Rogers Middle School
- Woodrow Wilson Classical High School

== Gallery ==
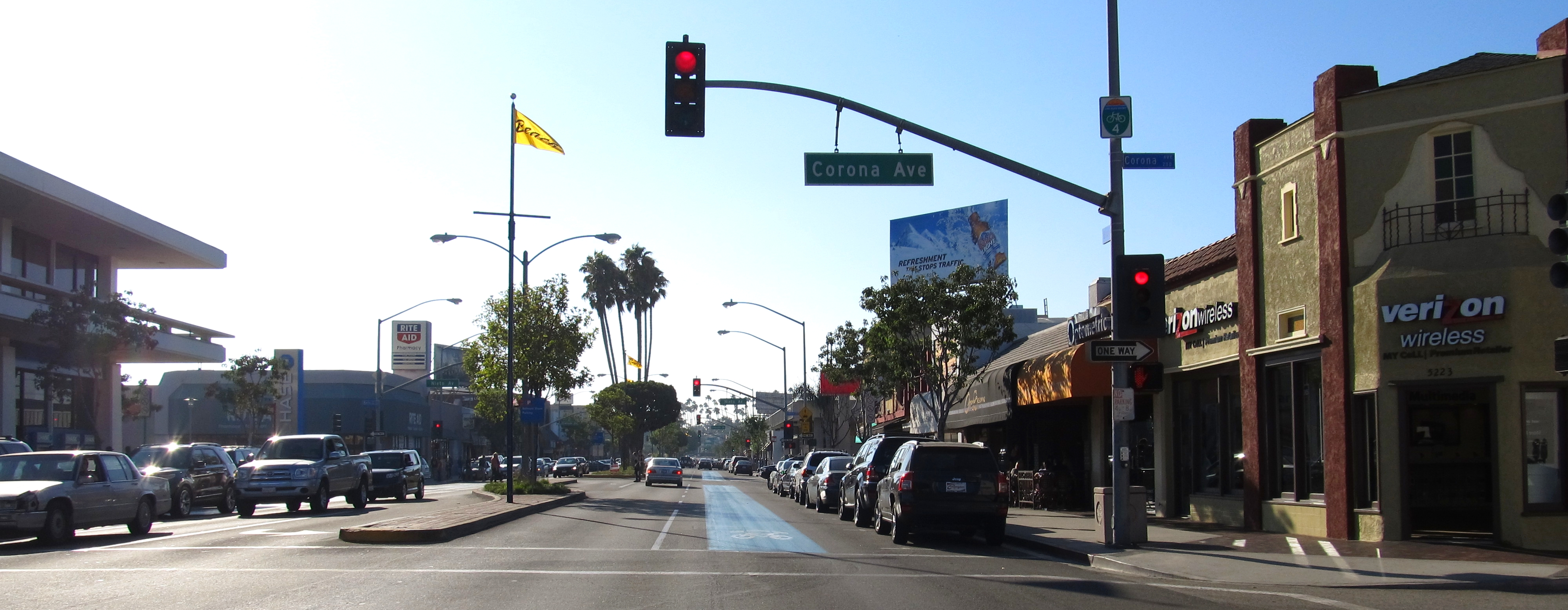
2nd Street and Corona Avenue

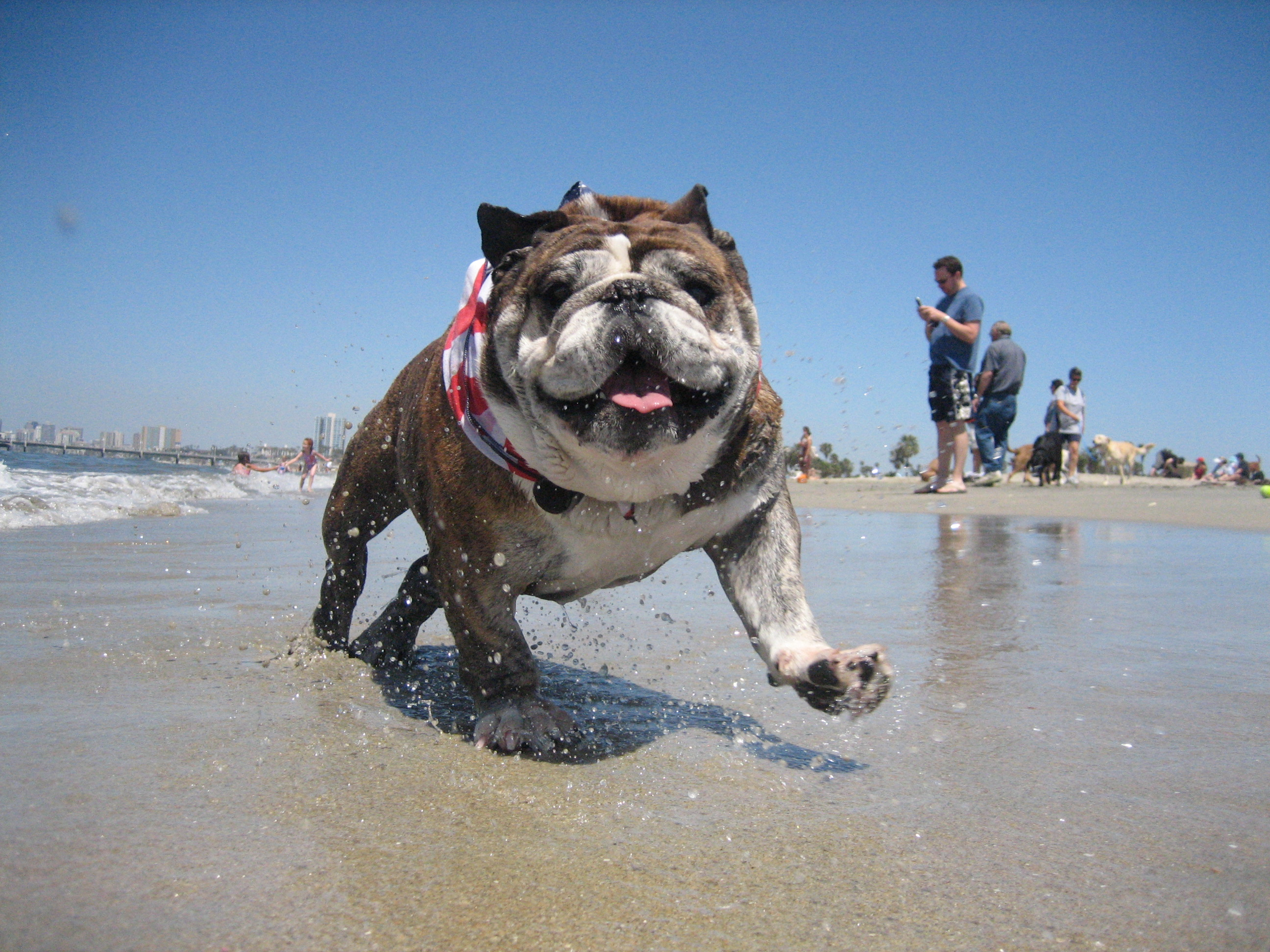
Rosie's Dog Beach

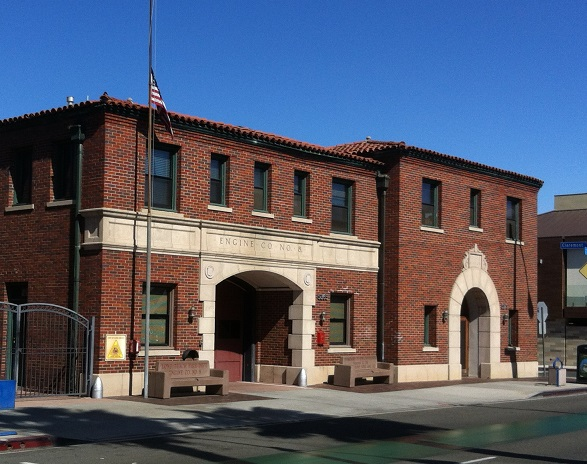
L.B.F.D. Engine Company No. 8, constructed 1929

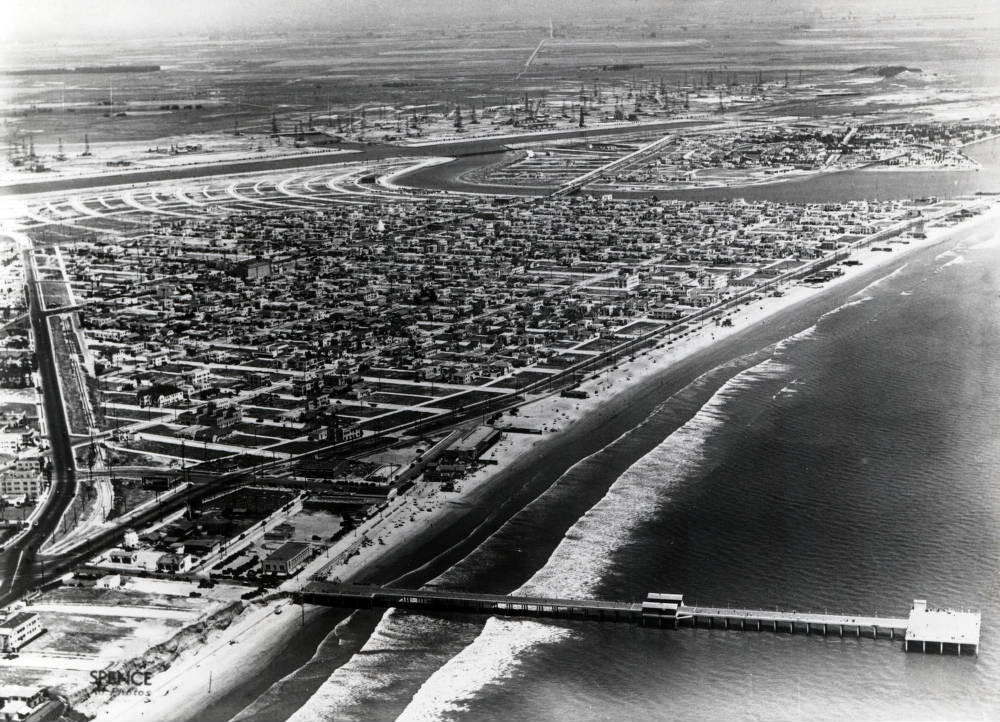
Aerial view taken of the early development of Belmont Shore, 1929

== See also ==
- List of cities in Los Angeles County, California
- Neighborhoods of Long Beach, California
- Belmont Shore Rugby Club
