= Killy =

Killy may refer to:

== People ==
- Edward Killy (1903–1981), American filmmaker
- Jean-Claude Killy (born 1943), French Olympic skier
- Jim Killy (born 1942), Hungarian footballer
- Walther Killy (1917–1985), German literary scholar, Der Killy
- Killy (rapper) (born 1997) Canadian hip-hop artist, song-writer and rapper

== Character ==
- Killy (Blame!), a character in the manga Blame!

== Places ==
- Killingworth, England
  - Killingworth (disambiguation)
- Killie, a nickname for Kilmarnock, Scotland

== Other ==
- Another name for the pocket billiards game, Kelly pool
