= Killingsworth =

Killingsworth may refer to:

- Killingsworth (surname)
- Killingsworth (album), a 2009 album by The Minus 5

== See also ==
- Killingworth (disambiguation)
