= Belmont Heights, Long Beach, California =

Coordinates: 33.7689°N 118.1425°W

Belmont Heights, California
- Neighborhood of Long Beach
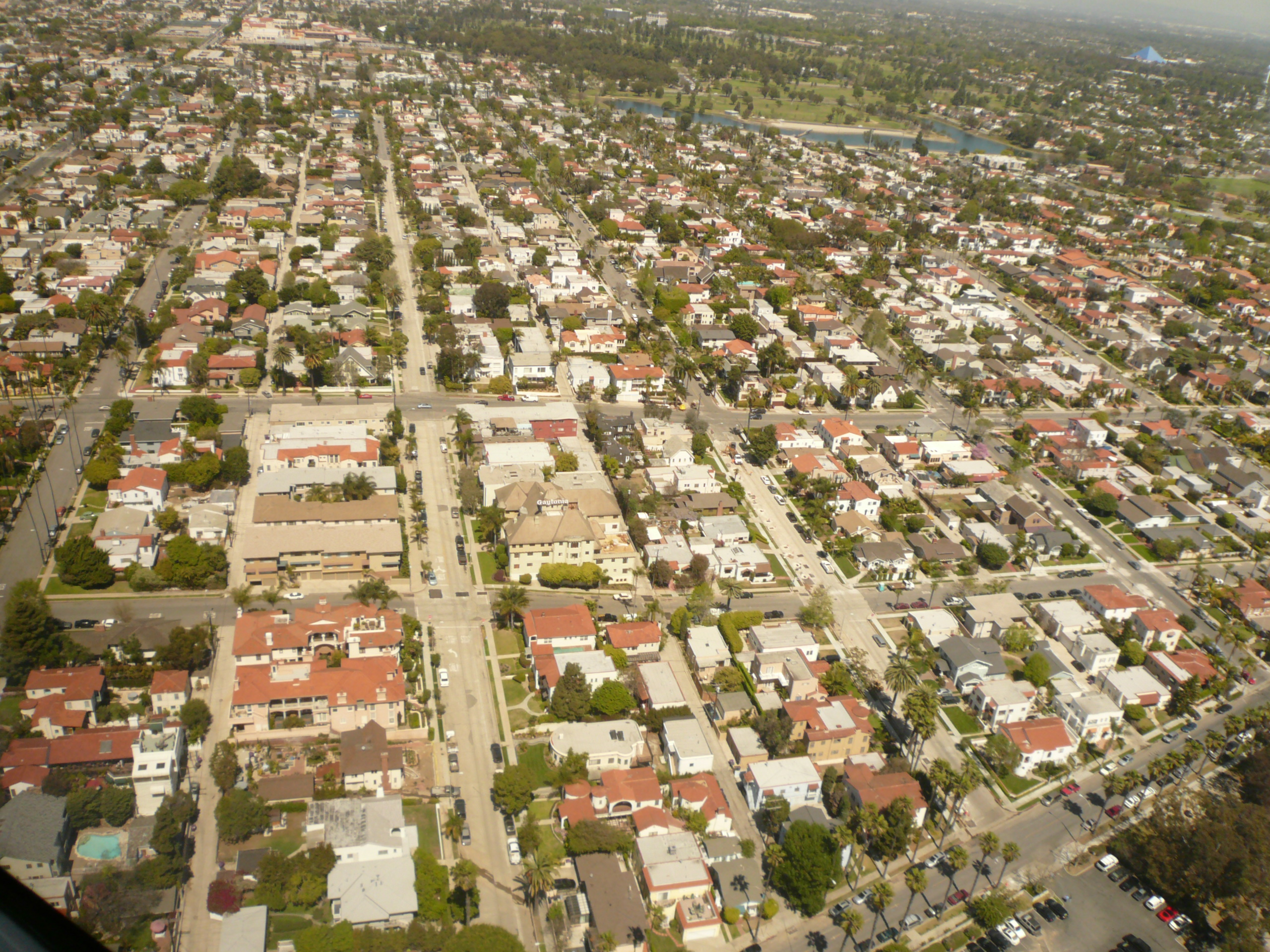
- The Belmont Heights neighborhood of Long Beach, California, looking north.
- Interactive map of Belmont Heights, California
- Country: United States
- State: California
- County: Los Angeles
- City: Long Beach
- Website: www.mybelmontheights.org

Belmont Heights is a district in the south-east portion of the city of Long Beach, California, United States, bordering Bluff Park, Bluff Heights, Recreation Park, Belmont Park, Belmont Shore, and the Pacific Ocean. The district commemorates the old City of Belmont Heights, which was incorporated in 1908 and annexed to Long Beach in 1909. Belmont Heights' borders are Ocean Boulevard and Livingston Drive to the south, Redondo Avenue on the west, 7th Street to the North, and Nieto Avenue to the east. The area is mostly residential, but also has an active business district, the strip of Broadway east of Redondo Avenue.

== History ==
The Belmont Heights Historic District includes homes between 7th Street on the north, 4th Street on the south, Newport Avenue on the west and Roswell Avenue on the east. A few properties located on 4th and 7th streets are included. The neighborhood was first subdivided and developed in the 1900s (decade). The oldest homes surviving today date from 1905. The predominant architectural style in the district is the Craftsman bungalow. Out of 304 homes surveyed, 206 are "contributing" Craftsman bungalows, and 125 of these are pristine unaltered examples. Other architectural styles found in the area that are considered contributing are Victorian, Mediterranean and Spanish Colonial Revival, Tudor Revival and Neo-Traditional. The period of architectural significance for the district is 1905–39. Construction peaked in 1922. Most homes are single-family, with some duplexes and a few apartment houses. Thirty-seven of the homes surveyed were ranked as "noncontributing", or 13 percent. The district commemorates the old City of Belmont Heights, which was incorporated in 1908 and annexed to Long Beach in 1909.

Belmont Heights was incorporated as a city for one year before it annexed with Long Beach in 1909. Long Beach at the time was a dry town, so residents looking for alcohol would head over to the Heights for a drink at one of the taverns.

The Green Long Beach Festival was created after several activists shared ideas at the Viento y Agua Coffee Shop in Belmont Heights.

== Notable landmarks and architecture ==
- Belmont Veterans Memorial Pier
- Eliot Lane – in 2003 residents on the street sought historic designation to protect the look of the 30 homes. The movement was started by homeowner Linda Becker Babiak whose family owned a "Spanish eclectic" home on Eliot Lane since 1925. The homes are still small – 600 to 900 square feet – and there are seven versions of the popular Spanish Revival or Craftsman Bungalow homes in the tract, all built in 1923 by Boland & Smith. For most of the street's life it was called "Eliot Court" because it was designed to be pedestrian and intimate in scale.
- Brown's Court Apartments – located at 3615-3623 E. Colorado Street, it was built as a Spanish Bungalow Court in 1923. It was awarded a Long Beach Heritage Preservation Award in 2015.
- Long Beach Green Belt path
- The Gaytonia – Medieval Revival apartment house named for original owner George Thomas Gayton; designed by Reginald Freemont Inwood

== Local schools ==
The following schools are part of the Long Beach Unified School District.

Elementary schools

- John C. Fremont Elementary School, 4000 East 4th Street
- Lowell Elementary School, 5201 East Broadway
- Horace Mann Elementary School, 257 Coronado Avenue

Middle schools

- Jefferson Leadership Academies, 750 Euclid Avenue
- Will Rogers Middle School, 365 Monrovia Avenue

High School

- Woodrow Wilson Classical High School, 4400 E. 10th Street

== Notable people ==
Notable residents include:

- Clippers President Andy Roeser (born 1959). He moved from the Valley in Tarzana to 104 Quincy in Belmont Shore and six years later moved to Belmont Heights. "I said to my wife, `This is where I want to live. It has everything I want - the ocean, the restaurants, the shops.'" He's a member of the Long Beach Yacht Club and the Belmont Athletic Club. He can also be seen kite-boarding near Claremont and Ocean.
- Former Los Angeles Rams player Marlin McKeever (1940–2006). He was a two-time All-American at USC and 13-year pro.
- Author and screenwriter Obie Scott Wade. His production company, ObieCo Entertainment, Inc. is located in the historically significant Elizabethan Studio designed by noted architect Joseph H. Roberts.

== See also ==
- Neighborhoods of Long Beach, California
