= Long Beach Green Belt path =

Long Beach Greenbelt
- Interactive map of Long Beach Greenbelt
- Location: Belmont Heights, Long Beach, California
- Coordinates: 33°46′34″N 118°8′39″W

The Long Beach Greenbelt is an open space habitat for California native plants and pathway in Belmont Heights, Long Beach, California. The abandoned railroad right of way was transformed by community activists after it was slated to become a block of self-storage units.

== History ==
The site served for over half a century as a portion of the Pacific Electric Railway Balboa Line, linking Orange County to downtown Los Angeles. A mural on a garage wall facing the Greenbelt depicts the Red Car. Varying factors caused the closure of the Los Angeles - Long Beach route in 1961; and the site sat mostly vacant until approximately 1999. It was described by an EPA website as "a weed strewn and derelict vacant area". A group of local residents and environmental activists staunchly opposed the conversion of the site to a gated community of single family homes on one portion and self-storage units on another, citing Long Beach's lack of per capita open space land (3.11 acres per 1,000 population).

Uniting as the Long Beach Greenbelt Committee in March 1998, they successfully lobbied to have the entire 11 acres (45,000 m^{2}) of the abandoned Red Car right-of-way remain open space. This preserved an almost 1-mile (1.6 km) pathway from a densely populated portion of the city directly to the park surrounding the Colorado Lagoon. Organizing grants, donations and volunteers the Committee cleared a 2.75-acre (11,100 m^{2}) portion of the site of non-native plants, spread mulch over the entire property by hand and planted over 2000 native plants during 2 "Plant-ins", each attended by over 150 community volunteers. Clearing, site design and planting assistance was provided by Department of Fish and Game botanist John Ekhoff.

Now, almost ten years later, the site is a viable habitat for urban wildlife. Coast live oaks, walnut trees, holly berries, atroplexes, sage, buckwheat, deer weed, and Golden Bushes provide examples of the approximately 40 native plant species on the site. Urban wildlife observed on the site includes raccoons, possums, rabbits, skunks, rodents, grasshoppers, butterflies, moths, and lizards. Birds include large birds of prey to hummingbirds. Tree mulch is spread on the ground to recycle plant matter, suppress weeds, retain moisture, and provide an attractive appearance.

== Access ==
Street parking is generally available on any of the streets surrounding the site, including Bennett, Roswell, Belmont, and Termino Avenues. Local residents access the site by bicycle or foot, often accompanied by their pet dogs. The hard-packed soil along the paths is suitable for bicycle travel when it is dry, although the bumpy terrain is likely not suited for lightweight or road bikes.

== Maintenance and current condition ==
In the early 2000s, the property was rezoned as parkland. As with many volunteer efforts, community energy moved on to more immediate and critical environmental issues. The Greenbelt Committee was disbanded, but the City did not continue to maintain the park. Although intended to re-create a native habitat, the site requires maintenance for the sake of safety and meeting community needs in an urban setting. Plant overgrowth, substance abuse activity, trash, and homeless camps contributed to the general decay of the site. Arson fires set on the Greenbelt upset homeowners and ultimately forced the City to hire the Los Cerritos Wetlands Stewards (LCWS), local contractors already maintaining several other of the City's environmentally sensitive sites, including Sims' Pond, Golden Shore, the Colorado Lagoon, and the Los Cerritos Wetlands.

By August 2004, the Greenbelt was in a degraded condition. Under their contract with the City, the LCWS removed trash and trimmed the plants utilizing the biomass as mulch. Many plants were trimmed or removed and the site was landscaped to increase the open feel and safety/visibility factors of the site. A dispenser for dog waste bags was installed, along with trashcans.

In 2009-2011, The Long Beach Greenbelt was the site for the Los Angeles County Department of Public Works project known as the "Termino Avenue Storm Drain". The project ran directly through the native plantings on the Greenbelt. All plantings were removed, with the oak trees placed in containers for later replanting. As of May 2012 only the oak trees have been replanted, with the rest of the park consisting of open dirt and weeds.

In 2016, Long Beach Councilwoman Suzie Price, unveiled a new plan for the Greenbelt. As of 2016, over $800,000 has been set aside for the improvement project.
