= Killingsworth (surname) =

Killingsworth is a surname. Notable people with the surname include:

- Cleve Killingsworth, American healthcare executive
- Edward Killingsworth (1917–2004), American architect
- Jim Killingsworth (1923–2007), American basketball player and coach
- JoAnn Dean Killingsworth (1923–2015), American actress, dancer and figure skater
- Marco Killingsworth (born 1982), American basketball player
