= Killingworth (disambiguation) =

Killingworth is a town in North Tyneside, England.

Killingworth may also refer to:

== Places ==
- Killingworth Village, a village in North Tyneside, England
- Killingworth, New South Wales, Australia
- Killingworth, Connecticut, United States

== People with the surname ==
- Boyd Killingworth (born 1992), Australian rugby union player
- Grantham Killingworth (1699–1778), English Baptist controversialist

== See also ==
- Killingsworth (disambiguation)
