= Jim Killy =

Hungarian footballer

Personal information
- Full name: Imre Killy
- Date of birth: 20 October 1942 (age 84)
- Place of birth: Budapest, Hungary
- Position: Midfielder

Senior career*
Years	Team	Apps	(Gls)
1963	Toronto Hungaria		
1966–1967	Toronto Hungaria		
1968	Dallas Tornado	5	(0)
1971–1973	Condor Hungarians		
1977	Mississauga Hungaria		
- * Club domestic league appearances and goals

Imre Killy (born October 20, 1942) is a Hungarian former footballer who played as a midfielder.

== Career ==
Killy played in the National Soccer League with Toronto Hungaria in 1963. He returned to play with Hungaria for the 1966 season. He re-signed with Toronto for the 1967 season. In 1968, he played in the North American Soccer League with Dallas Tornado where he appeared in five matches. In 1971, he featured in the International Jubilee soccer tournament with L.A. Hungarians. In the winter of 1971, he played in the Greater Los Angeles Soccer League with Condor Hungarians.

He re-signed with Condor Hungarians for the 1972 season. He was also named to the 1972 Los Angeles All-Star team. He played his third season with Condor in 1973. He featured with the L.A. Hungarians once more in the 1973 International Jubilee soccer tournament. In 1977, he returned to the NSL to play with Mississauga Hungaria where he served as team captain.
