= Edward Killingsworth =

American architect

Edward Killingsworth FAIA (1917–2004) was an American architect. He is best known as a participant in Arts & Architecture's Case Study program in the mid-1950s. He designed and built Case Study House #25, "The Frank House," in Naples, California. He also designed numerous luxury hotels all over the world and a large part of the California State University, Long Beach campus. In the architecture world, his name is associated with Southern California Post-and-Beam Mid-Century Modern.

== Biography ==
Killingsworth was born in Taft on November 4, 1917. Following the discovery of oil on Signal Hill in 1921, his oilman father moved the family south to Long Beach. During Killingsworth's years at Woodrow Wilson Classical High School, his original ambition was to become a painter, but he decided to major in something more practical at the University of Southern California. Killingsworth earned his bachelor of architecture degree in 1940 and received the American Institute of Architects Medal for having the highest academic record in his class.

The start of Killingsworth's professional career was delayed by his service in the U.S. Army Corps of Engineers during World War II. As an operations officer attached to the 654th Engineer Topographic Battalion, Killingsworth earned a Bronze Star for supervising the production of more than 8 million photo-maps in preparation for the Allied invasion of Europe.

Killingsworth met his future wife Laura Baird in 1939. They married in 1943.

After returning from the war, Killingsworth went to work as an associate for Long Beach architect Kenneth S. Wing from in 1946-1953. Killingsworth was discovered in 1950 as John Entenza, creator of the Case Study Program, drove by Killingsworth's in-laws' recently built house in Los Alamitos, California. When Entenza found out Killingsworth was the architect, he invited him to participate in the program. This house was Killingsworth's first solo project and was one of Southern California's first post and beam structures.

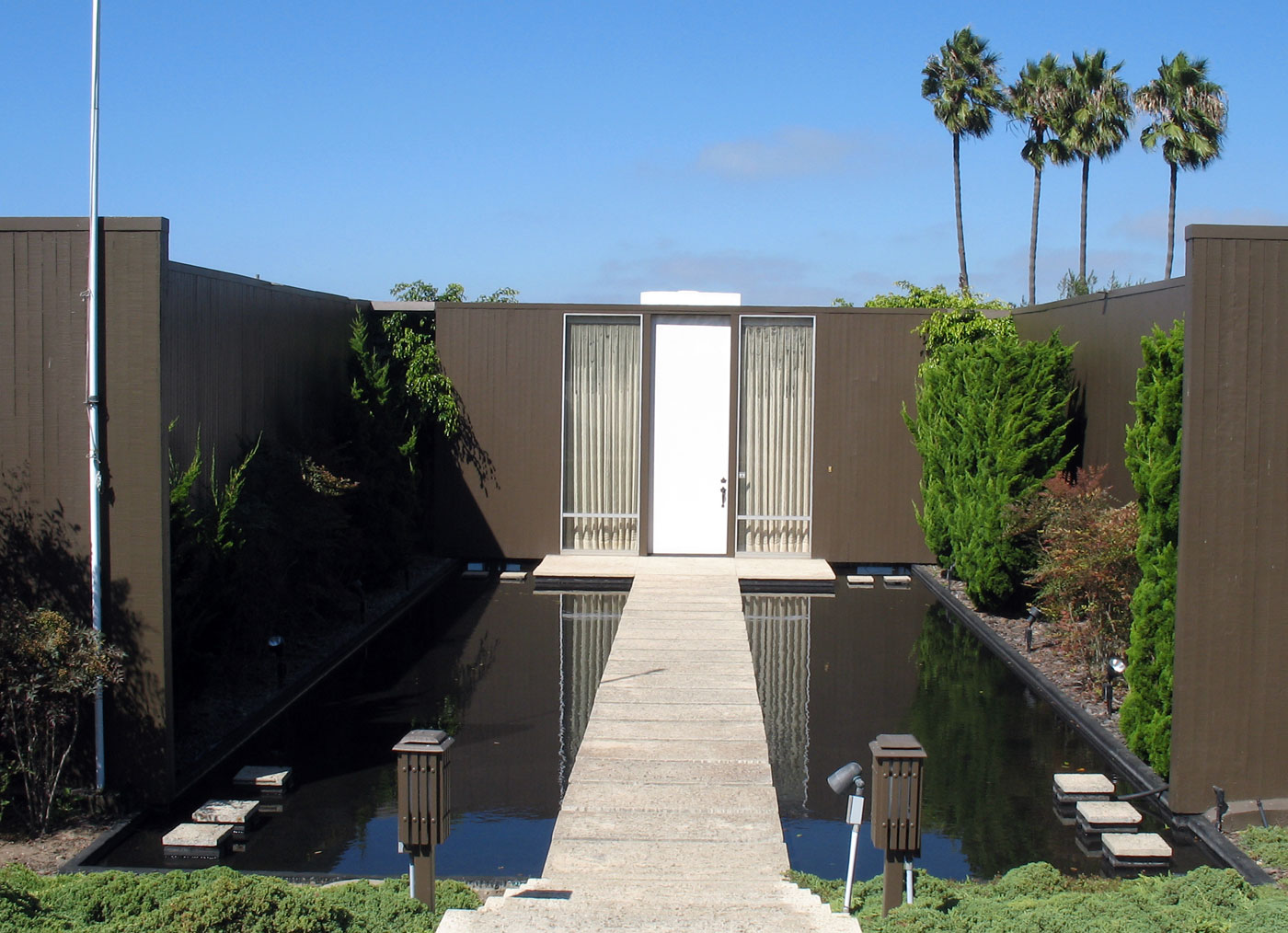
Case Study House No. 23, Killingsworth, Brady and Smith

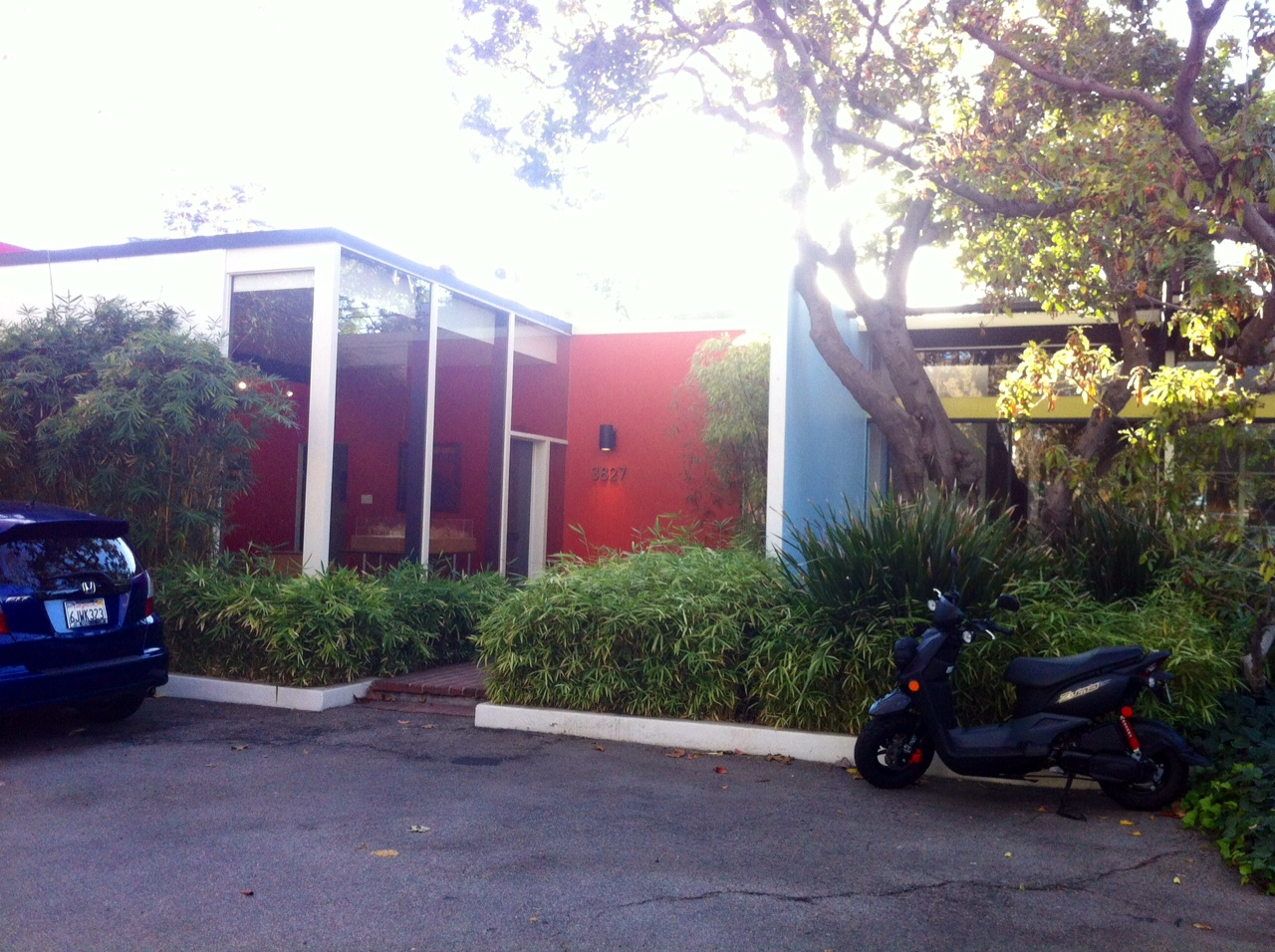
Killingsworth, Brady, and Smith

Edward Killingsworth partnered with Jules Brady (born 1908) and Waugh Smith (1917-2010) in 1953 and together they designed 4 Case Study Houses in 1960 (3 were built and are still standing, though one has been drastically altered), along with the Opdahl house and several other large projects. Waugh Smith left he partnership in 1963. From 1984 until his retirement in the early 2000s, Killingsworth became a partner in Killingsworth, Stricker, Lindgren, Wilson and Associate.

He went on to design many highly acclaimed projects in Long Beach. One of them, the Opdahl House, also in Naples and just blocks away from Case Study House #25, stands as a monument to Mid-Century architecture. By the early-1960s, Killingsworth also went on to design civic and commercial buildings in Long Beach. Killingsworth designed a home for his own family in the Los Cerritos neighborhood of Long Beach. For more than 40 years from 1962, he established and implemented the masterplan for the CSULB campus. Killingsworth designed the main architecture building of his alma mater, the USC School of Architecture's Watt Hall (1974) where he served as adjunct professor.

As the years passed and the honors piled up, Killingsworth's architectural projects grew in size and scale, from residential buildings in Southern California to luxury hotels in such exotic locales as Hawaii, Guam, Japan, South Korea, Malaysia and Indonesia.

Philosophically, like many of his contemporaries, Killingsworth believed in open spaces and floor plans. He preferred high ceilings and glass walls that invited nature in.

Edward A. Killingsworth died on July 6, 2004, at the age of 86. He is entombed at the Forest Lawn Mortuary in Long Beach, California, in the pendulum room of the mausoleum. Laura Killingsworth died on June 2, 2019, at age 95.
