= Belmont Veterans Memorial Pier =

Pier in Belmont Heights, California

Coordinates: 33.755403°N 118.148872°W

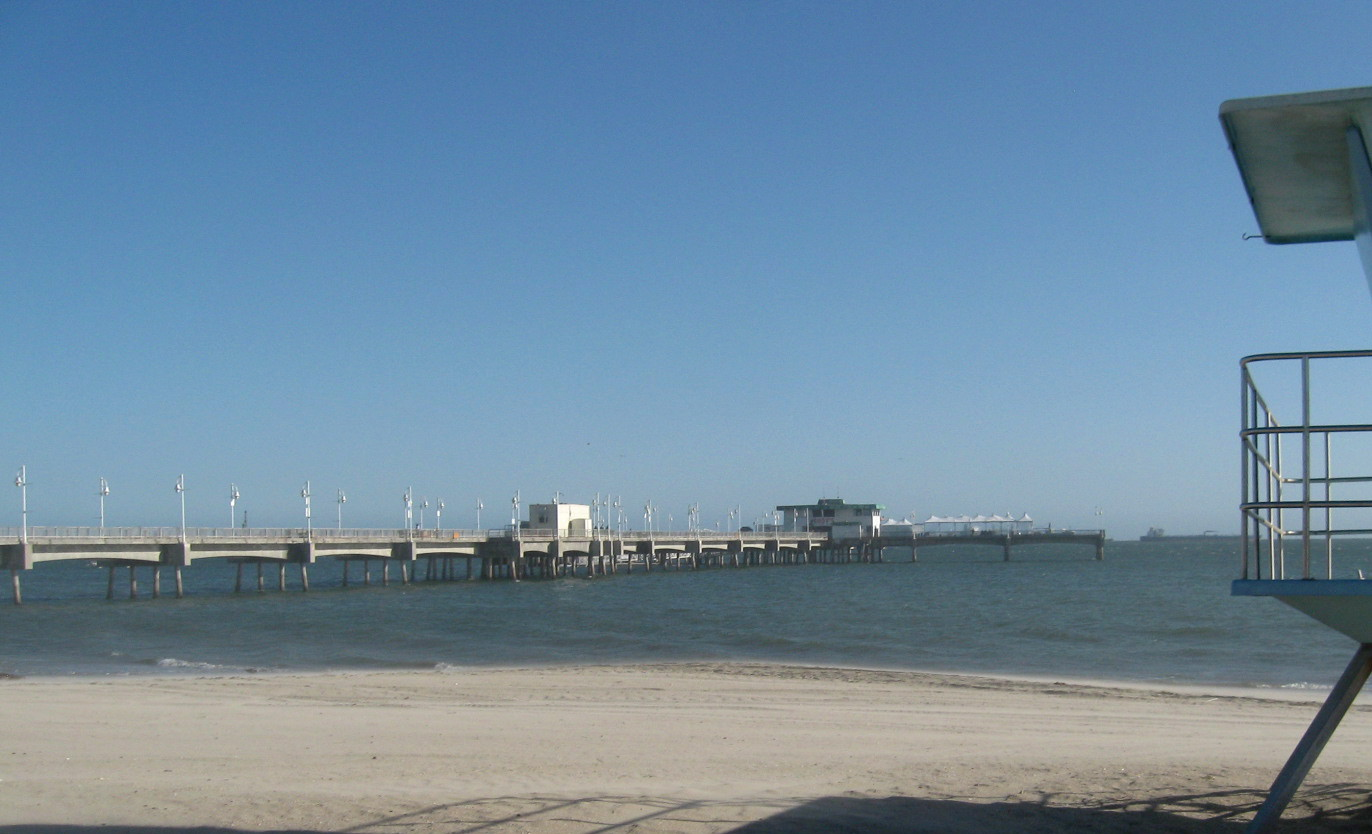
Belmont Veterans Memorial Pier

Belmont Veterans Memorial Pier is a pier in Belmont Heights, Long Beach, California.

The pier is commonly used for fishing and strolling. Sport fishing can be accessed at the end of the pier, as well as a snack stand and bait shop.

== History ==
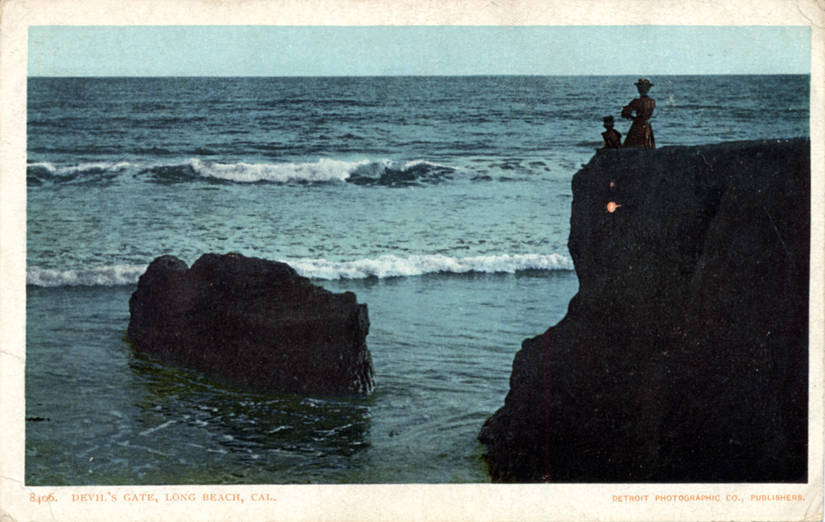
Devil's Gate rock formation, circa 1900-1909

A rock formation named "Devil's Gate" once stood at the pier's location.

In 1908 the citizens of Belmont Heights asked the city to build a pier. The pier has been called the Grand Avenue Pier, the Belmont Heights Pier and Devil's Gate Pier in its history.

When the pier was renamed "Belmont Veterans Memorial Pier" in 2005 an inscription was added at the entrance: "The people of Long Beach dedicate this pier to the men and women of our nation's armed forces, as a tribute to their love of country and a memorial to their sacrifice."

The pier was seen in the sixth-season episode of Dexter, "Those Kinds of Things." In the episode the police find a dead man full of snakes, supposedly on a Miami beach.

The pier will host sailing at the 2028 Summer Olympics.

== Renovations ==
In 2012 the pier was set to receive $800,000 for new restrooms and $250,000 for curb and railings repairs. The nearby pedestrian path was also set to receive a $5 million facelift and expansion.

== Fishing ==
Lights, stations for fish cleaning, restrooms and a bait and tackle shop are available. Fish species reported to be caught off the pier include halibut, barracuda, shark, sand bass, croaker and perch.

== Events ==
The pier hosts an annual pirate-themed festival in the summer. The event includes music, dance, live theatre, black powder presentations, and a costume contest.

A 4th of July party is held on the pier annually. The event includes live music, barbecue food and a beer garden. Formerly, the Long Beach fireworks could be seen from the area.

== See also ==
- The Pike
