= Long Beach Marine Stadium =

Olympic rowing venue in Los Angeles

Coordinates: 33.7611°N 118.1216°W

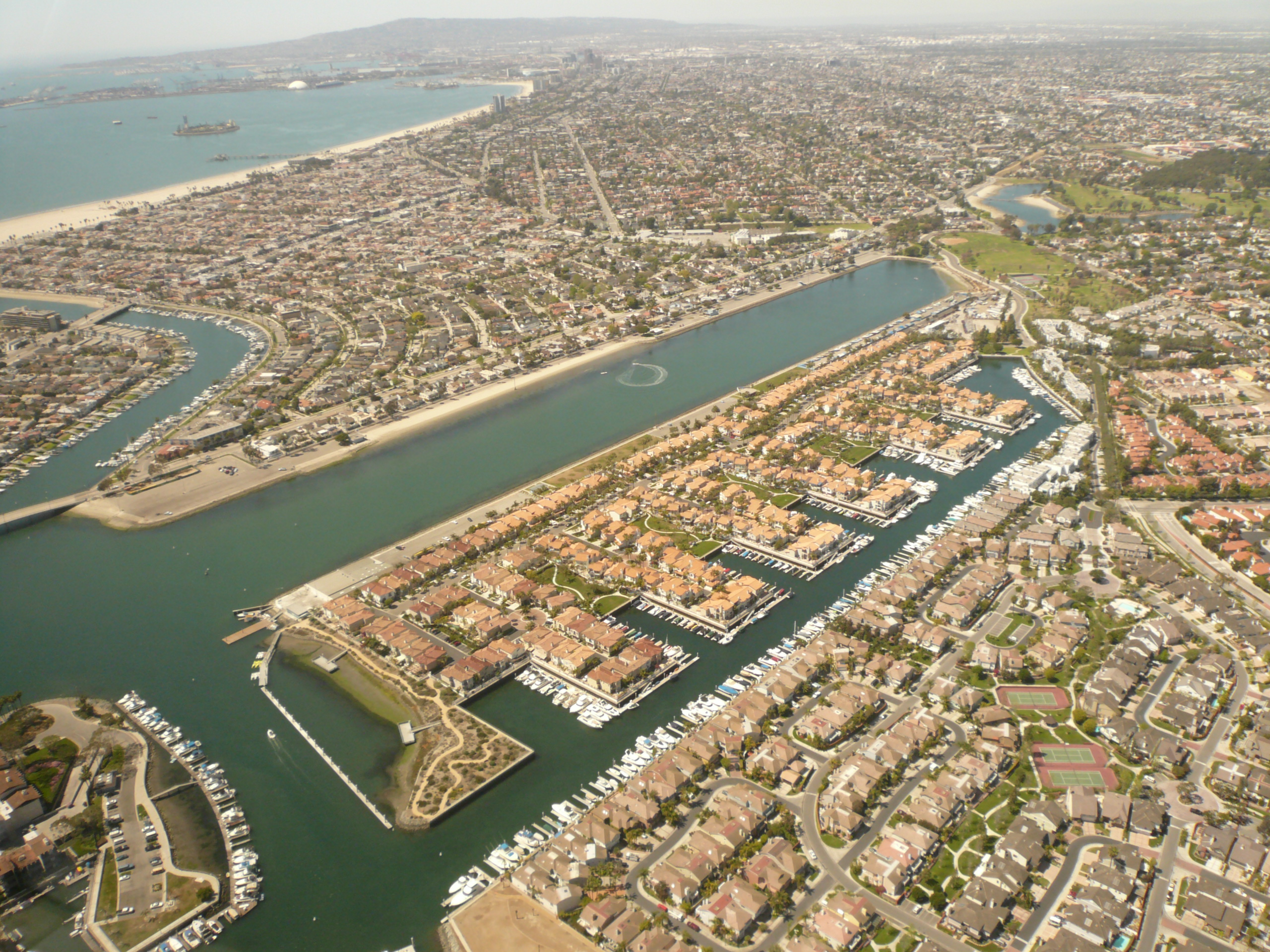
- Aerial view of Marine Stadium in Long Beach, California, looking northwest, with the Belmont Shore neighborhood and beach visible in the near distance, the downtown Long Beach skyline in the middle distance, and the Palos Verdes Peninsula in the background.
- Interactive map of Long Beach Marine Stadium
- Location: 5255 Paoli Way, Long Beach, California
- Owner: City of Long Beach

Construction
- Opened: 1932

California Historical Landmark
- Reference no.: 1014

The Long Beach Marine Stadium is a marine venue located in Long Beach, California. Created in 1932 to host the rowing events for the 1932 Summer Olympics in neighboring Los Angeles, the stadium was the first manmade rowing course in the United States.

== History ==
The site was purchased in 1923 and Marine Stadium was created two years later when the Alamitos Bay was dredged to only 1.5 km (0.93 mi) in length. An additional 0.5 km (0.31 mi) was dredged by 1932 in time for the Olympics in LA. Turf replaced the temporary grandstands in 1997. The following year, the venue expanded to accommodate new teen and disabled rowing programs. Permanent restrooms replaced temporary ones in 2009.

The site is now registered as California Historical Landmark #1014. Marker NO. 1014 at the site reads:

- NO. 1014 LONG BEACH MARINE STADIUM - Created in 1932 for the rowing events of the Xth Olympiad, the Stadium was the first manmade rowing course in the United States. Its width allowed four teams to race abreast, eliminating additional heats and allowing oarsmen to enter the finals at the peak of their form. Later it served as the venue for the 1968 and 1976 United States men's Olympic rowing trials and the 1984 United States women's Olympic rowing trials. The site remains an important training and competitive center for rowers, including our National and Olympic teams.
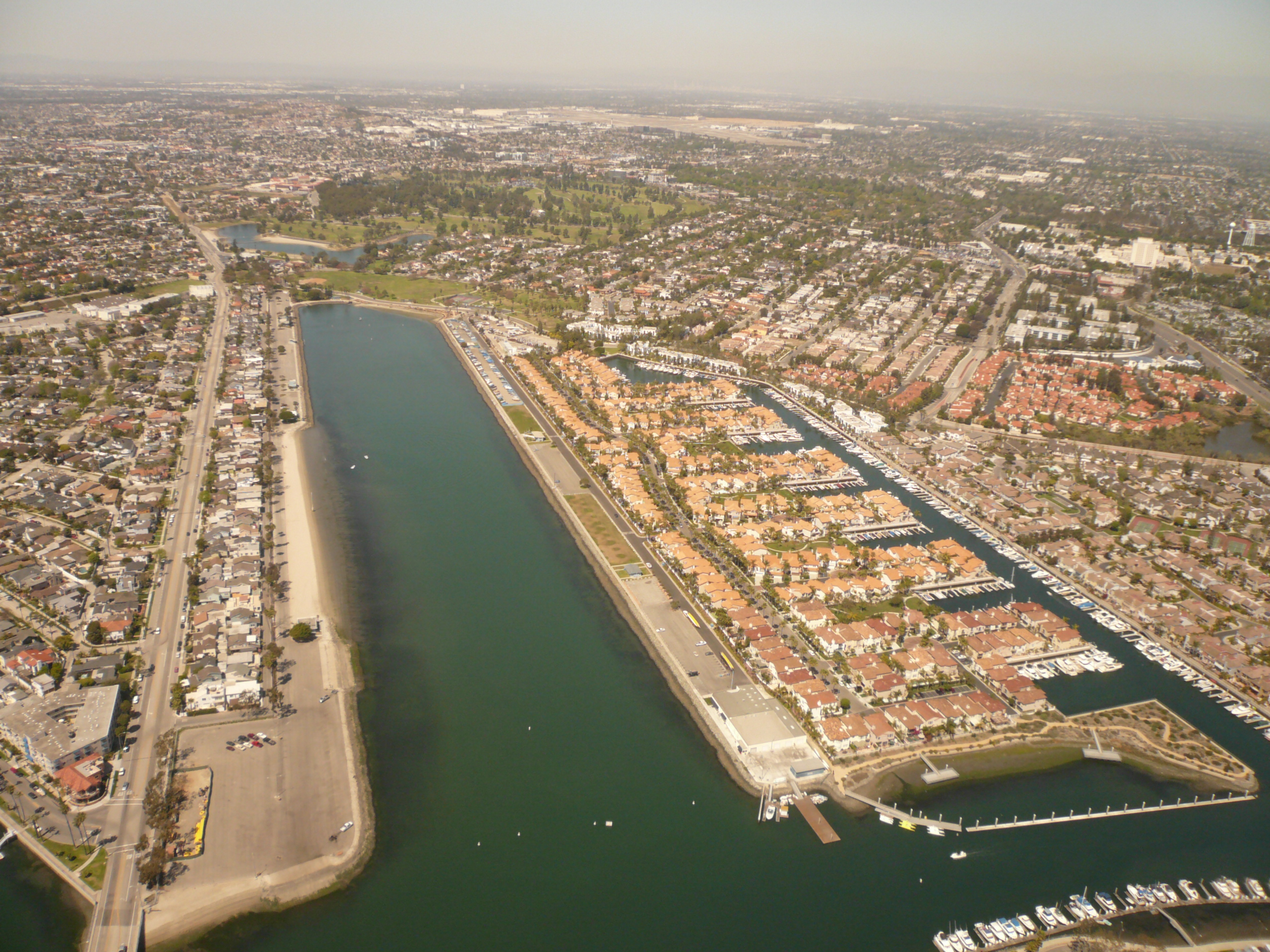
Aerial view of Marine Stadium in Long Beach, California, looking northwest.

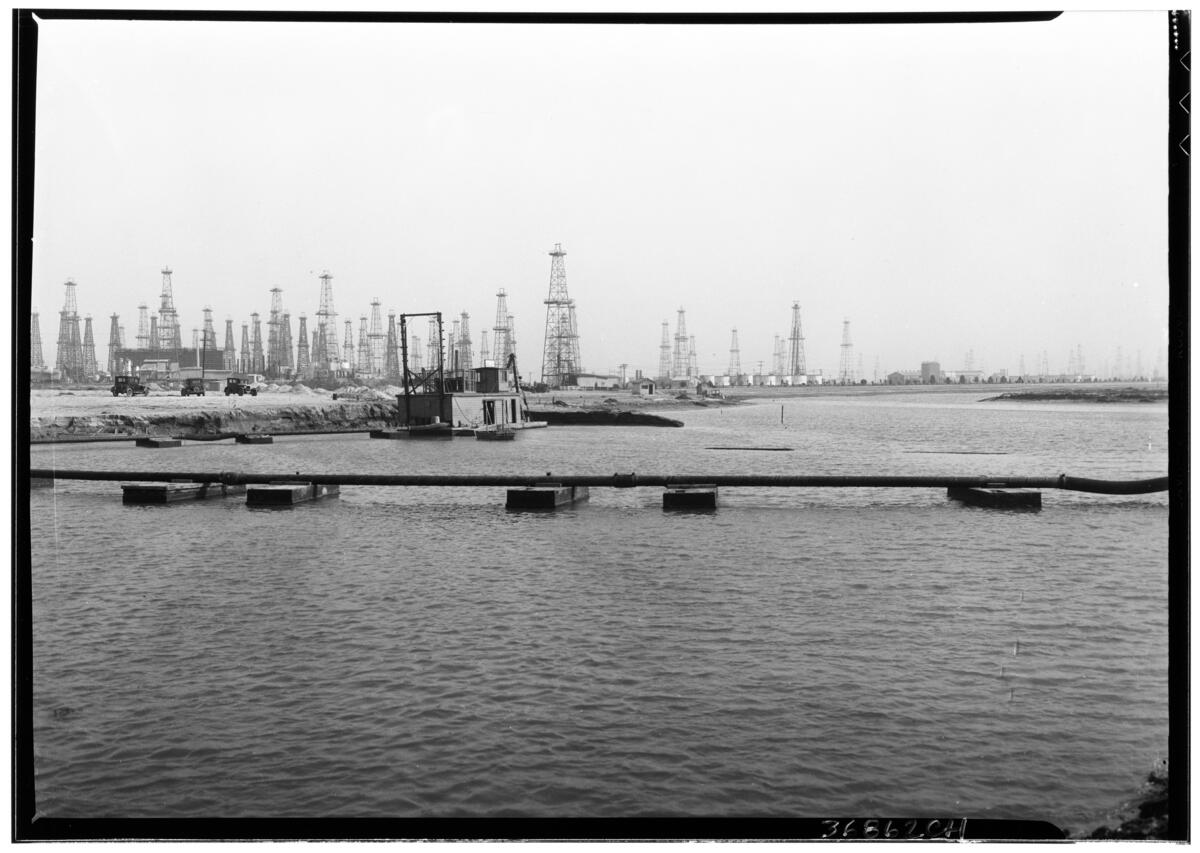
Dredging of Marine Stadium, 1932

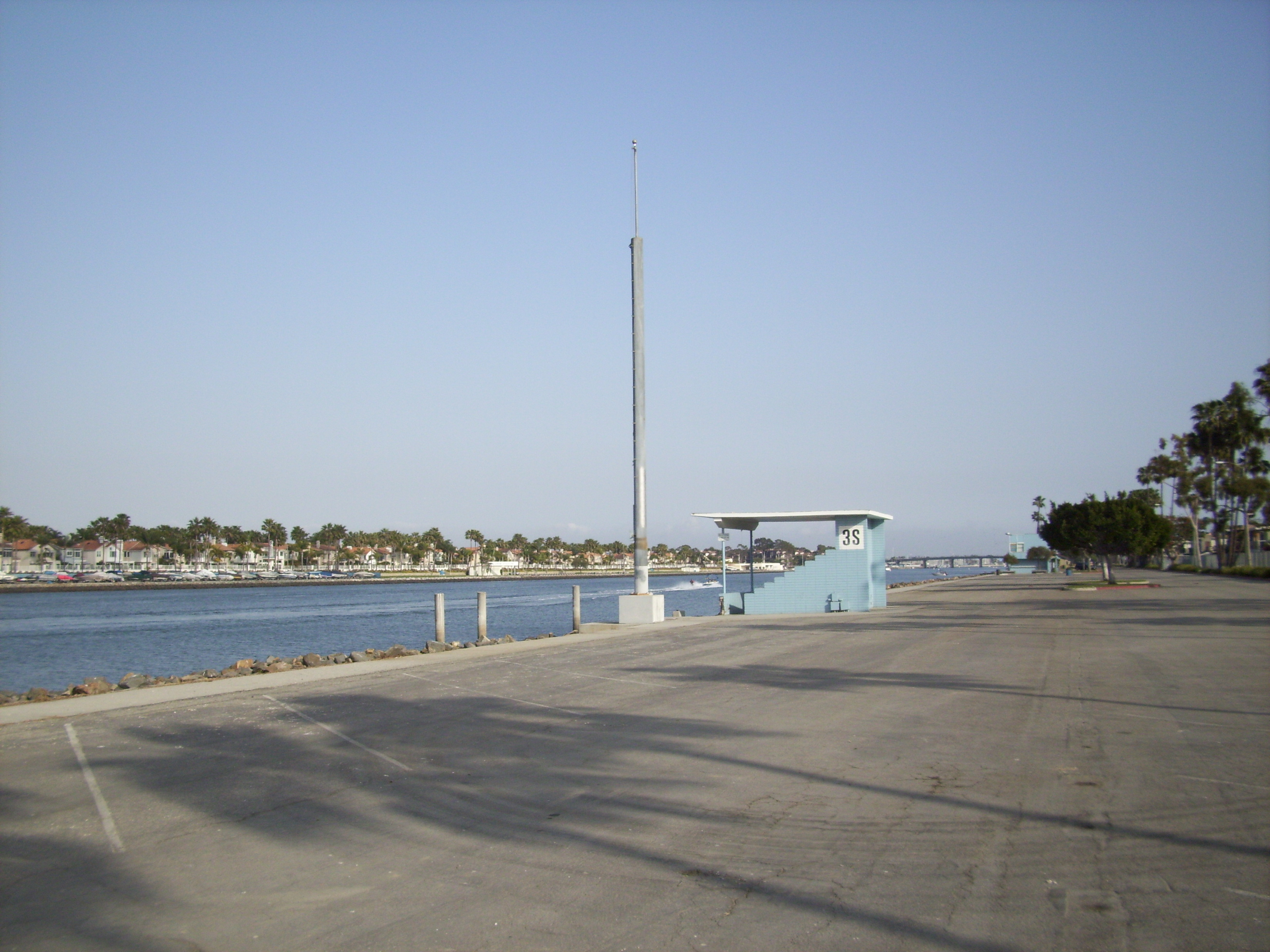
Parking lot

== Olympic and Paralympic Games ==
Long Beach Marine Stadium hosted the rowing competition at the 1932 Summer Olympics, the first time Los Angeles hosted the Olympics. The venue will host rowing and canoe sprint during the 2028 Summer Olympics and Paralympics, but will use a 1500m course instead of the standard 2000m Olympic length due to a bridge spanning the channel built in 1955.

The stadium also hosted the United States rowing trials for the 1968 Summer Olympics that were held in Mexico City.

== Appearances in media ==
- Britain Wins Olympic Rowing Event, 31 Dec 1932, Movietone News
- Motor Boat Race, 1941, Pathé News
