= Recreation Park (Long Beach, California) =

Recreation center in Long Beach, California

Coordinates: 33.77394°N 118.13288°W

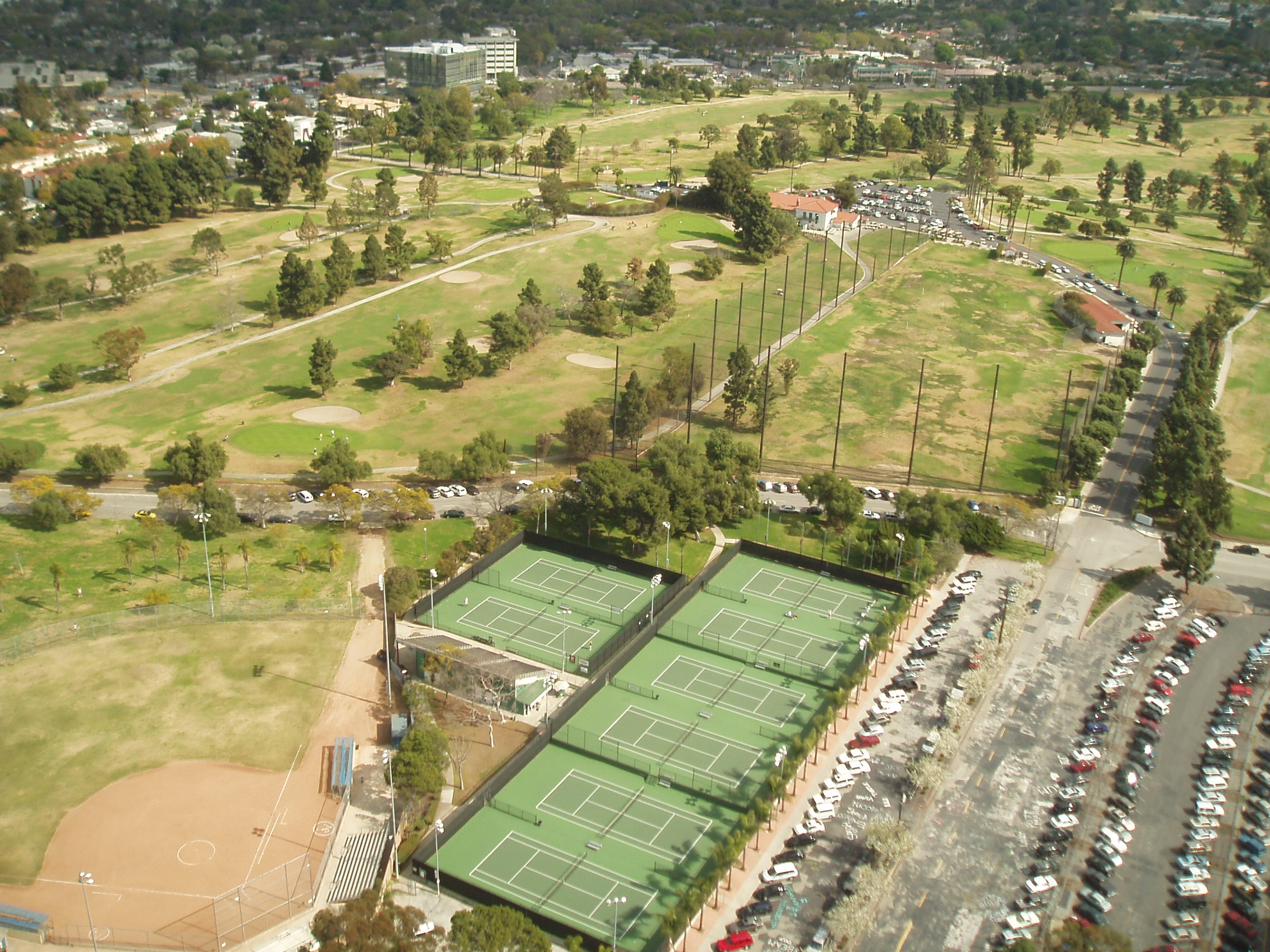
Recreation Park in Long Beach, California.

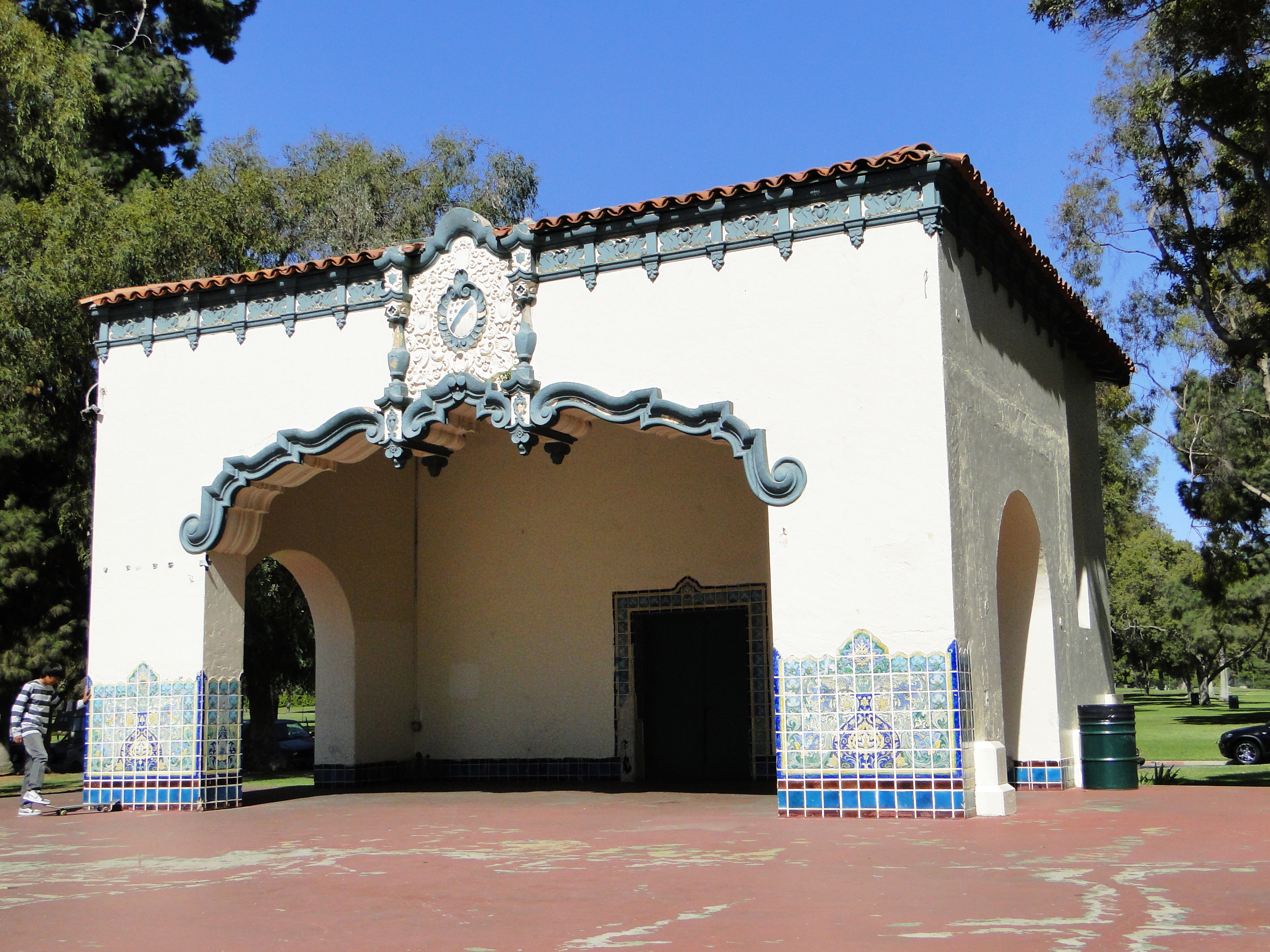
Recreation Park bandshell

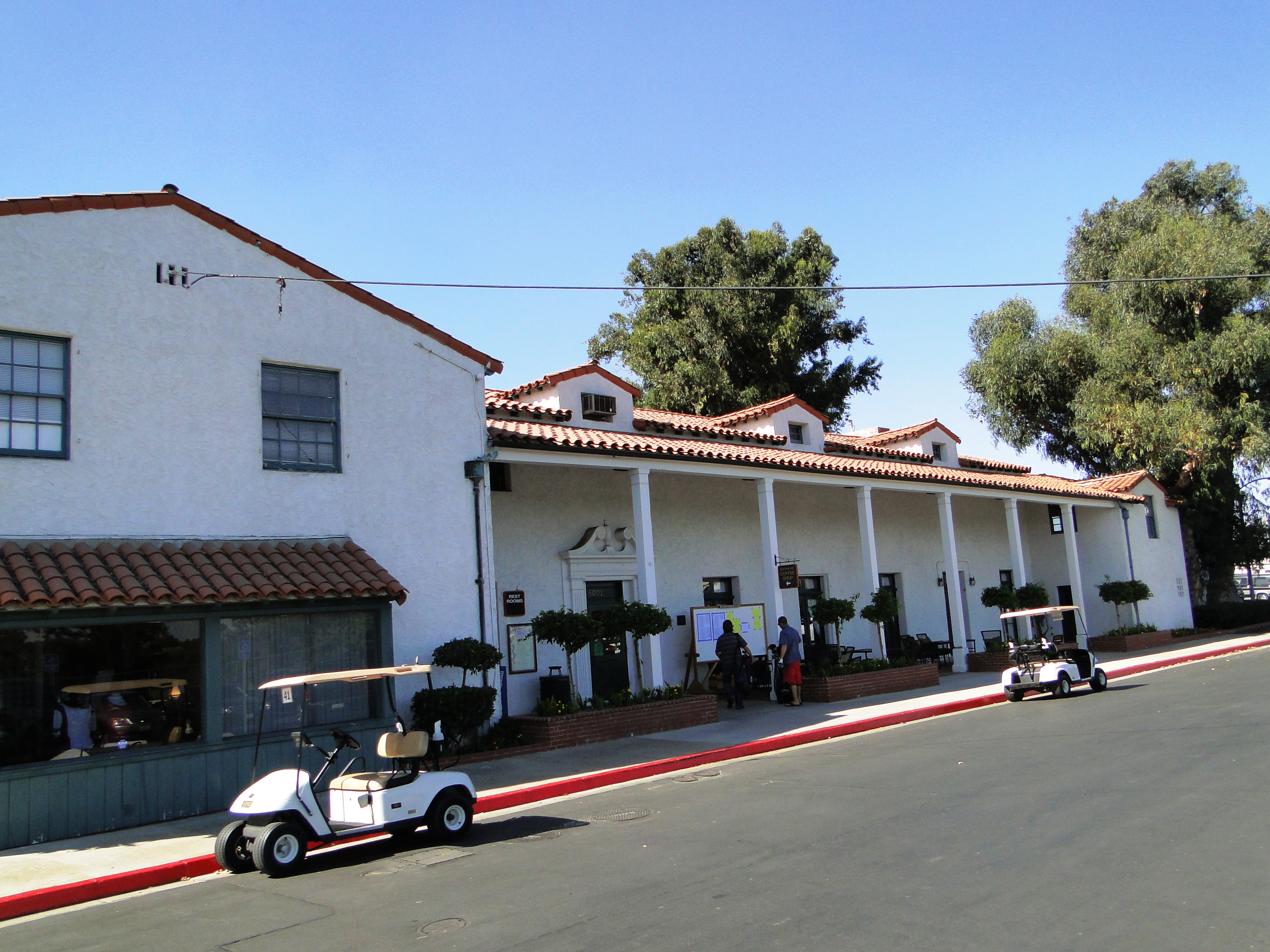
Recreation Park Golf Course Clubhouse

Recreation Park in Long Beach, California is a large 210.9-acre (0.853 km^{2}) recreation center in the southeast section of the city.

The park has a lawn bowling green, dog park, casting pond, and playground. Special facilities include the Billie Jean King Tennis Center, and the Joe Rodgers Field and Blair Field baseball facilities. There are both 18-hole and 9-hole golf courses. The 18-hole course is one of the busiest in the nation.

The park's community center offers a wide range of classes for the community. There is also a reserved picnic site for large picnic groups.

Recreation Park also holds a number of special events sponsored by the City of Long Beach, such as the one for Cinco de Mayo.

South of the 9-hole golf course is the Colorado Lagoon, another city park.

The Recreation Park Bandshell was designated as a City of Long Beach historic landmark in 1991.
