= Alamitos Bay =

Bay in Long Beach and Seal Beach, California

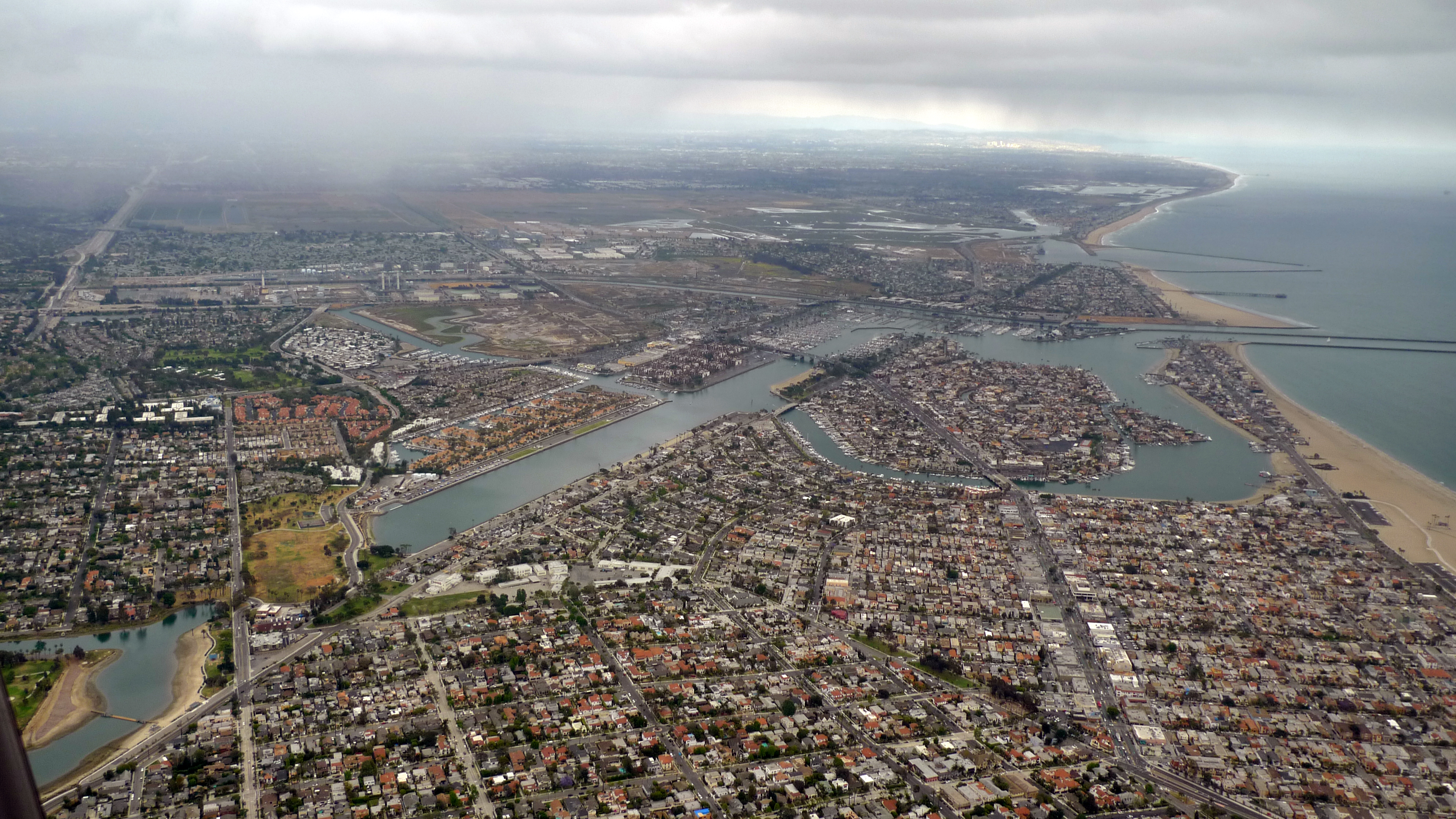
- Alamitos Bay, 2015

- Location within California
- Location: Long Beach, California
- Coordinates: 33°44′59″N 118°07′05″W
- Part of: Pacific Ocean
- Primary inflows: Los Cerritos Channel
- Ocean/sea sources: Pacific Ocean

Alamitos Bay is an inlet of east San Pedro Bay on the Pacific Ocean coast of southern California, United States, between the cities of Long Beach in Los Angeles County and Seal Beach in Orange County, at the outlet of the San Gabriel River. It is near Los Angeles.

The bay is named for the Spanish word for 'little poplars'.

== Geography ==
Alamitos Bay is protected by both the natural sand spit Peninsula and the Long Beach Breakwater. It is divided from the San Gabriel River and Seal Beach by a pair of jetties. The natural geography has been heavily altered by dredging and landfill subsequent to development.

The bay was severely impacted by the 1939 California tropical storm.

== Venues ==
Alamitos Bay contains Marine Stadium, created for Olympic rowing events.

=== Water quality ===
After efforts to clear contaminated sediment and improve circulation, Heal the Bay has re-assessed the water's quality. In a 2020 report, the "Summer Dry Grade" at the 2nd Street Bridge was "B," and at Mother's Beach "A." "Winter Dry Grades" were "C" and "B," respectively. "Wet Weather Grades" were both "F."

The water quality of the bay could be diminished in the future if the pumps of the nearby Alamitos Energy Center are decommissioned. The city is assessing a replacement for these pumps to maintain the bay's water circulation.

== Islands ==
Naples, a collection of three islands, is entirely within Alamitos Bay.

== Gallery ==
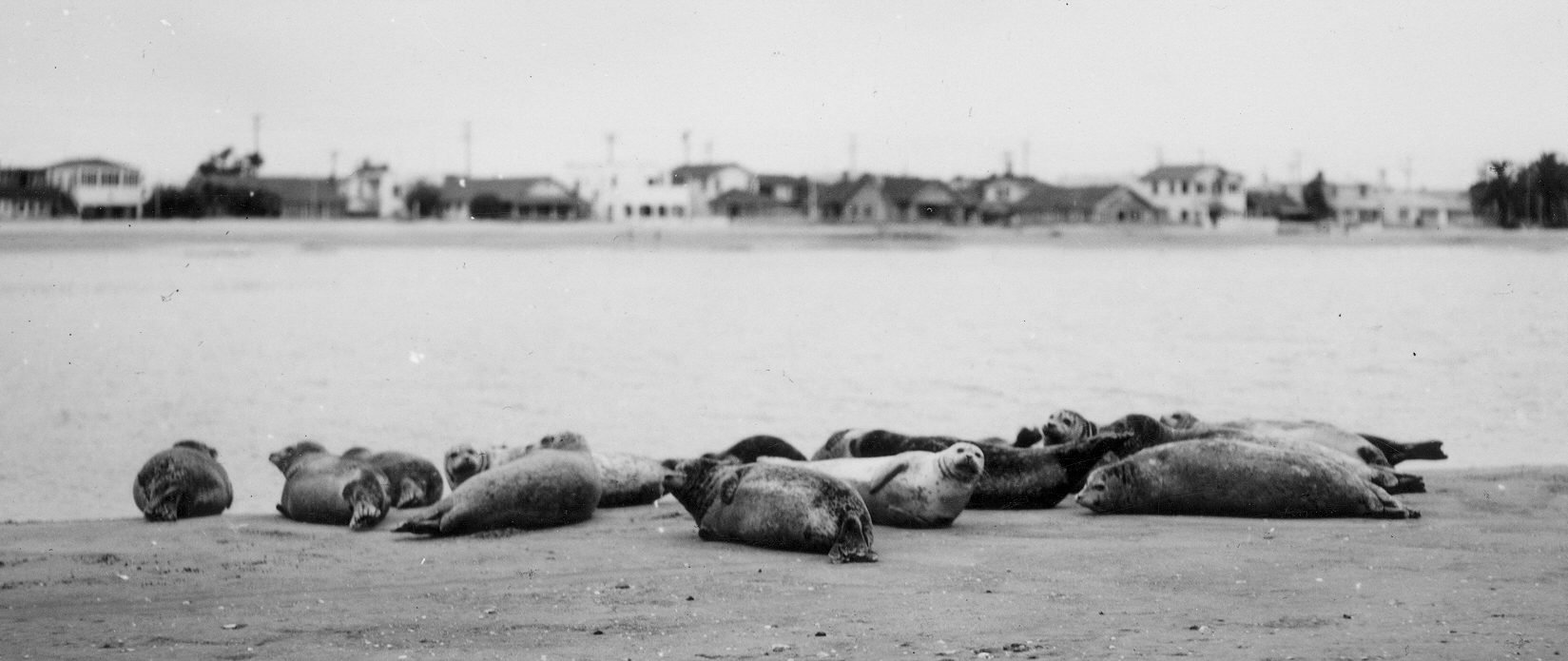
Harbor seals at Alamitos Bay

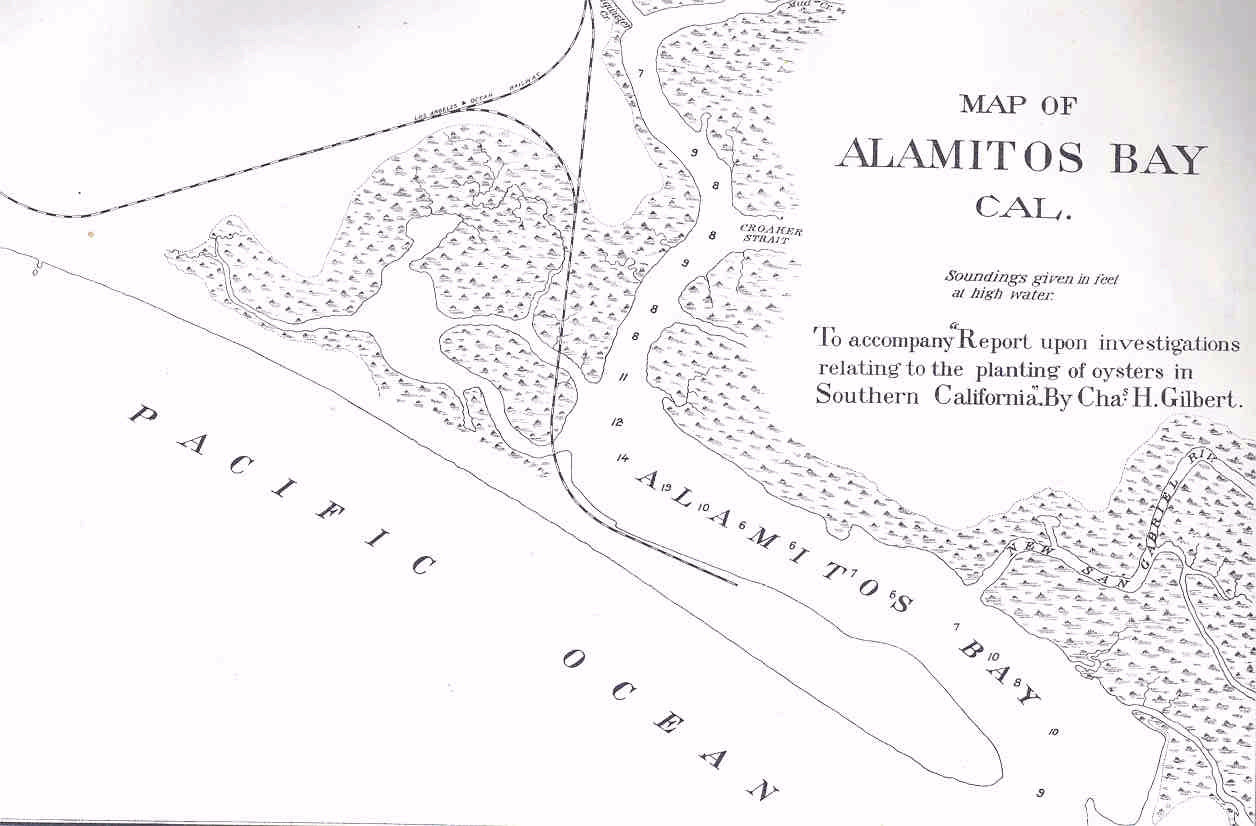
1889 map of Alamitos Bay by Charles Henry Gilbert

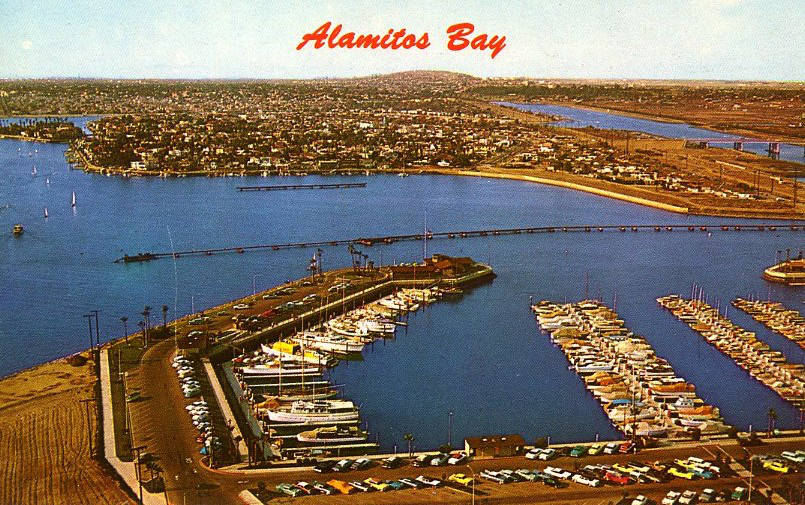
1960 postcard

== See also ==
- Alamitos Bay Yacht Club
- Peninsula, Long Beach, California
- Anaheim Bay
- Los Cerritos Wetlands
- Colorado Lagoon
