= List of cities in Los Angeles County, California =

Map of Los Angeles County Incorporated Areas

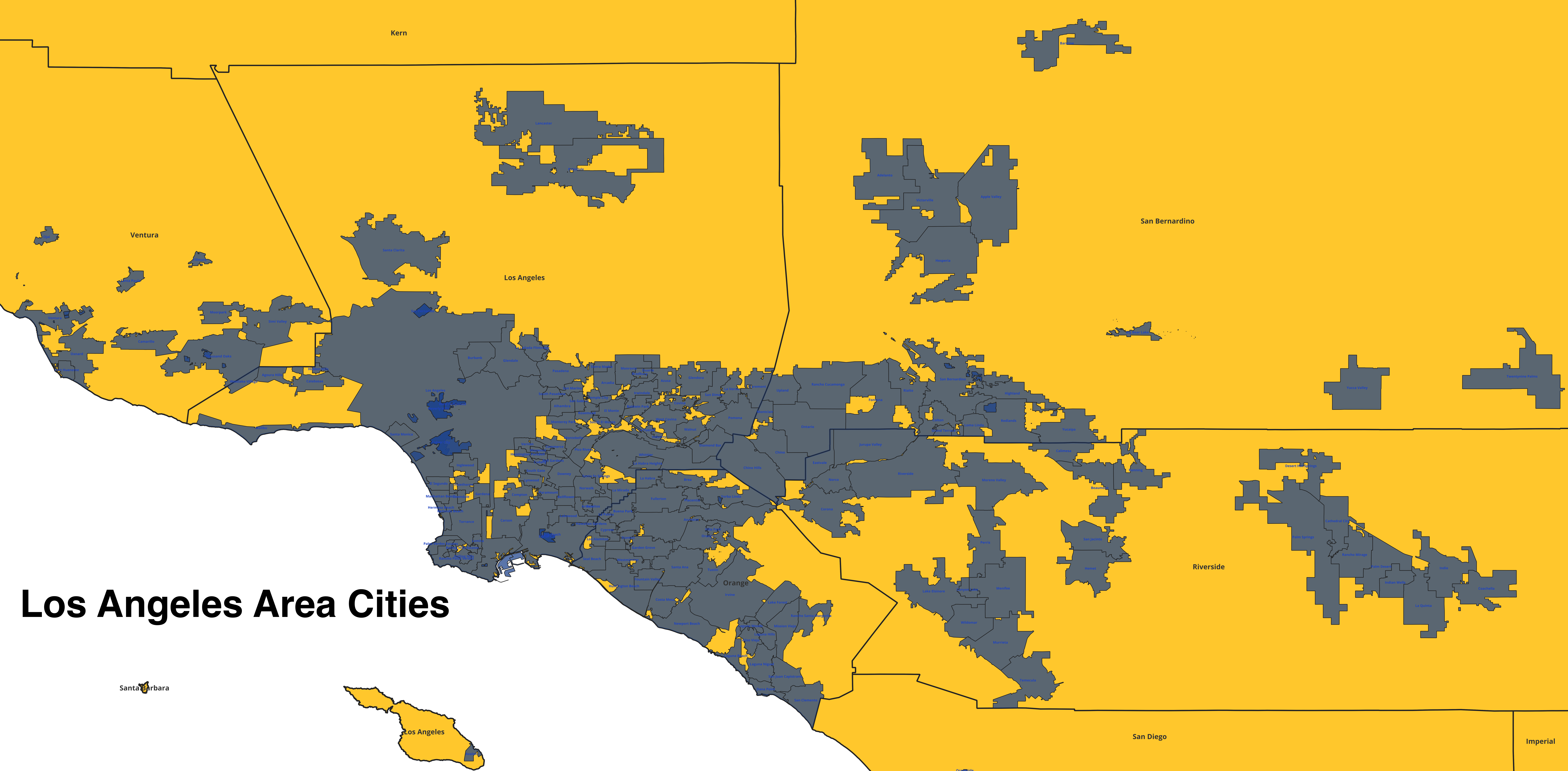
Los Angeles area cities

There are 88 cities in Los Angeles County, California. Each city has a mayor and a city council.

== Cities ==
City	Date incorporated	Population as of (2020 Census)
Agoura Hills	December 8, 1982	20,299
Alhambra	July 11, 1903	82,868
Arcadia	August 5, 1903	56,681
Artesia	May 29, 1959	16,395
Avalon	June 26, 1913	3,460
Azusa	December 29, 1898	50,000
Baldwin Park	January 25, 1956	72,176
Bell	November 7, 1927	33,559
Bell Gardens	August 1, 1961	39,501
Bellflower	September 3, 1957	79,190
Beverly Hills	October 22, 1906	32,701
Bradbury	July 26, 1957	921
Burbank	July 8, 1911	107,337
Calabasas	April 5, 1991	23,241
Carson	February 20, 1968	95,558
Cerritos	April 24, 1956	49,578
Claremont	October 3, 1907	37,266
Commerce	January 28, 1960	12,378
Compton	May 11, 1888	95,740
Covina	August 14, 1901	51,268
Cudahy	November 10, 1960	22,811
Culver City	September 20, 1917	40,779
Diamond Bar	April 18, 1989	55,072
Downey	December 17, 1956	114,355
Duarte	August 22, 1957	21,727
El Monte	November 18, 1912	109,450
El Segundo	January 18, 1917	17,272
Gardena	September 11, 1930	61,027
Glendale	February 15, 1906	196,543
Glendora	November 13, 1911	52,558
Hawaiian Gardens	April 9, 1964	14,149
Hawthorne	July 12, 1922	88,083
Hermosa Beach	January 10, 1907	19,728
Hidden Hills	October 19, 1961	1,725
Huntington Park	September 1, 1906	54,883
Industry	June 18, 1957	264
Inglewood	February 14, 1908	107,762
Irwindale	August 6, 1957	1,472
La Cañada Flintridge	December 8, 1976	20,573
La Habra Heights	December 4, 1978	5,682
La Mirada	March 23, 1960	48,008
La Puente	August 1, 1956	38,062
La Verne	September 11, 1906	31,334
Lakewood	April 16, 1954	82,496
Lancaster	November 22, 1977	173,516
Lawndale	December 28, 1959	31,807
Lomita	June 30, 1964	20,921
Long Beach	December 13, 1897	466,742
Los Angeles	April 4, 1850	3,898,747
Lynwood	July 16, 1921	67,265
Malibu	March 28, 1991	10,654
Manhattan Beach	December 7, 1912	35,506
Maywood	September 2, 1924	25,138
Monrovia	December 15, 1887	37,931
Montebello	October 15, 1920	62,640
Monterey Park	May 29, 1916	61,096
Norwalk	August 26, 1957	102,773
Palmdale	August 24, 1962	169,450
Palos Verdes Estates	December 20, 1939	13,347
Paramount	January 30, 1957	53,733
Pasadena	June 19, 1886	138,699
Pico Rivera	January 29, 1958	62,088
Pomona	January 6, 1888	151,713
Rancho Palos Verdes	September 7, 1973	42,287
Redondo Beach	April 29, 1892	71,576
Rolling Hills	September 18, 1957	1,739
Rolling Hills Estates	January 24, 1957	8,280
Rosemead	August 4, 1959	51,185
San Dimas	August 4, 1960	34,924
San Fernando	August 31, 1911	23,946
San Gabriel	April 24, 1913	39,568
San Marino	April 25, 1913	12,513
Santa Clarita	December 15, 1987	228,673
Santa Fe Springs	May 15, 1957	19,219
Santa Monica	December 9, 1886	93,076
Sierra Madre	February 7, 1907	11,268
Signal Hill	April 22, 1924	11,848
South El Monte	July 30, 1958	19,567
South Gate	January 15, 1923	92,726
South Pasadena	February 29, 1888	26,943
Temple City	May 25, 1960	36,494
Torrance	May 12, 1921	147,067
Vernon	September 22, 1905	222
Walnut	January 19, 1959	28,430
West Covina	February 17, 1923	109,501
West Hollywood	November 29, 1984	35,757
Westlake Village	December 11, 1981	8,029
Whittier	February 28, 1898	87,306

== See also ==
- List of municipalities in California
