= Colorado Lagoon =

Public park in California

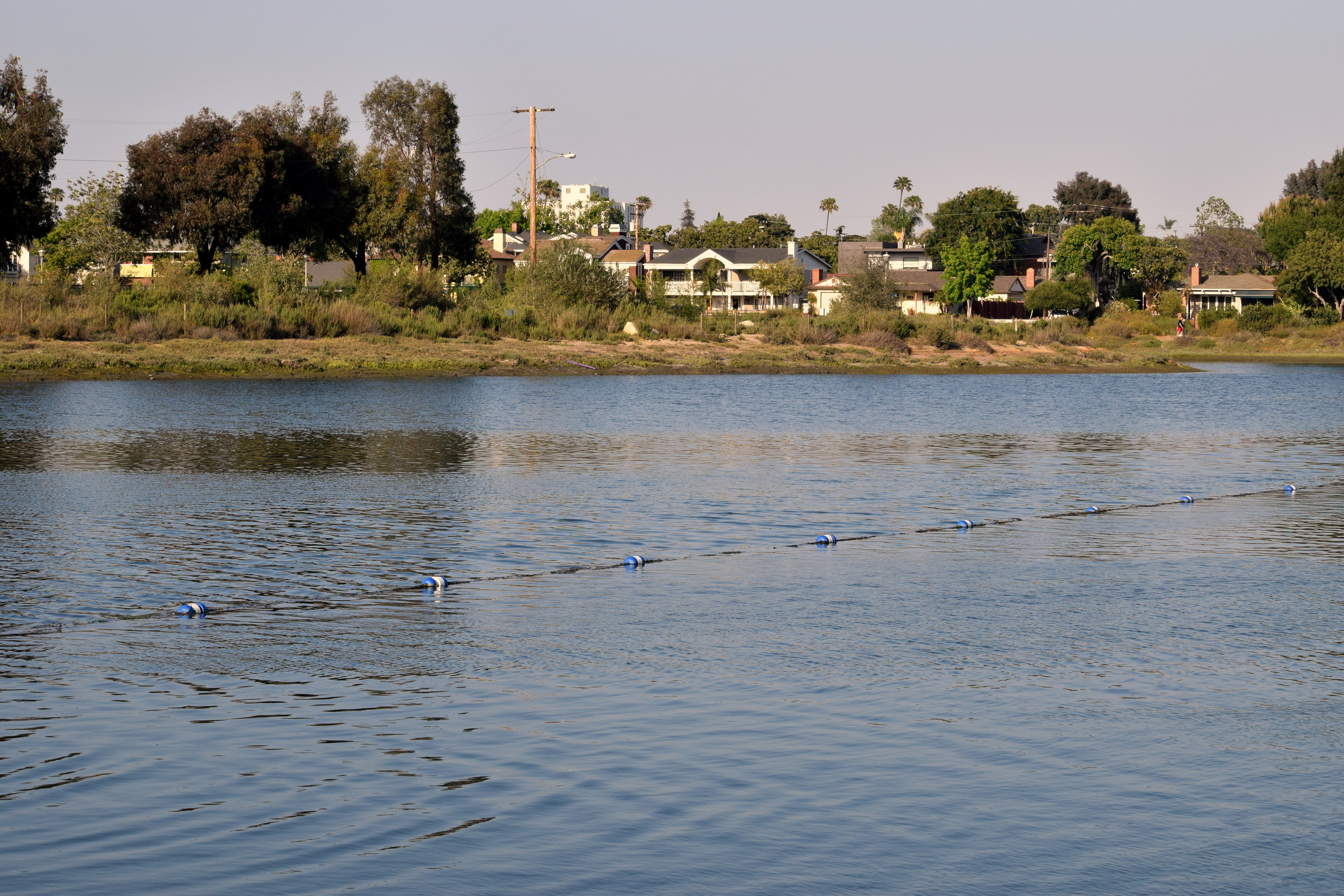
- The lagoon in 2021

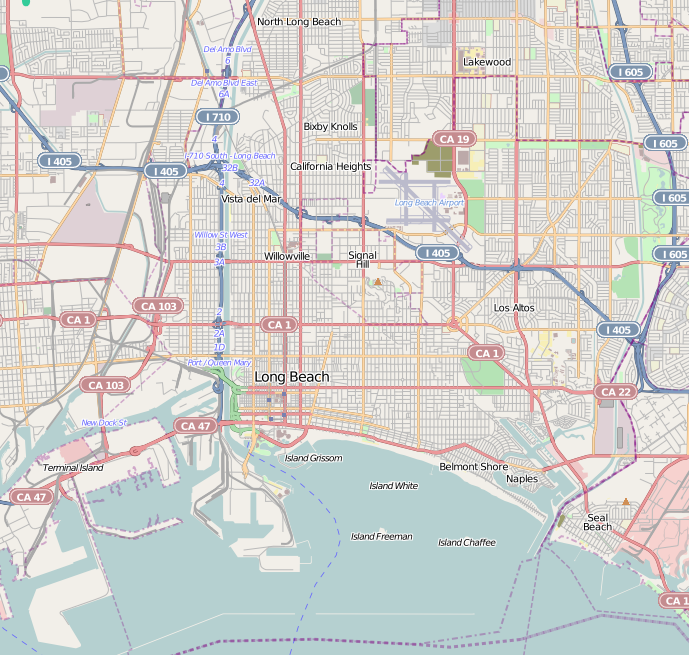
- Location within Long Beach, California Location within the Los Angeles metropolitan area Location within California Location within the United States
- Interactive map of Colorado Lagoon
- Type: Urban
- Location: 5059 E Colorado St, Long Beach, CA 90814
- Coordinates: 33.7719°N 118.1340°W
- Area: 29 acres (12 ha) (park); 18 acres (7.3 ha) (lagoon)
- Established: 1920s
- Owner: City of Long Beach
- Website: www.coloradolagoon.org

Colorado Lagoon is a public park in the Eastside neighborhood of Long Beach, California. Originally part of the Los Cerritos Wetlands, the lagoon was dredged in the 1920s. Construction projects and neglect led to the lagoon becoming polluted, and locals nicknamed it "Polio Pond". In 2009, Los Angeles County began a project to remove contaminated sediment and protect the water from further pollution. The county completed the first phase in 2012 and is scheduled to finish the second phase in 2026 after many delays. The lagoon which the park contains is very biodiverse and is used for swimming and model boating.

== Description ==
The park is 29-acre (12 ha) large and is located in the Eastside neighborhood of Long Beach, California. It contains an 18-acre (7.3 ha) lagoon, one of the only coastal salt marshes left on the West Coast.

=== Features ===
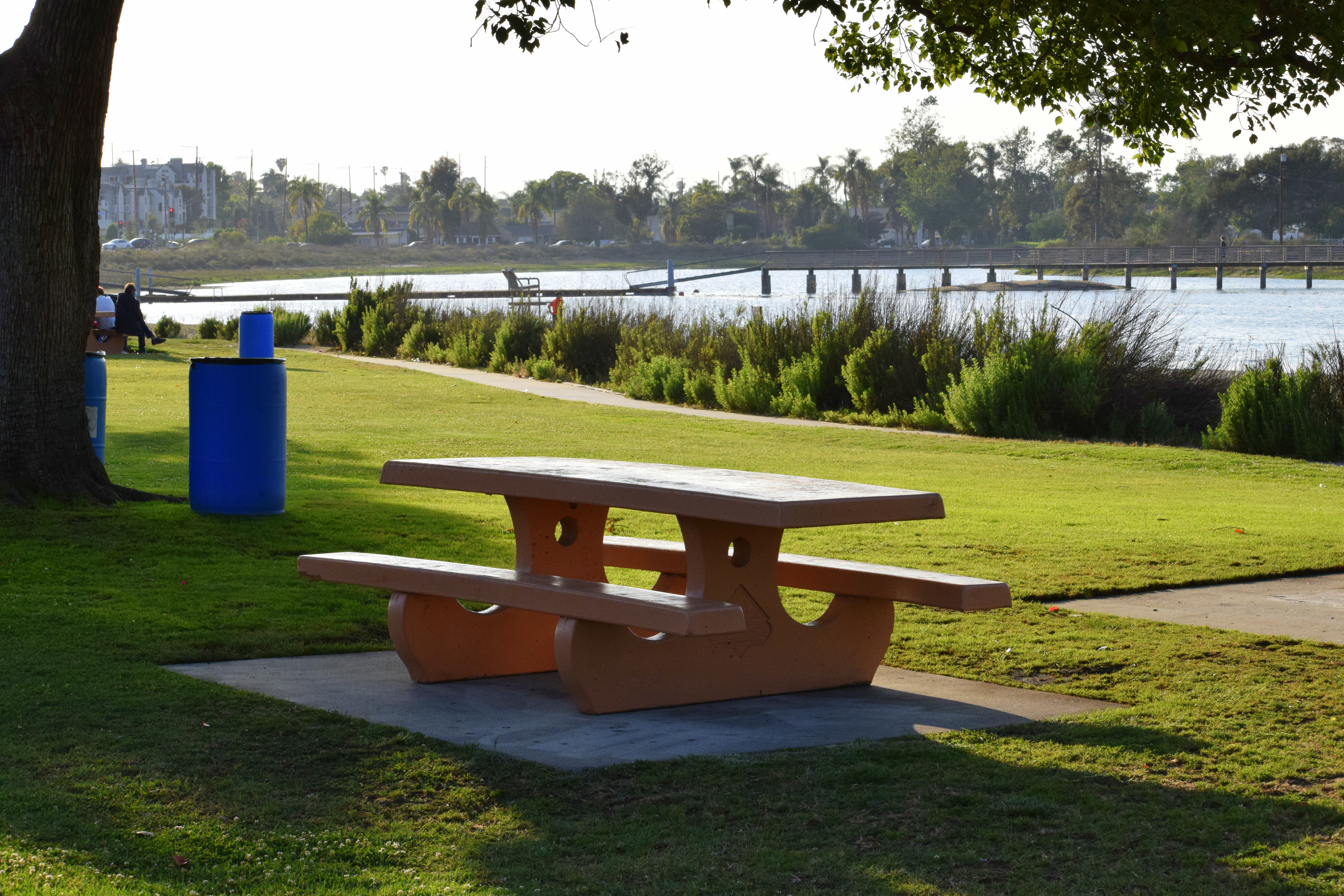
The park's picnic area

The park has a picnic area on turf and play equipment. The swimming beach is fairly sandy and parking can be found on the north and south sides. A Wetland and Marine Science Education Center is located nearby in a formerly abandoned snack shack and a model boat shop is also in operation. Roughly half of the park's area is land. In the early-to-mid-20th century, the park was used for fishing, swimming, sailing, and picking.

=== Wildlife ===
Various species of jellyfish, stingrays, and fish, such as round stingray, yellowfin croaker, California halibut, and grey smooth-hound inhabit the lagoon's waters. Moon jellies commonly wash up onto its beaches. A large seagrass ecosystem (primarily of Zostera marina) exists underwater as well. A variety of birds (Note: Including grey plover, brown pelican, California gull, double-crested cormorant, great blue heron, great egret, American coot, red-breasted merganser, snowy egret, tricolored heron, spotted sandpiper, western sandpiper, least sandpiper, Canada goose, long-billed curlew, osprey, northern rough-winged swallow, golden-crowned sparrow, western kingbird, swinhoe's white-eye, killdeer, red-tailed hawk, Cooper's hawk, and red-shouldered hawk.) can also be commonly found at the park and bees and butterflies are a frequent sight. Striped shore crabs live on the shores. Borders of the water area contain plants of the coastal sage scrub plant community (Note: Such as toyon, Menzies' goldenbush, California sunflower, dune buckwheat, giant coreopsis, hollowleaf annual lupine, spotted locoweed, coastal tidytips, common deerweed, desert wishbone-bush, beach suncup, round-tooth snake-lily, California poppy, California brittlebush, and purple Chinese houses.) but change to a salt marsh or mudflat habitat as it gets closer to the water. The rest of the park is covered in turf.

== History ==
The area was formerly a salt marsh in the Los Cerritos Wetlands, part of the San Gabriel River delta and was inhabited by the Tongva people. It was dredged in the 1920s to allow for recreational rowing. The park was formerly a part of Recreation Park; the city bought the park in 1923 from the San Gabriel River Improvement Company, one of Henry E. Huntington's holdings, and the Alamitos Land Company. The lagoon originally opened up into Alamitos Bay, but a bulkhead and tide gates were built in 1932 that made Colorado Street able to cross the body of water. The tide gates allowed for the lagoon's water level to be adjusted for diving events. A three-story diving platform was installed and was used in the trials for diving at the 1932 Summer Olympics. It continued to be used until its removal in the 1950s. The park became less popular for swimming in the 1960s after the channel emptying into Alamitos Bay was turned into a 900 ft (270 m)-long tunnel that was to be used for a canceled freeway. After the lagoon become more polluted, locals began to dub it "Polio Pond". In 1970, the site that the canceled freeway was to originally occupy was turned into Marina Vista Park.

Water quality continued to decrease over the next thirty years, as the eleven storm drains emptied into the lagoon and the water was not drained as often. This deterioration continued until 2002, when the State of California designated the lagoon as an "impaired water body." The Friends of Colorado Lagoon organization was formed in 1998 to improve the water quality of the lagoon. The California Coastal Conservancy allocated some funds to conduct a study to see how effective and possible a restoration would be for the park in 2005. The organization also held educational programs in the Wetlands and Marine Science Education Center starting in 2006.

=== Restoration ===
A restoration was approved by the Long Beach City Council in 2008, and the project's first phase began in 2009, under a state-funded grant. In October 2009, Los Angeles County additionally funded a project to divert 40% of stormwater that would have gone into the lagoon to Long Beach Marine Stadium. Called the Termino Storm Drain Project, it was completed in October 2011, costing $25 million. Another problem was the breakwater in San Pedro Bay, which traps some contamination. The California State Water Resources Control Board granted the city $5.1 million in 2011 to remove sediment, plant native species near the lagoon, eradicate invasive ones like cheeseweed, and install devices reducing pollution, amongst other upgrades.

The lagoon was officially reopened to the public on August 25, 2012, in a ribbon-cutting ceremony. After the restoration, the lagoon's water quality improved drastically, as tests by Heal the Bay in 2014 revealed an A grade, as opposed to an F grade in 2007. Also in 2014, the American Society of Landscape Architects recognized Colorado Lagoon for its restoration.

=== Channel to Marine Stadium ===
A construction project to link the lagoon with Marine Stadium was approved in 2019. It involved carving a 12 ft (3.7 m)-deep channel through Marina Vista Park and would increase the biodiversity of species in the lagoon and allow for better water circulation. This channel will also be used to replace the underground tunnel and culvert built in the 1960s.

Construction began in 2020 when non-native trees were removed from the park, although the COVID-19 pandemic and supply chain disruptions delayed any parts of the channel being built until December 2022. In 2021, the city initially estimated the project's cost to be $26.3 million, but once they found a contractor in November 2022 it increased to $32.5 million. It was estimated to be completed in 2024, a change from its original ending date of 2022. In 2024, it was delayed again to 2025 and then to 2026.

In October 2024, two construction workers who were digging out the channel were fired when construction was forced to be stopped after they filed a complaint with the South Coast Air Quality Management District, the California Department of Toxic Substances Control, and the California Division of Occupational Safety and Health. They claimed that they were frequently digging up asbestos and that, when they reported it to their supervisor at Reyes Construction, they were told to "hide and bury asbestos without notifying the city or third-party experts." The city and its third-party experts claimed that they did not have evidence that the asbestos provided a health risk, and construction continued the following month in November.
