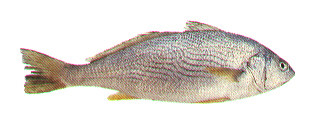
- Yellowfin drum Umbrina roncador

Scientific classification
- Kingdom: Animalia
- Phylum: Chordata
- Class: Actinopterygii
- Order: Acanthuriformes
- Family: Sciaenidae
- Genus: Umbrina; Cuvier, 1817

Type species
- Sciaena cirrosa Linnaeus, 1758

Species
- See text

Synonyms
- Asperina Ostroumoff, 1896; Attilus Gistel, 1848

= Umbrina =

Genus of fishes

Umbrina is a genus of fish from the croaker family Sciaenidae. The genus contains 17 species occurring in tropical and warm temperate waters of the Atlantic, the Mediterranean, the Western Indian Ocean and the eastern Pacific.

== Taxonomy ==
Umbrina was first proposed as a genus in 1817 by the French zoologist Georges Cuvier as a monospecific genus with its only species being Sciaena cirrosa. S. cirrosa had been described by Carl Linnaeus in the 10th edition of the Systema Naturae published in 1758 and its type locality was given as the Mediterranean Sea and eastern Atlantic. Some workers have placed this genus in the subfamily Sciaeninae. However, the 5th edition of Fishes of the World does not recognise tribes or subfamilies within the Sciaenidae which it places in the order Acanthuriformes.

== Etymology ==
The name of the genus, Umbrina, is a diminutive of umbra meaning "shade", this was a name used by early naturalists for drums and croakers, in a similar way to scion or Sciaena.

== Species ==
Currently, 17 species are recognized in the genus:

- Umbrina analis Günther, 1868 (Longspine drum)
- Umbrina broussonnetii Cuvier, 1830 (Striped drum)
- Umbrina bussingi López S., 1980 (Bussing's drum)
- Umbrina canariensis Valenciennes, 1843 (Canary drum)
- Umbrina canosai Berg, 1895 (Argentine croaker)
- Umbrina cirrosa (Linnaeus, 1758) (Shi drum)
- Umbrina coroides Cuvier, 1830 (Sand drum)
- Umbrina dorsalis Gill, 1862 (Longfin drum)
- Umbrina galapagorum Steindachner, 1878 (Galápagos drum)
- Umbrina imberbis Günther, 1873
- Umbrina milliae Miller, 1971
- Umbrina reedi Günther, 1880
- Umbrina roncador Jordan & Gilbert, 1882 (Yellowfin drum)
- Umbrina ronchus Valenciennes, 1843 (Fusca drum)
- Umbrina steindachneri Cadenat 1951 (Steindachner's drum)
- Umbrina wintersteeni Walker & Radford, 1992 (Wintersteen drum)
- Umbrina xanti Gill, 1862 (Polla drum)

== Description ==
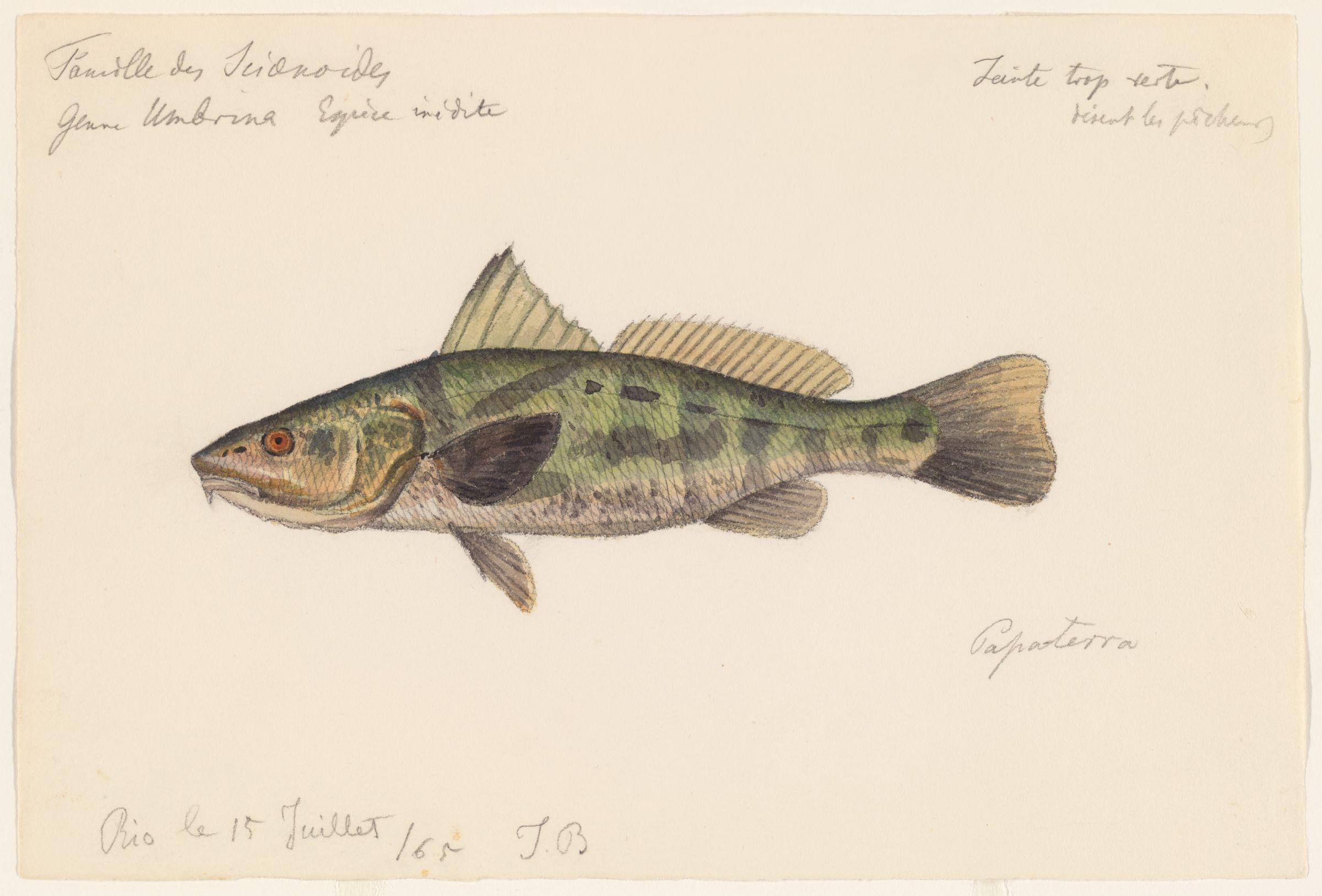
An 1865 watercolor umbrina painting by Jacques Burkhardt.

The species of the genus Umbrina are elongated, laterally compressed fishes with a rounded belly. The head is lower than the relatively high back. The mouth is small and set below the midline with a short, there is a short, stocky barbel on the chin with a pore at the end and two pores om wither side of the base. The eye is medium-sized and the diameter is a quarter of the length of the head. The teeth sit in two rows per jaw, of which the outer is larger in the upper jaw. The edge of the scales are finely serrated. The body is dark brown or silver-colored and has opaque stripes or vertical bars. The first dorsal fin is short and has ten thin hard rays. The second, long spine has 25 to 30 soft rays. The small anal fin has two hard and five to eight soft rays.
