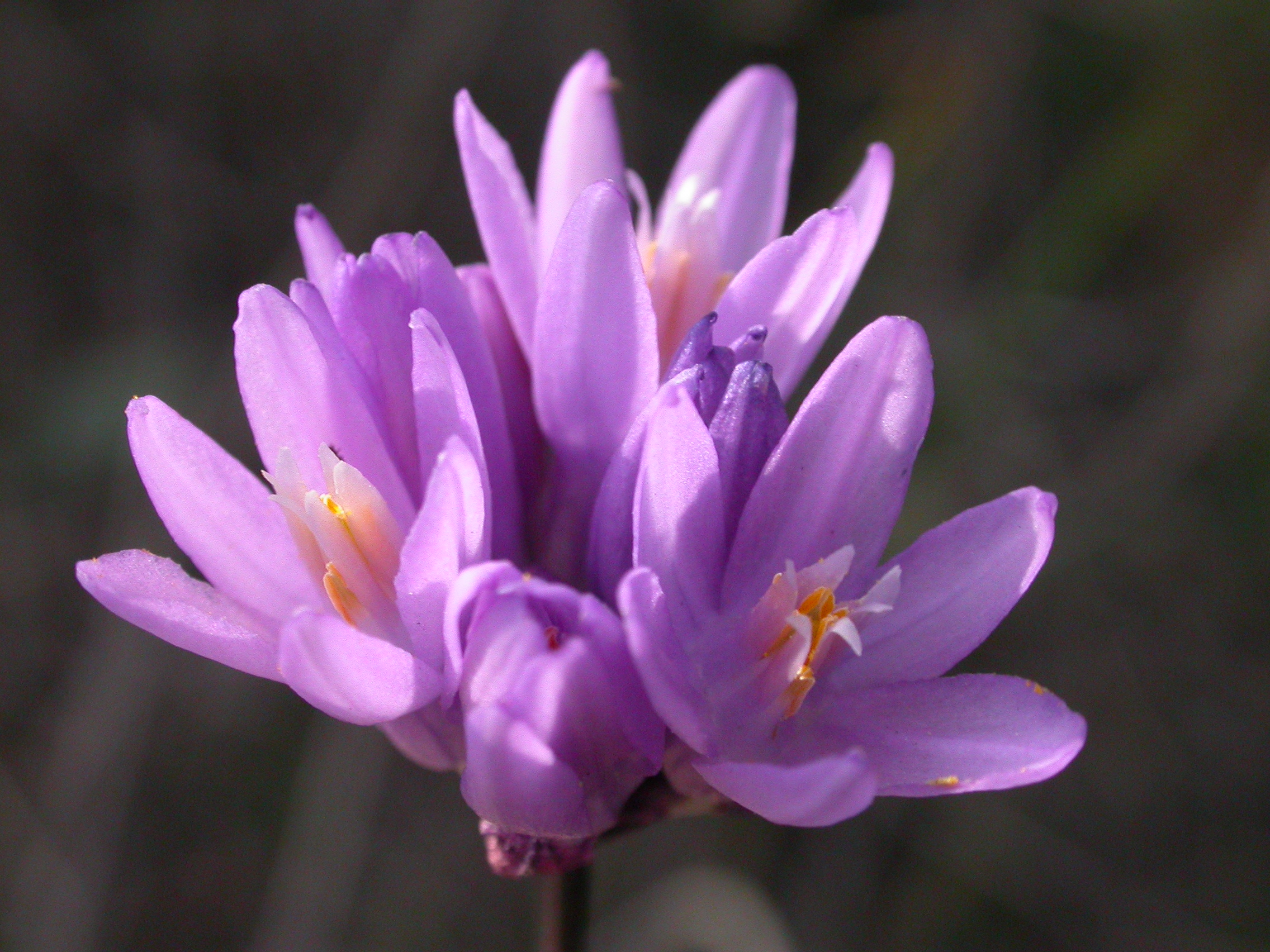

Conservation status
- Secure (NatureServe)

Scientific classification
- Kingdom: Plantae
- Clade: Tracheophytes
- Clade: Angiosperms
- Clade: Monocots
- Order: Asparagales
- Family: Asparagaceae
- Subfamily: Brodiaeoideae
- Genus: Dipterostemon; Rydb.
- Species: D. capitatus

Binomial name
- Dipterostemon capitatus (Benth.) Rydb.

Synonyms
- Brodiaea capitata Benth.; Dichelostemma pulchellum var. capitatum (Benth.) Reveal; Dichelostemma capitatum (Benth.) Alph.Wood; Hookera capitata (Benth.) Kuntze; Milla capitata (Benth.) Baker

= Dipterostemon =

Species of flowering plant

Dipterostemon is a monotypic genus of flowering plants in the family Asparagaceae. Its only species is Dipterostemon capitatus, synonym Dichelostemma capitatum, known by the common names blue dicks, wild hyacinth, purplehead and brodiaea (alternately spelled brodiea and brodeia), native to the Western United States (particularly Arizona, California, Oregon, Utah, and New Mexico) and northwest Mexico.

== Description ==
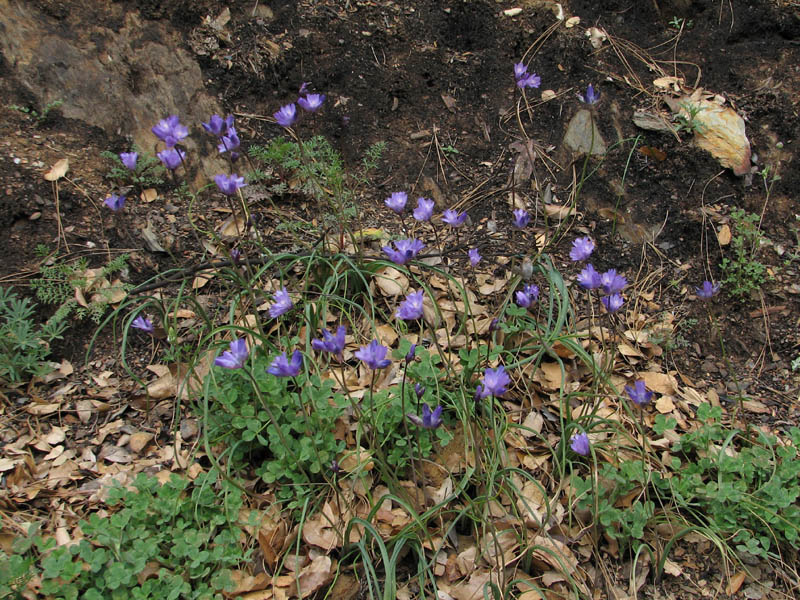
Dipterostemon capitatus subsp. capitatus is a variable ecotype. This was photographed from the northern Sierra Nevadas

Dipterostemon capitatus is an herbaceous perennial growing from an underground corm to a height of as much as 60 cm (24 in). It has 2–3 leaves which are 10–40 cm (3.9–15.7 in) long. The inflorescence is head- or umbel-like, and dense. It usually contains 2 to 15 flowers, which have a blue, blue-purple, pink-purple, or white perianth. The flower tube is 3–12 mm and is narrowly cylindrical to campanulate. Flowers have six fertile stamens, deeply notched, lanceolate, white, angled inward, slightly reflexed at tip, with outer filaments wider at the base. It has a twisted and fleshy peduncle, a set of membranous, petal-like stamen appendages around the anthers, and angular black seeds. It reproduces from seed and vegetative means in the form of cormlets. The cormlets are attached to the parent corm by stolons and are sessile, produced in the axils of the old leaf bases on the mature corm. Plants thrive in open disturbed environments, and are a common post-fire succession species in chaparral. Flowering peaks in March.

D. capitatus occurs from sea level up to 2,300 metres (7,550 ft). It inhabits a wide variety of plant communities, including vernal pools, valley grassland, scrub, coniferous forests, and open woodlands. It seems not to colonize after fire by seed, but rather by cormlets. After fire, plants are exposed to unshaded environments with little brush competition, and vigorously flower in open environments with increased soil nutrients.

Grasslands that have been burned may exhibit thousands of plants where none have appeared in recent years. Corms may sit for a decade or more and wait for fire or other favorable environmental conditions before breaking ground. Suppression of fire may cause increased shade and plant competition and decrease population numbers of D. capitatus.

== Taxonomy ==
The species was first described by George Bentham in 1857 as Brodiaea capitata. In 1868, Alphonso Wood moved it to the genus Dichelostemma as Dichelostemma capitatum. In 1912, Per Axel Rydberg moved it to Dipterostemon as Dipterostemon capitatus. Most sources continued to use Wood's placement in Dichelostemma, including the Flora of North America, which however noted that it was "quite distinct from other species in the genus" and that it was perhaps "best treated as its own genus". In 2017, restoration of Dipterostemon as a monotypic genus was proposed. This has been accepted by sources such as Plants of the World Online and the Jepson Flora Project.

=== Subspecies ===
Three subspecies are accepted:

- Dipterostemon capitatus subsp. capitatus
- Dipterostemon capitatus subsp. lacuna-vernalis (L.W.Lenz) R.E.Preston
- Dipterostemon capitatus subsp. pauciflorus (Torr.) R.E.Preston (common name - desert hyacinth)

== Uses ==
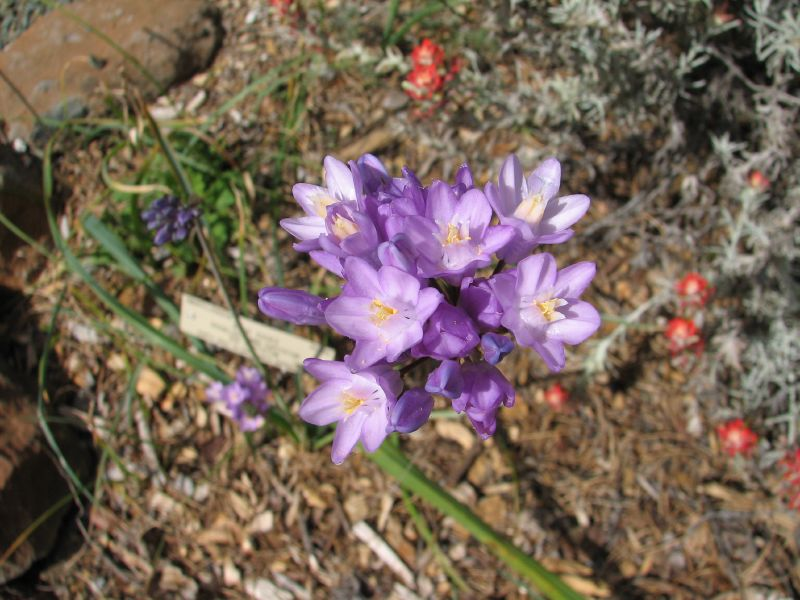
D. capitatus subsp. capitatus

Corms have been gathered by Native Americans in California, parts of the Great Basin, and the Southwest. These corms were an important starch source in their diet. California tribes dug and continue to dig the corms before flowering, during flowering, or after seeding depending on the tribe and individual family. Traditional gathering sites were visited annually, and there were gathering tracts with different kinds of corms and bulbs owned and maintained by particular families.

Corms are eaten by animals such as black bears, mule deer, non-native wild pigs, rabbits, and pocket gophers. As some of the corms are eaten, others are dispersed. The animals detach the cormlets, which aerates the soil, prepares the seedbed, thins the plant population, and leaves some cormlets behind. Once separated, corms may take less time to reach flowering size.

Although slow to flowering starting from seeds, it is sometimes used in horticulture. The flowers mix well in native beds, especially when contrasted against other California native species such as California poppies (Eschscholzia californica). With patience and proper care, these plants can become quite dramatic come spring.

== Management ==
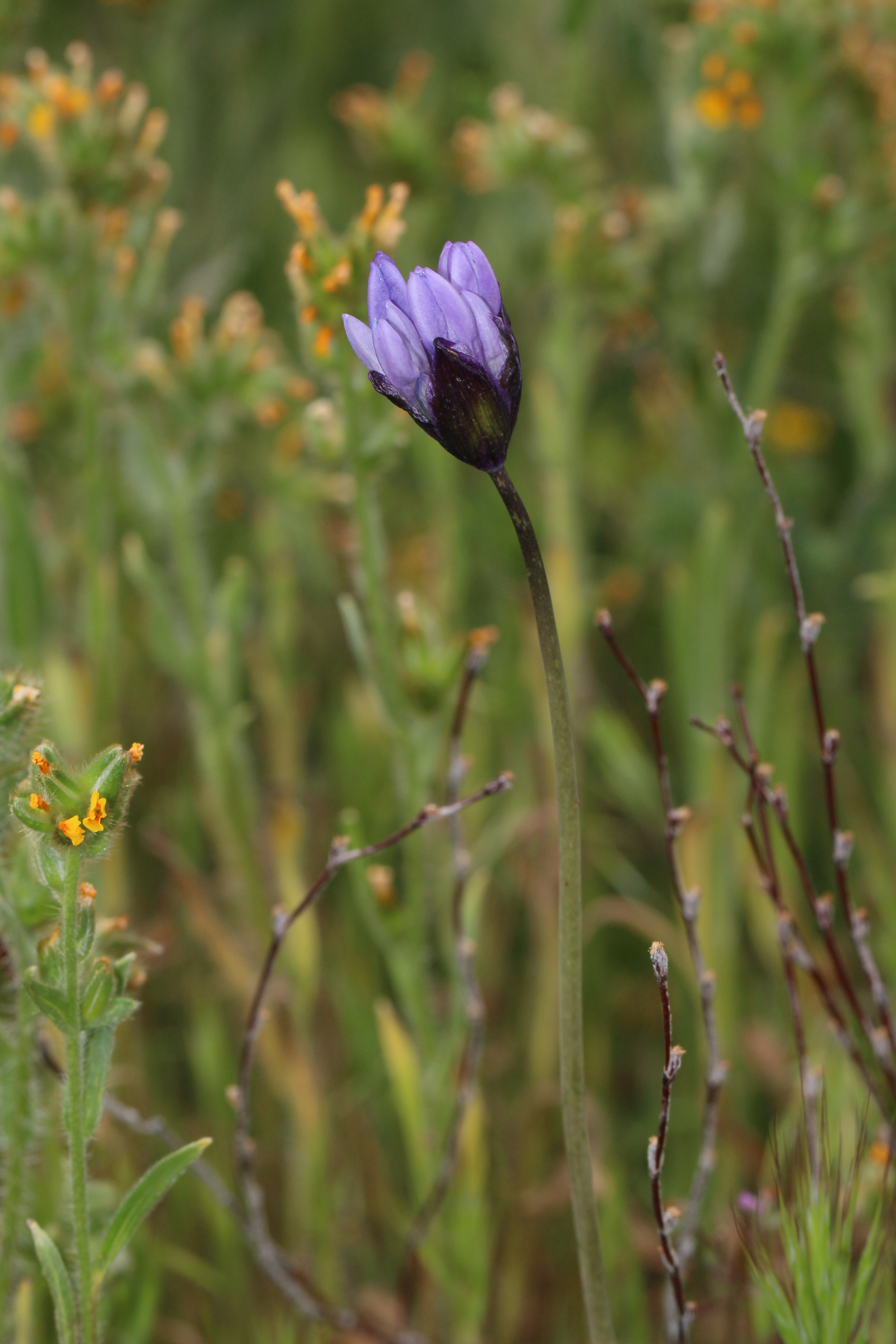
Growing in the Antelope Valley California Poppy Reserve

Indigenous people had several different types of management activities to ensure future corm production at gathering sites:

1. breaking off cormlets from the harvested parent corms and replanting them
2. sparing whole plants
3. harvesting the corms after plants have gone to seed and dumping the seeds in the hole
4. burning areas
5. irrigation

Periodic digging and thinning of the corms or separating the cormlets, and replanting them may have enhanced plant numbers and densities. Digging corms acts as a form of tillage, which will increase the size of the gathering tract, aerate the soil, lower weed competition, and prepare the seedbed to increase seed germination rates. Dipterostemon capitatus populations require periodic disturbance to maintain and increase their populations; therefore, indigenous harvesting regimes may help maintain populations. Populations that become overcrowded and show reduced vigor can be divided and separated.

== Propagation ==
Seeds sown in the fall usually readily germinate and do not need special treatment. If planting seeds, they will take several years to reach flowering size. Propagation by corms is much easier.
