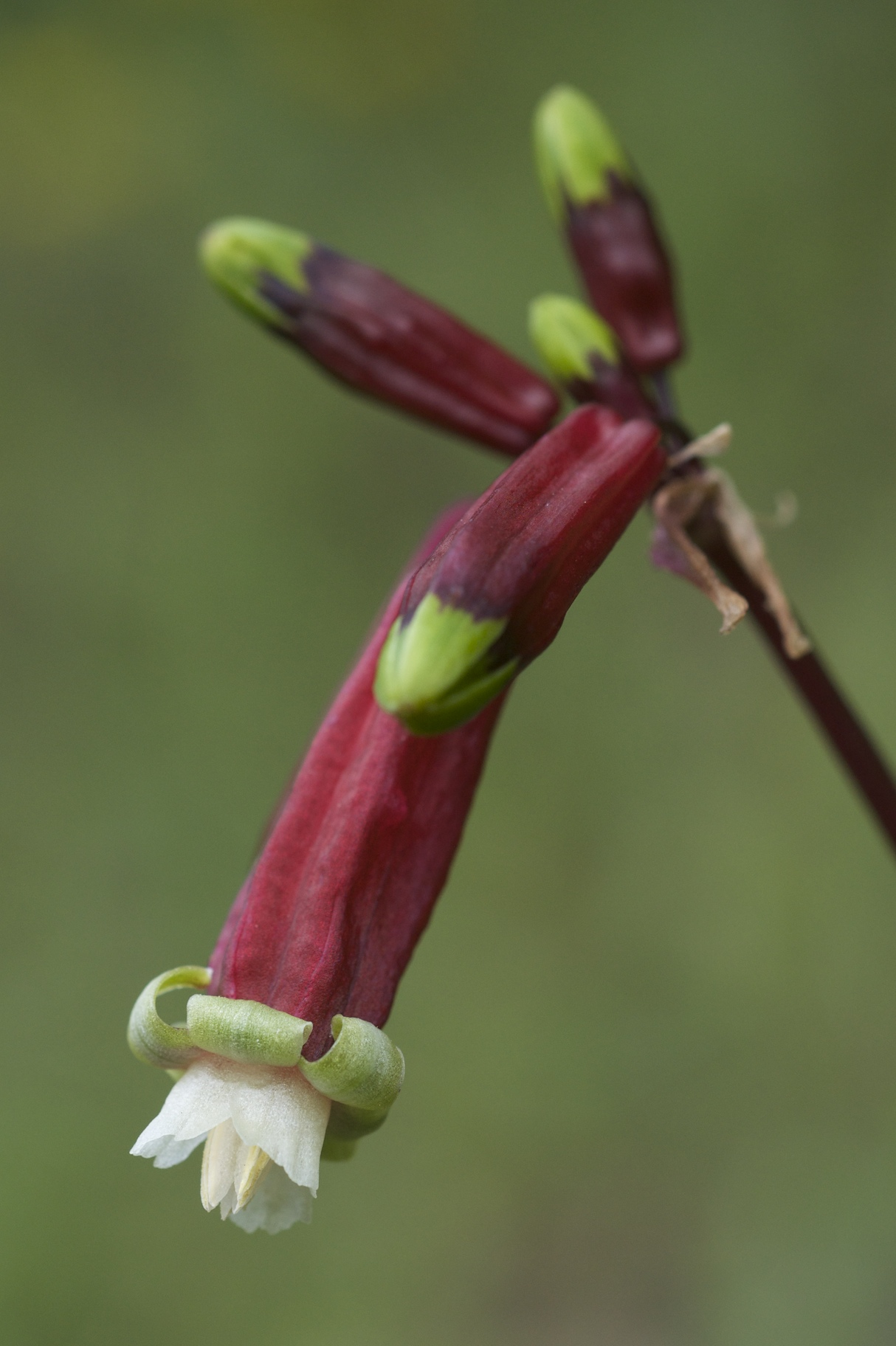

Scientific classification
- Kingdom: Plantae
- Clade: Tracheophytes
- Clade: Angiosperms
- Clade: Monocots
- Order: Asparagales
- Family: Asparagaceae
- Subfamily: Brodiaeoideae
- Genus: Dichelostemma
- Species: D. ida-maia

Binomial name
- Dichelostemma ida-maia (Wood) Greene

Synonyms
- Brevoortia ida-maia; Brodiaea ida-maia

= Dichelostemma ida-maia =

Firecracker flower

Species of flowering plant

Dichelostemma ida-maia is a species of flowering plant known as firecracker flower. It is native to northern California and southern Oregon, where it grows in mountain forests, woodlands, and coastal meadows. It is also widely cultivated as an ornamental plant for its showy crimson and cream flowers.

== Description ==
Dichelostemma ida-maia is a perennial which erects a tall, naked stem topped with an umbel of six to 20 flowers. Each flower is a cylindrical red tube two to three centimeters long. The tip of each flower lobe curls back to reveal a shiny white underside. The curls rim the mouth of the tubular flower in a corona, surrounding the small anthers and a stalked ovary. The flower hangs when it is in anthesis and holds itself erect as the fruit develops. One umbel may have some hanging flowers and some erect fruiting flowers at the same time.
