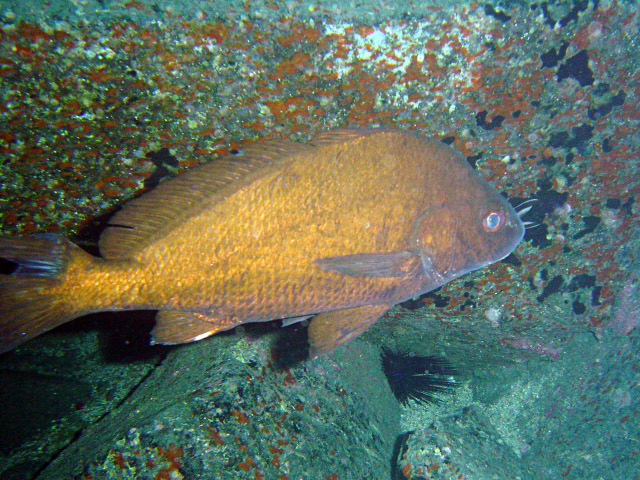

Conservation status
- Least Concern (IUCN 3.1)

Scientific classification
- Kingdom: Animalia
- Phylum: Chordata
- Class: Actinopterygii
- Order: Acanthuriformes
- Family: Sciaenidae
- Genus: Umbrina
- Species: U. canariensis

Binomial name
- Umbrina canariensis Valenciennes, 1843

Synonyms
- Umbrina valida Jordan & Gunn, 1898; Umbrina striata Boulnger, 1888; Sciaena sinuata (Day, 1876); Umbrina sinuata Day 1876; Umbrina lafonti Moreau, 1874

= Umbrina canariensis =

Species of fish

Umbrina canariensis, the Canary drum, is a warm-water marine fish of the family Sciaenidae which is found in the western Mediterranean, eastern Atlantic Ocean and western Indian Ocean. Other English vernacular names are tesselfish, baardman, checker drum, common baardman, tasselfish and bellman.

== Description ==
Umbrina canariensis has a rather short, deeply compressed body with a small downward facing mouth and a short rigid barbell on the chin. The caudal fin is straight edges or sometimes shows a slight s-shape. Most of its scales are ctenoid, except for those on the snout and around the eye, which are cycloid. The colour varies from greyish-silver to darkish with longitudinal dark lines along the back and the higher portion of the sides, these often extend on to the head, becoming obscure as the fish matures. The distal portions of the fins is dark grey to black; while the membranes on rear edge of the gill covers is dark brown. They are normally 40 cm in standard length but can be up to 63 cm. The maximum total length is 80 cm.

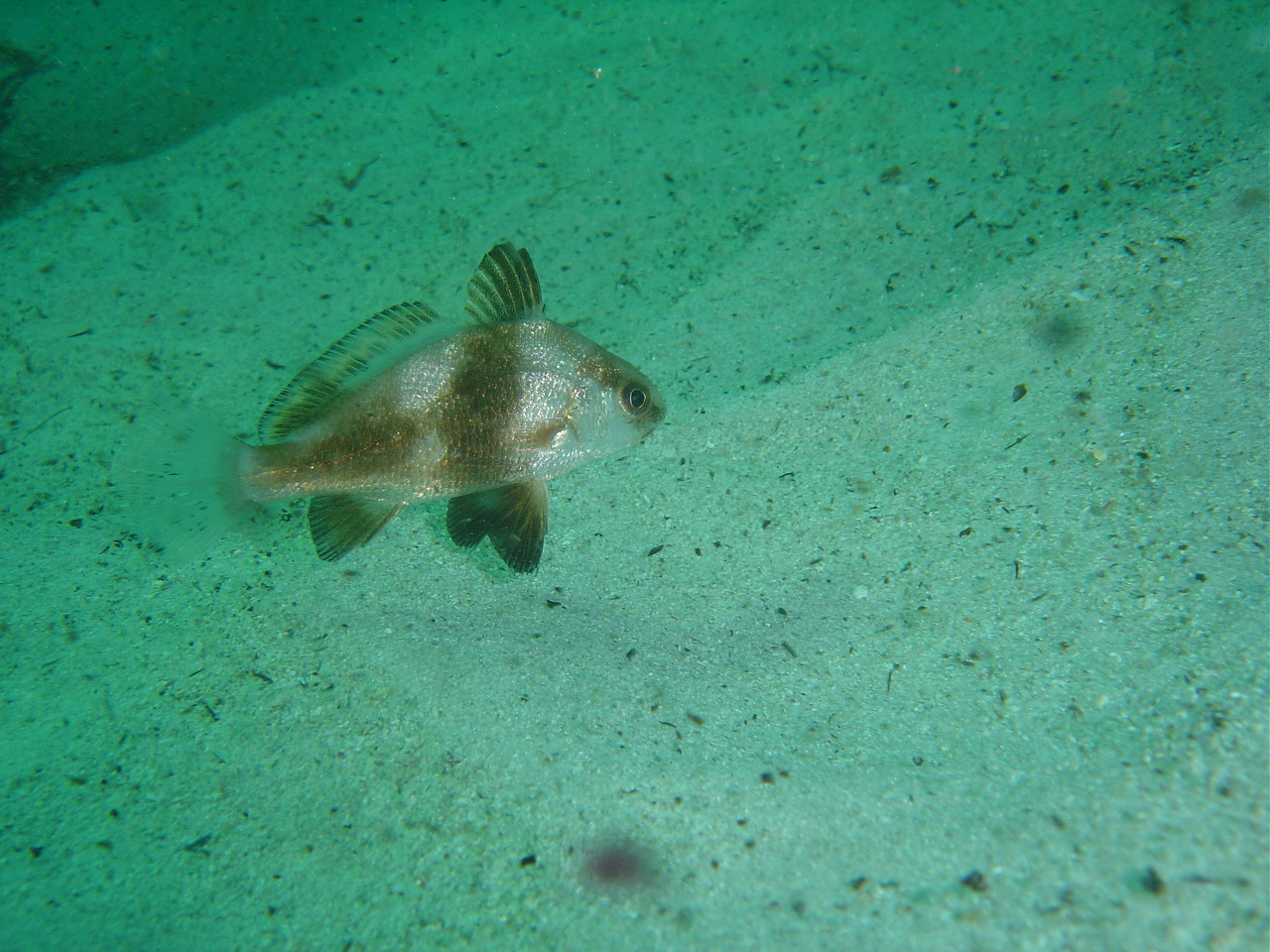
Juvenile at Castle Rocks, Western Cape

== Distribution ==
Umbrina canariensis occurs in the western Mediterranean, as far east as the Sicilian Channel and northeastern Atlantic to the Canary Islands, along most of the western African coastline from Gibraltar to central Namibia. It is uncommon in northern Namibia and absent off southern Namibia and the west coast of South Africa caused by the cold Benguela Upwelling System. In the Western Indian Ocean it occurs from False Bay in Western Cape to Mozambique, it has also been reported from Pakistan.

== Habitat ==
Umbrina canariensis is found in the waters of the continental shelf and upper slope waters, ranging from 50m to 300m in depth, over mud and sand substrates; the juvenile fish are found nearer the shore. It occurs near the shore in the surf zone and also out to more than 400m from the shore, and can also be found over rocky bottoms and in reefs below the low water mark.

== Behaviour ==
Umbrina canariensis feeds on small shrimps, worms and other benthic invertebrates. Spawning is from late spring into the early autumn in Europe. The transparent, buoyant eggs are scattered and left unguarded in open water.

== Fisheries ==
Umbrina canariensis is caught with bottom trawls, fixed bottom nets and line gear. The combined catch of croakers, U. canariensis and Pseudotolithus typus reported from Angola in 2001 was approximately 9000 tons. The fish are sold fresh or dried and salted. In South Africa it is considered to be of low importance and is a bycatch in the trawl fisheries for sole and hake as a result of its low monetary value which means that landings are infrequently reported in catch returns and stock assessment of U. canariensis in the two areas where it is most abundant indicate that the species is not overexploited. In Ghana between 2001 and 2008 the reported catches of Sciaenidae species (including U. canariensis) ranged from 593 to 1,837t.
