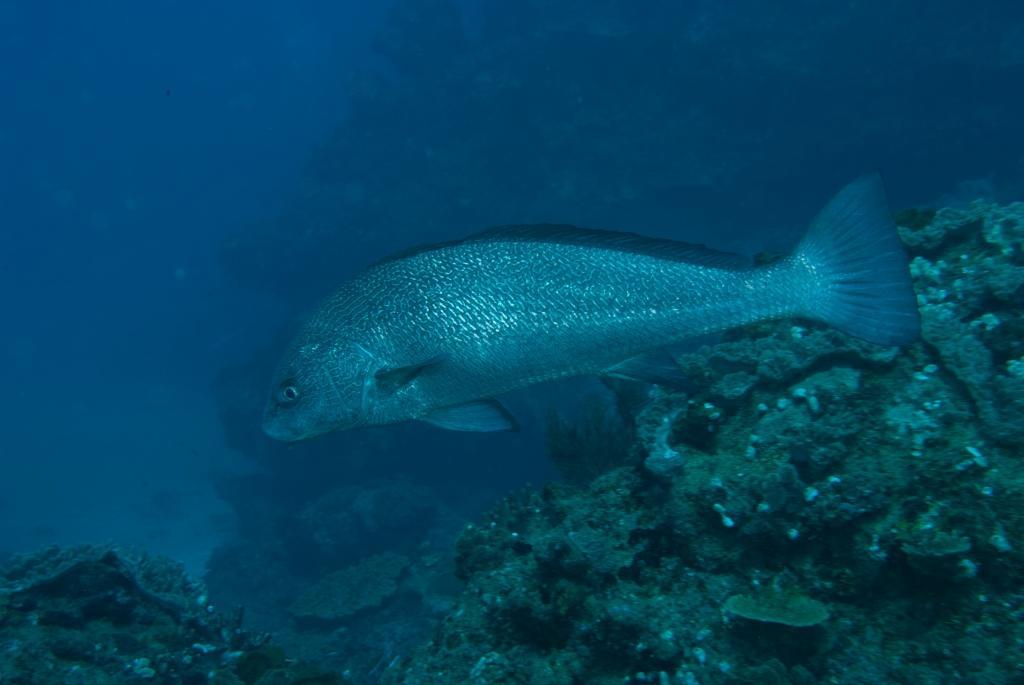

Conservation status
- Data Deficient (IUCN 3.1)

Scientific classification
- Kingdom: Animalia
- Phylum: Chordata
- Class: Actinopterygii
- Order: Acanthuriformes
- Family: Sciaenidae
- Genus: Umbrina
- Species: U. ronchus

Binomial name
- Umbrina ronchus Valenciennes, 1843

Synonyms
- Corvina ronchus (Valenciennes, 1843); Sciaena capensis (Pappe, 1853); Umbrina robinsoni Gilchrist & Thompson, 1908; Sciaena robinsoni (Gilchrist & Thompson, 1908); Umbrina angustilineata Gilchrist & Thompson, 1911; Umbrina fusca Dardignac, 1958

= Umbrina ronchus =

Species of fish from the family Sciaenidae

Umbrina ronchus, the fusca drum, slender baardman, roncador, fusca croaker or slender tasselfish, is a species of croaker or drum from the family Sciaenidae which is found in the western Atlantic Ocean and the Mediterranean Sea.

== Description ==
Umbrina ronchus has a rather elongate and moderately deep body. The small mouth is positioned inferiorly and contains the villiform teeth which are typical of the genus Umbrina and it has a short stiff barbell on its chin which has a pore on its tip. The tail is usually truncate but may be slightly emarginate. Its scales are mainly ctenoid. They are dark brown in colour with faint diagonal linear markings along the scale rows in larger individuals these markings are faded. The fins are dusky coloured except for the pelvic fins and the distal part of anal fin which are black. They grow to 77 cm standard length, most are around 40 cm.

== Distribution ==
Umbrina ronchus occurs in the eastern Atlantic Ocean from the western Mediterranean Sea and the Straits of Gibraltar south to the Western Cape and into the western Indian Ocean to the Persian Gulf. There are no current records from Namibia.

== Habitat and behaviour ==
Umbrina ronchus is found in inshore waters off sandy beaches and sheltering among rocks, from 20 to 200 m depth. The juveniles are mainly found in close to the shore, but unlike other sciaenids they are not normally found in estuaries. Its prey is small decapods, molluscs, worms and other benthic invertebrates.

== Fisheries ==
Umbrina ronchus is of minor commercial importance and is normally sold fresh.

== Taxonomy ==
The habitat location for Umbrina ronchus is the Canary Islands and in one study, specimens from the Canary Islands and South Africa were compared against one another. The researchers concluded that the South African specimens represented a different taxon, and they suggested resurrecting Umbrina robinsoni as the name for this taxon as the form occurring off South Africa and in the western Indian Ocean. In addition, there is some doubt about the occurrence of this species in tropical West African waters as specimens identified as this species are considered more likely to be Steindachner's drum Umbrina steindachneri.
