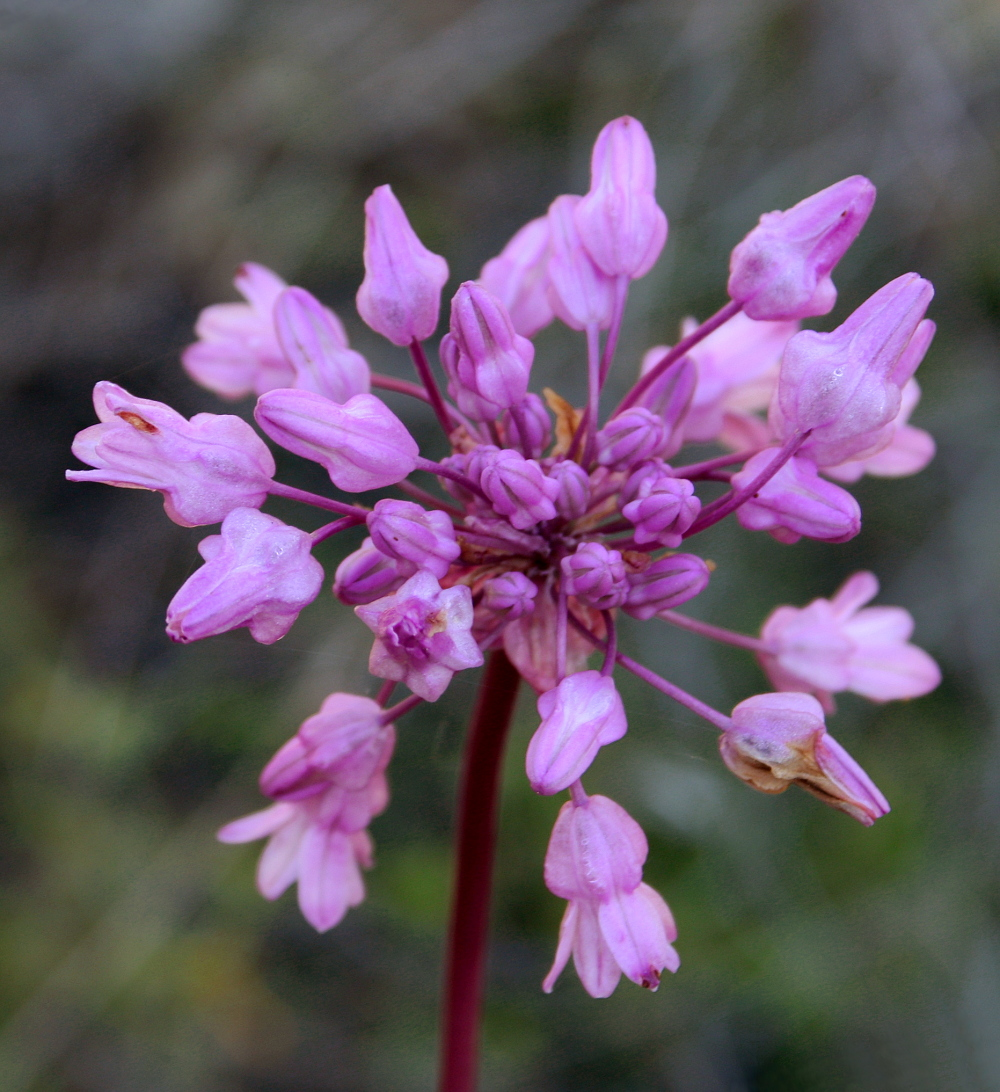

Scientific classification
- Kingdom: Plantae
- Clade: Tracheophytes
- Clade: Angiosperms
- Clade: Monocots
- Order: Asparagales
- Family: Asparagaceae
- Subfamily: Brodiaeoideae
- Genus: Dichelostemma
- Species: D. volubile

Binomial name
- Dichelostemma volubile (Kellogg) A. Heller

= Dichelostemma volubile =

Species of flowering plant

Dichelostemma volubile is a species of flowering plant known by the common names twining snakelily and twining brodiaea. This wildflower is endemic to the mountain foothills of California, where it grows in scrub and woodland.

Dichelostemma volubile grows tall, erect, naked stems topped with spherical inflorescences of up to 30 densely packed pink flowers. Each flower is a tube up to a centimeter long with a spreading corolla of six petal-like lobes. The purplish or reddish stems may twine tightly around each other and occasionally other plants.
