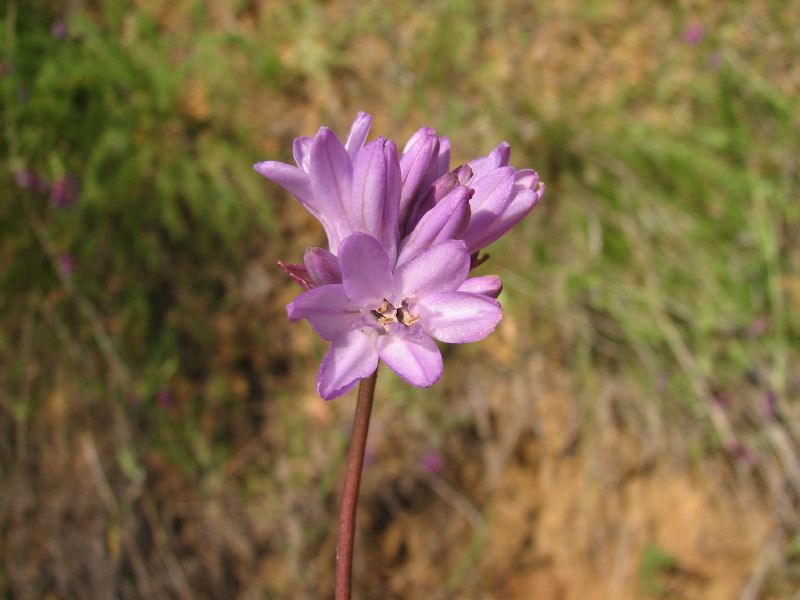

Scientific classification
- Kingdom: Plantae
- Clade: Embryophytes
- Clade: Tracheophytes
- Clade: Angiosperms
- Clade: Monocots
- Order: Asparagales
- Family: Asparagaceae
- Subfamily: Brodiaeoideae
- Genus: Dichelostemma
- Species: D. congestum

Binomial name
- Dichelostemma congestum (Sm.) Kunth

Synonyms
- Brodiaea congesta

= Dichelostemma congestum =

Species of flowering plant

Dichelostemma congestum is a species of flowering plant known by the common name ookow or fork-toothed ookow. It is native to California, Oregon and Washington.

Its tall, thin, naked stem is topped with an inflorescence packed densely with six to 15 flowers, each about a centimeter wide and long, with usually six petal-like lobes in shades of bright purple.

It was first published in 1811 as Brodiaea congesta.

== Uses ==
The bulbs of D. congestum can be consumed and their use is part of the ethnobotany of multiple indigenous people of California. The bulbs were eaten raw by the Maidu and Nisenan who, along with the Hupa, also further prepared the bulbs for consumption by roasting them in ashes or boiling them in baskets.
