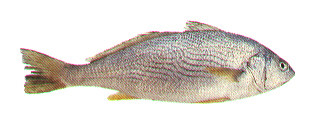

Conservation status
- Least Concern (IUCN 3.1)

Scientific classification
- Kingdom: Animalia
- Phylum: Chordata
- Class: Actinopterygii
- Order: Acanthuriformes
- Family: Sciaenidae
- Genus: Umbrina
- Species: U. roncador

Binomial name
- Umbrina roncador Jordan & Gilbert, 1882

= Yellowfin croaker =

Species of ray-finned fish

The yellowfin croaker (Umbrina roncador) is a species of croaker occurring from the Gulf of California, Mexico, to Point Conception, California. They frequent bays, channels, harbors and other nearshore waters over sandy bottoms. These croakers are more abundant along beaches during the summer months and may move to deeper water in winter. There is no set size limit for the yellowfin croaker.

Other common names include yellowfin drum, Catalina croaker, yellowtailed croaker, and golden croaker.

== Description ==
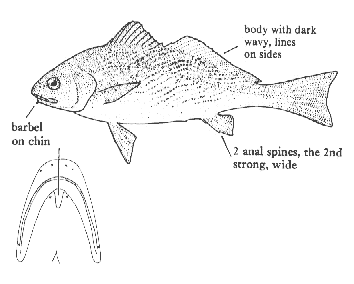

The body of the yellowfin croaker is elliptical-elongate with the back somewhat arched. The head is conical and blunt. The color is iridescent blue to gray with brassy reflections on the back diffusing to silvery white below. The sides and back have many diagonal dark wavy lines. The fins are yellowish except for the dark dorsal fins. The yellowfin croaker differs from other California croakers in having a single fleshy projection, a barbel, on the lower jaw and two heavy spines at the front of the anal fin.

The diet of the yellowfin croaker consists mainly of small fishes and fish fry; however, invertebrates such as small crustaceans, worms and mollusks are also eaten in large numbers. Spawning takes place during the summer months when this species is most common along the sandy beaches. Maturity is apparently not reached until the fish are slightly over 9 inches long. The largest recorded specimen was 20.13 inches; no weight reported. However, an 18-inch yellowfin croaker weighed 4.5 pounds.

== Fishing information ==
Yellowfin croaker are most often taken by surf anglers using softshelled sand crabs, worms, mussels, clams, Gulp! soft baits, or cut fish as bait. They are most commonly caught between Ventura County and central Baja California.

== See also ==
- Umbrina cirrosa, European species
