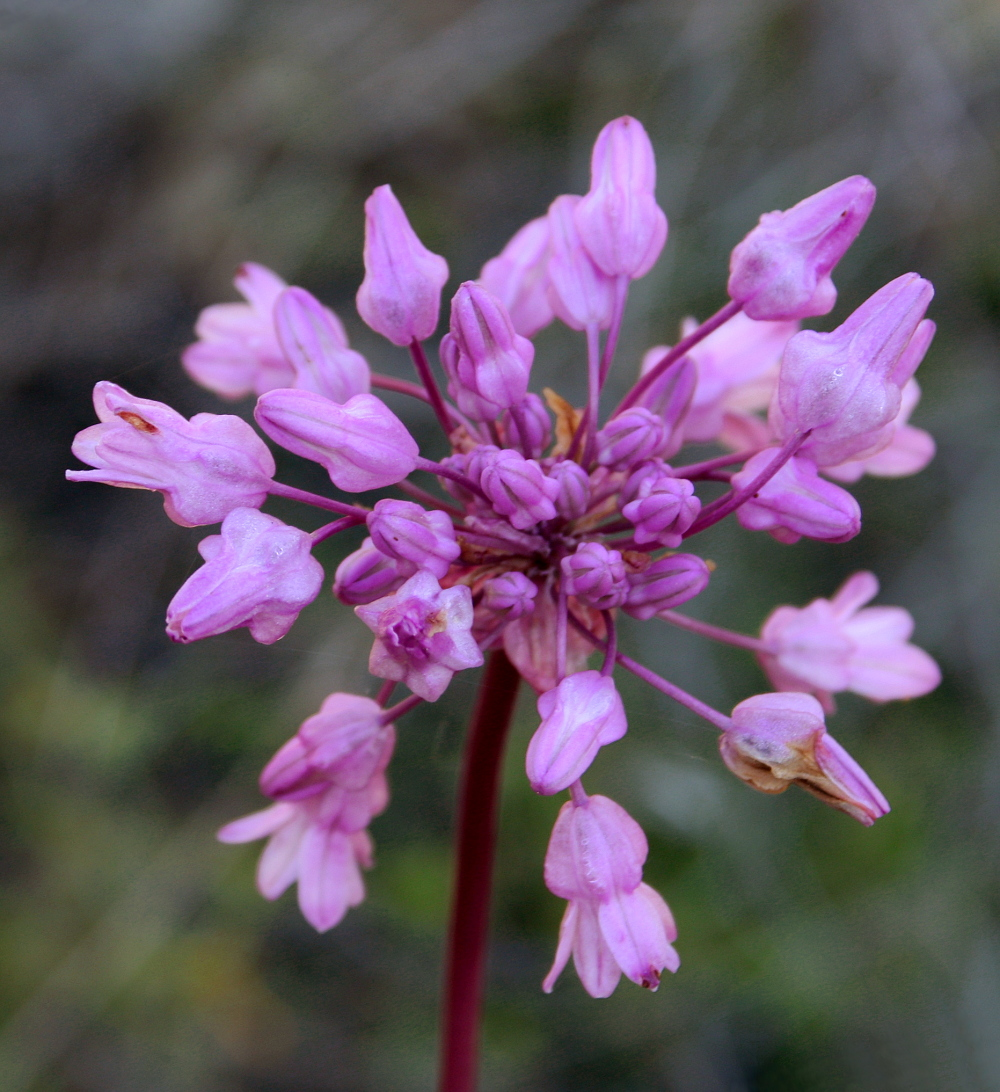
- Dichelostemma volubile

Scientific classification
- Kingdom: Plantae
- Clade: Tracheophytes
- Clade: Angiosperms
- Clade: Monocots
- Order: Asparagales
- Family: Asparagaceae
- Subfamily: Brodiaeoideae
- Genus: Dichelostemma; Kunth

Type species
- Dichelostemma congestum (Sm.) Kunth

Synonyms
- Brodiaea subg. Dichelostemma (Kunth) Eastw.; Stropholirion Torr.; Rupalleya Morière; Brevoortia Alph.Wood; Macroscapa Kellogg ex Curran; Dipterostemon Rydb.

= Dichelostemma =

Genus of flowering plants

Dichelostemma is a genus of North American plants closely related to the genus Brodiaea and sometimes regarded as part of that group.

Dichelostemma is classified in the cluster-lily subfamily within the asparagus family. in the latest Angiosperm Phylogeny Group classification (2009). Older sources often placed it in the lily family; earlier versions of the APG classifications used the family Themidaceae.

The genus is native to the North America, especially in northern California, but also east to New Mexico and north to British Columbia and south into northwestern Mexico.

These plants grow from perennial corms that produce a raceme or umbel-like inflorescence. The flowers are bell- or tube-shaped and produce capsules with black seeds. The name, from the Greek for "toothed crown", refers to the stamen appendages.

== Diversity ==
Species

Image	Scientific name	Common name	Distribution
	Dichelostemma congestum (Sm.) Kunth	ookow or fork-toothed ookow.	Canada (BC), United States (WA OR CA)
	Dichelostemma ida-maia (Alph.Wood) Greene	firecracker flower	United States (CA OR)
	Dichelostemma multiflorum (Benth.) A.Heller	round-tooth snake-lily, many-flower brodiaea and wild hyacinth	United States (CA OR)
	Dichelostemma volubile (Kellogg) A.Heller	twining snakelily and twining brodiaea.	United States (CA OR)

Dichelostemma capitatum (Benth.) Alph.Wood – blue dicks – has been moved to Dipterostemon capitatus.

Cultivars

- Dichelostemma 'Pink Diamond' - probably D. ida-maia × D. congestum (sometimes called Dichelostemma congestum).
