= Umbrina reedi =

Conservation status
- Least Concern (IUCN 3.1)

Scientific classification
- Kingdom: Animalia
- Phylum: Chordata
- Class: Actinopterygii
- Division: Teleostei
- Order: Acanthuriformes
- Family: Sciaenidae
- Genus: Umbrina
- Species: U. reedi

Binomial name
- Umbrina reedi Günther, 1880

Synonyms
- Sciaena reedi (Günther, 1880)

Species of ray-finned fish

Umbrina reedi is a species of ray-finned fish within the family Sciaenidae. It is endemic to the southeastern Pacific Ocean, where it is found off the Juan Fernandez Archipelago and Isla San Felix in the Desventuradas Islands, inhabiting rocky shores at depths up to 30 metres (100 ft). The maximum length of the species has been recorded at 77 centimetres (30 in).

== Conservation ==
Umbrina reedi has been classified as a 'Least concern' species by the IUCN Red List. Despite its restricted distribution, the species has no known major threats that can severely impact it. Local fisherman are known to catch the species using gill nets, but there is no data that suggest this reduces the current population of the fish.
