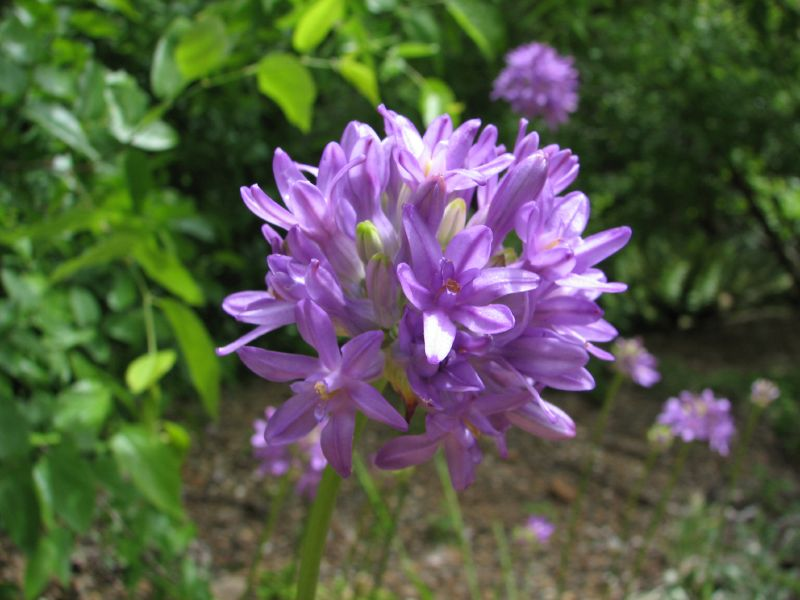

Scientific classification
- Kingdom: Plantae
- Clade: Tracheophytes
- Clade: Angiosperms
- Clade: Monocots
- Order: Asparagales
- Family: Asparagaceae
- Subfamily: Brodiaeoideae
- Genus: Dichelostemma
- Species: D. multiflorum

Binomial name
- Dichelostemma multiflorum A. Heller

Synonyms
- Brodiaea multiflora

= Dichelostemma multiflorum =

Species of flowering plant

Dichelostemma multiflorum is a species of flowering plant known by the common names round-tooth snake-lily, many-flower brodiaea and wild hyacinth (although the latter name is shared with a number of other taxa). It is native to California and Oregon, where it grows in hills, mountains, and inland grasslands. It is a perennial wildflower erecting a tall, naked stem topped with a spherical inflorescence of up to 35 densely packed purple or pink-purple flowers. Each flower is a tube about a centimeter long with six petal-like lobes arranged in a starlike corolla. The lobes may curl back slightly.
