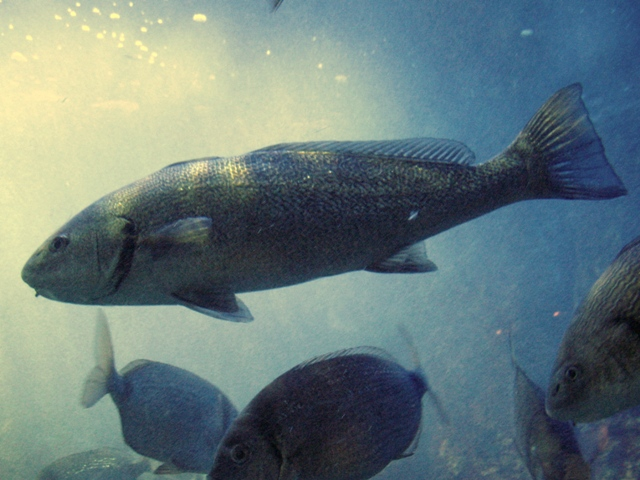
- Umbrina cirrosa Acquario di Genova

Conservation status
- Vulnerable (IUCN 3.1)

Scientific classification
- Kingdom: Animalia
- Phylum: Chordata
- Class: Actinopterygii
- Order: Acanthuriformes
- Family: Sciaenidae
- Genus: Umbrina
- Species: U. cirrosa

Binomial name
- Umbrina cirrosa (Linnaeus, 1758)

Synonyms
- Sciaena cirrosa Linnaeus, 1758; Sparus coracinus Asso, 1801; Cheilodipterus cyanopterus Lacepède, 1801; Perca umbra Lacepède, 1802; Coracinus boops Pallas, 1814; Umbrina vulgaris Cuvier, 1830; Sciaena cestreus Gronow, 1854; Asperina improvisa Ostroumoff, 1896

= Umbrina cirrosa =

Species of fish

Umbrina cirrosa, the shi drum, is a species of marine fish from the warmer waters of the eastern Atlantic Ocean, Mediterranean Sea and the Black Sea. It is a commercially important species which is trawled for and farmed in aquaculture, as well as being a species pursued by anglers and spear fishermen for sport. The alternative vernacular names are gurbell, sea crow, bearded umbrine and corb.

== Description ==
Umbrina cirrosa has a moderately elongated body which is deep and laterally compressed. Its small mouth has an inferior setting and contains villiform teeth while on its chin there is a short and rigid barbel which is perforated by a pore at its tip. Its scales are mainly ctenoid in form except for those on the breast, snout and sub-orbital region, where they are predominantly cycloid. It is greyish-silver to brownish in colour, with a metallic sheen and is marked with longitudinal dark lines on the dorsal regions; the membranes on hind margin of gill cover are jet black in colour while the fins are dusky. The maximum length recorded is 73 cm total length, although the average is 40 cm.

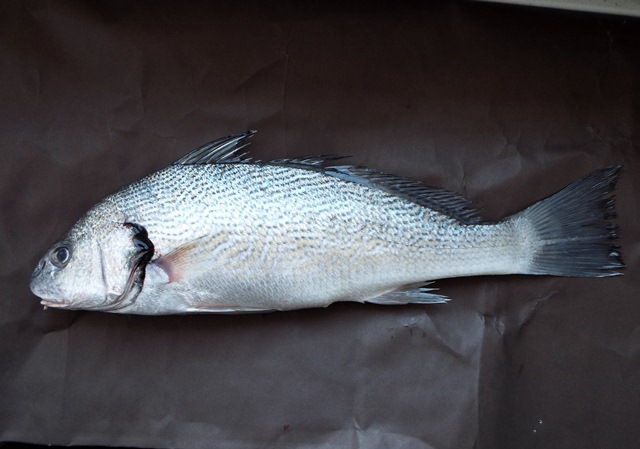
The shi drum from Italy.

== Distribution ==
Umbrina cirrosa is found in the eastern Atlantic Ocean from the Bay of Biscay to southern Morocco and in the Mediterranean, although it is not found around the larger islands, and Black Sea and Sea of Azov. It has also spread into the Gulf of Suez through the Suez Canal, one of the few Lessepsian migrants to go from the Mediterranean to the Red Sea, known as anti-Lessepsian migrants.

== Habitat and behaviour ==
Umbrina cirrosa is a demersal species which is found in inshore waters, over both rock and sandy sea beds. The juveniles occur in estuaries. The males produce pulses of sound to attract the females and spawning begins in May and peaks in June, the eggs being scattered over the substrate, each female lays more than one batch of spawn. The prey taken by this species includes sardines, anchovies, mackerels, cuttlefish, molluscs and worms, but the main prey are benthic invertebrates.

== Fisheries ==
Umbrina cirrosa has been recorded as being landed by fishermen in seven Mediterranean countries, the largest catches have been in Turkey and Italy. There has been a steep decline in landings in these two countries over the last ten years. The average landing figures for the years 1986 to 1990 were 1,393t and this has declined by 80% compared with the average figures for the years 2001 to 2005 being 278t. In the European Union over 1,000t was landed in 1995 but this had fallen to less than 100t by 2008. The species is now being farmed in aquaculture in countries such a Cyprus. The European record for a fish caught by an angler is 11.2 kg, this fish was caught in 1992 off Corsica. This species is also pursued by spear fishers.
