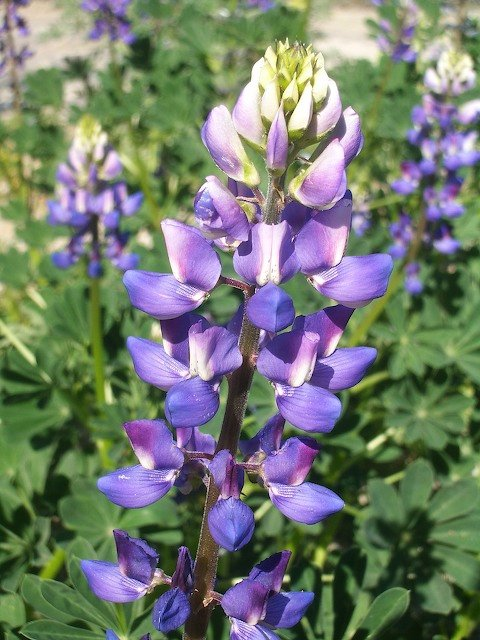

Scientific classification
- Kingdom: Plantae
- Clade: Tracheophytes
- Clade: Angiosperms
- Clade: Eudicots
- Clade: Rosids
- Order: Fabales
- Family: Fabaceae
- Subfamily: Faboideae
- Genus: Lupinus
- Species: L. succulentus

Binomial name
- Lupinus succulentus Douglas ex K.Koch

Synonyms
- Lupinus succulentus var. brandegeei C.P.Sm.; Lupinus succulentus var. layneae C.P.Sm.

= Lupinus succulentus =

Species of legume

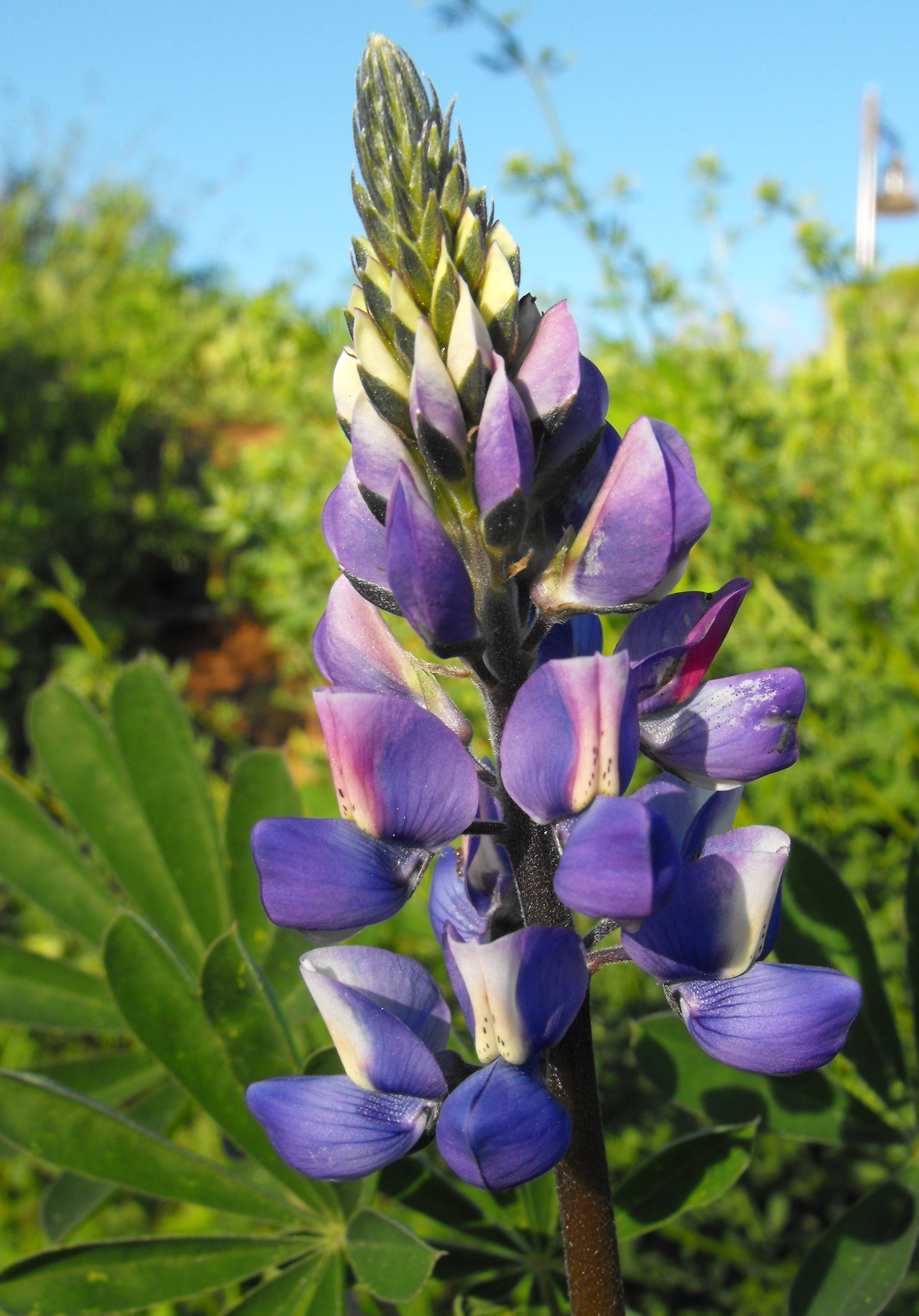
L. succulentus, Poway, San Diego County

Lupinus succulentus is a species of lupine in the family Fabaceae. It is known by the common names hollowleaf annual lupine, arroyo lupine, and succulent lupine.

It is native to California, where it is common throughout much of the state, and adjacent sections of Arizona and Baja California. L. succulentus is known from many types of habitat and it can colonize disturbed areas.

== Description ==
L. succulentus is a fleshy annual herb that grows up to 1 meter (3.3 ft) in height. The amount of fertility and moisture generally dictates the height of the plant. Prefers moist clay or heavy soils in full sun. Each palmate leaf is made up of 7 to 9 leaflets up to 6 centimeters long.

The inflorescence is a series of whorls of flowers each between 1 and 2 centimeters long. The flower is generally purple-blue with a white or pink patch on its banner, and there are sometimes flowers in shades of light purple, pink, and white.

The fruit is a roughly hairy legume pod up to 5 centimeters long and about 1 centimeter wide.

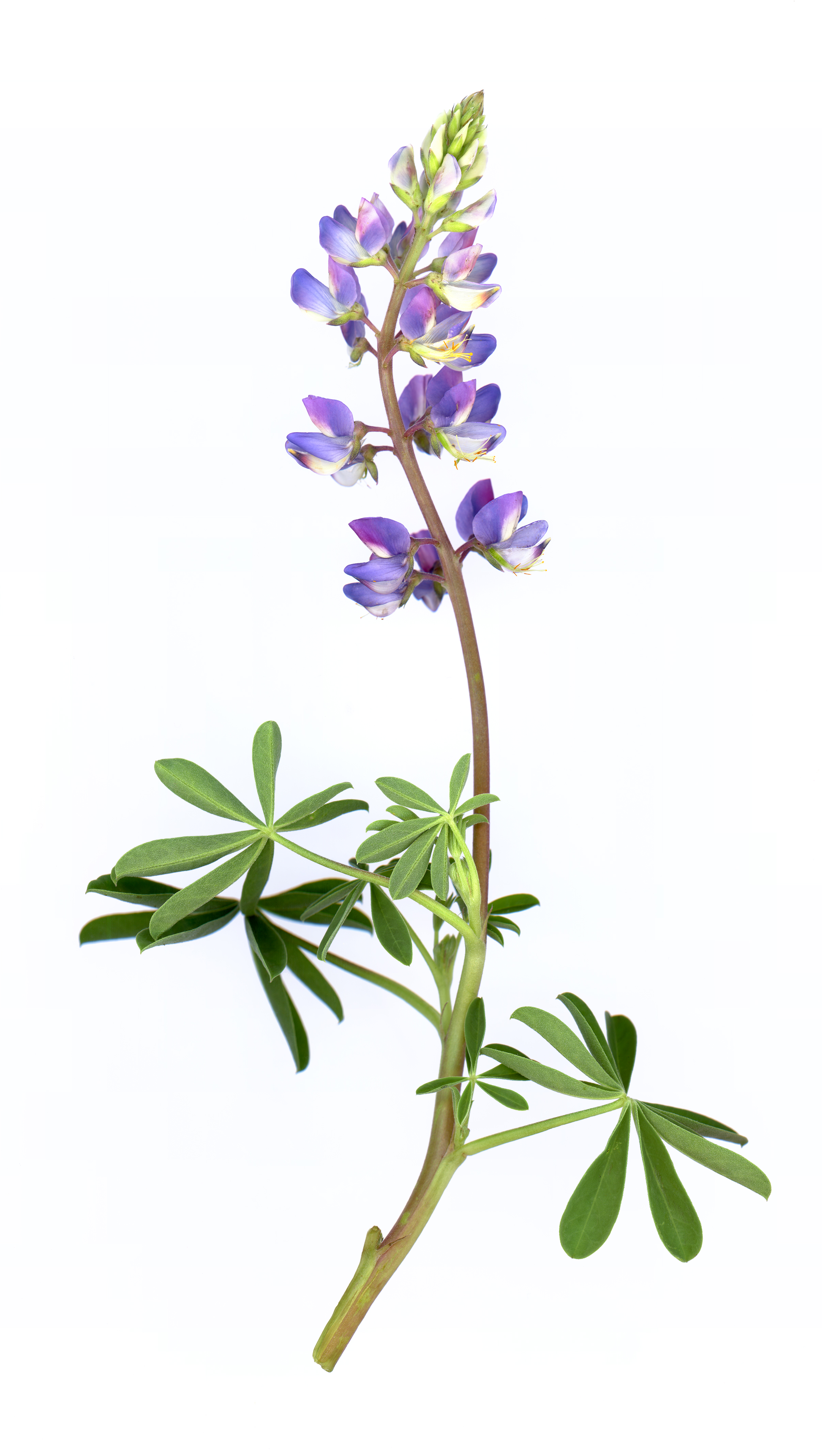
A scan of Lupinus Succulentus

== Cultivation ==
Being the most water tolerant of all lupines, L. succulentus is used cultivated as an ornamental plant, for flower borders, native plant and wildlife gardens, and in natural landscaping projects.

Horticultural specifications

- Height: 1–4 feet
- Optimum soil temperature for germination: 55 °F–70 °F
- Blooming Period: April–May
- Germination: 15–75 days
- Sowing depth: 1/8"

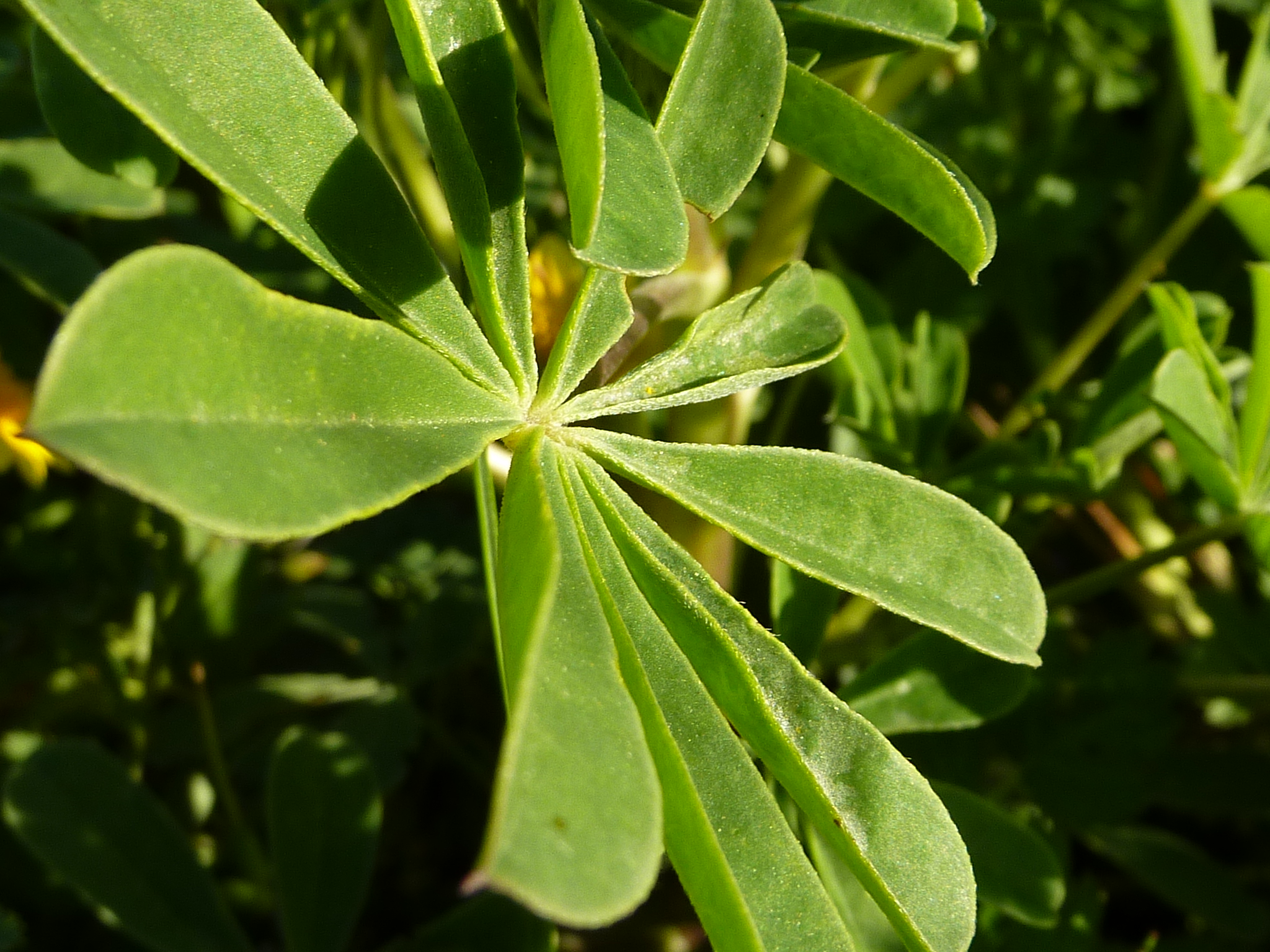
Lupinus succulentus leaf.

== Fire ecology ==
Lupinus succulentus is a fire-following annual and its seeds are classed as refractory. In laboratory experiments, heating seeds for five minutes at 90-105 °C increased germination compared with unheated seeds, while heating at 120 °C sharply reduced it. Seedlings from heat-treated seeds showed no difference in growth or survival.

In the field, this pattern appears as a short-lived post-fire flush. After the 1978 Agoura-Kanan fire in the Santa Monica Mountains, the species dominated the herbaceous cover on some coastal sage scrub slopes in the first growing season, then was rare or absent the following year. On one north-facing slope in Encinal Canyon, it made up about 90% of herb cover in the first post-fire season but less than 0.01% in the second.
