= Long Beach Public Library =

Public library system in California, United States

Coordinates: 33.767808°N 118.194609°W

The Long Beach Public Library (LBPL) is an American public library system located in Long Beach, California.

== Main Library ==
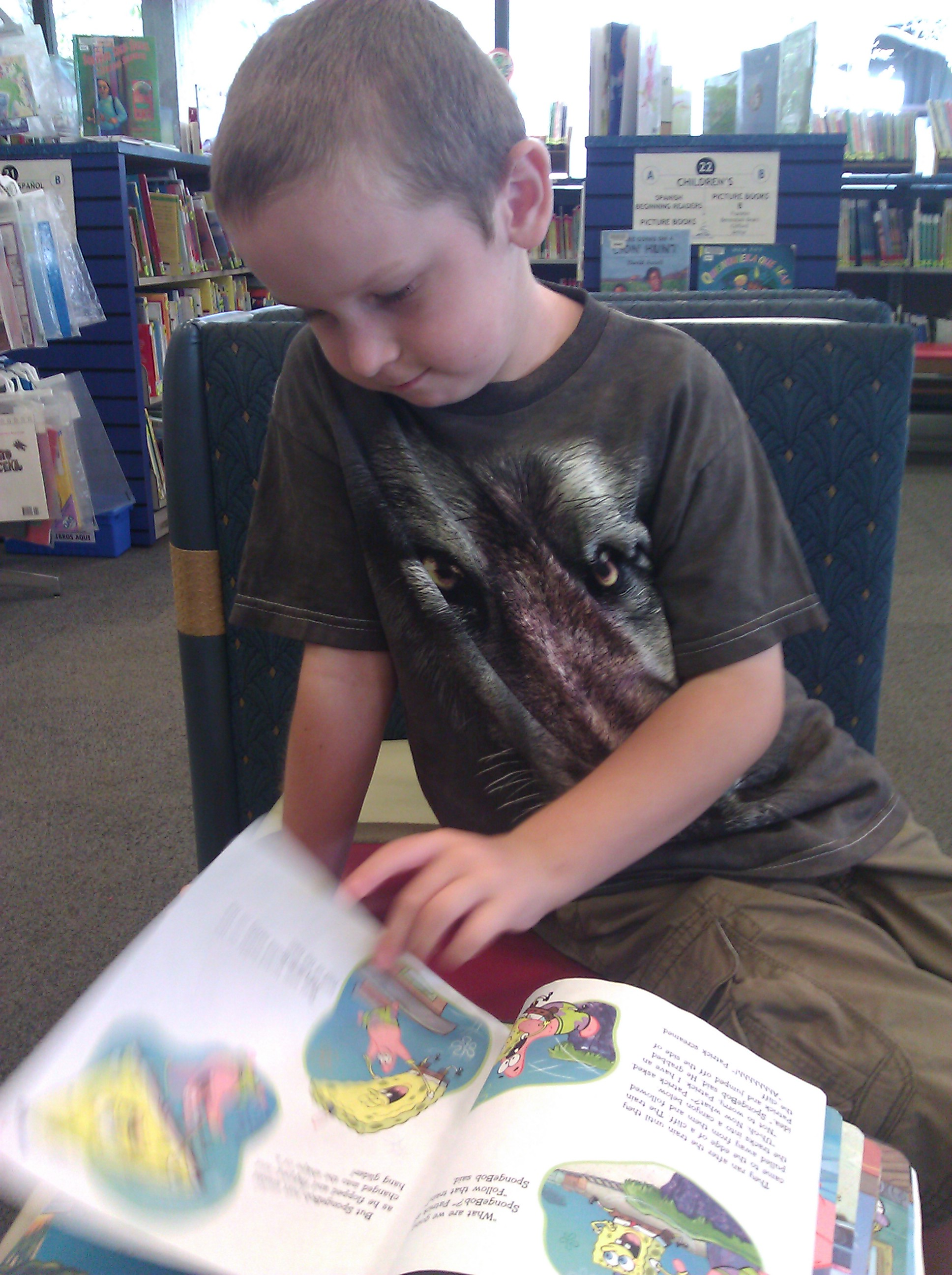
A child reading a book inside the Main library.

The Main Library's first building was funded by a $30,000 donation from Andrew Carnegie and $4,000 of city funds. The Library opened in 1909 within Pacific Park, now known as Lincoln Park, downtown on Pacific Avenue at Broadway. When the building site was condemned for construction of a New Main Library and City Hall building in the late 1970s, the library was moved to a building located on Ximeno Avenue, for a period of about 18 months.

In 2015, the Long Beach Public Library became the first library in California to begin circulating zines publicly in its collection. Now the main branch houses a few hundred zines to take home.

In January 2019, the Main Library was permanently closed in lieu of the new location, which reopened on September 21, 2019, as the Billie Jean King Main Library, with King attending the ribbon-cutting ceremony herself. The building occupies a first floor and lower level at 101 Pacific Avenue, at the intersection of Ocean Boulevard and Pacific Avenue, across the park from its former location.

The library displays nine murals titled "9 Children's Stories" by artist Suzanne Miller, created with the support of the Federal Art Project and Works Progress Administration.

== Branches ==
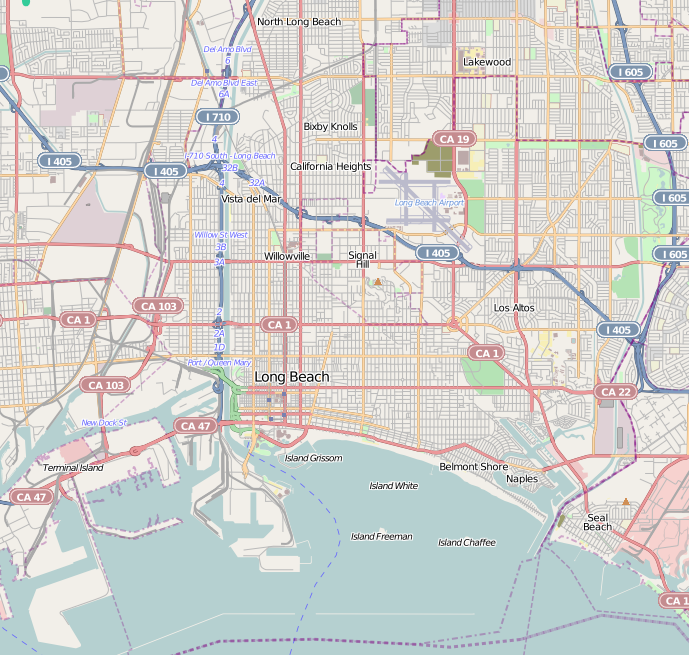
A map of each library location under the Long Beach Public Library system.

In addition to the main library, there are eleven branches:

- Alamitos Branch, Bluff Heights/Franklin/Carroll Park
- Ruth Bach Branch, Lakewood Village
- Bay Shore Branch, Belmont Shore/Naples
- Brewitt Branch, Recreation Park/Bryant
- Burnett Branch, Sunrise/Wrigley
- Dana Branch, California Heights
- El Dorado Branch, El Dorado Park
- Bret Harte Branch, West Long Beach
- Los Altos Branch, Los Altos
- Michelle Obama Branch, North Long Beach
- Mark Twain Branch Hellman

The Alamitos branch was constructed by the Works Progress Administration in 1938.
