= Alamitos Beach, Long Beach, California =

Neighborhood in Long Beach, California, US

Alamitos Beach, California
- Neighborhood of Long Beach
- Alamitos Beach
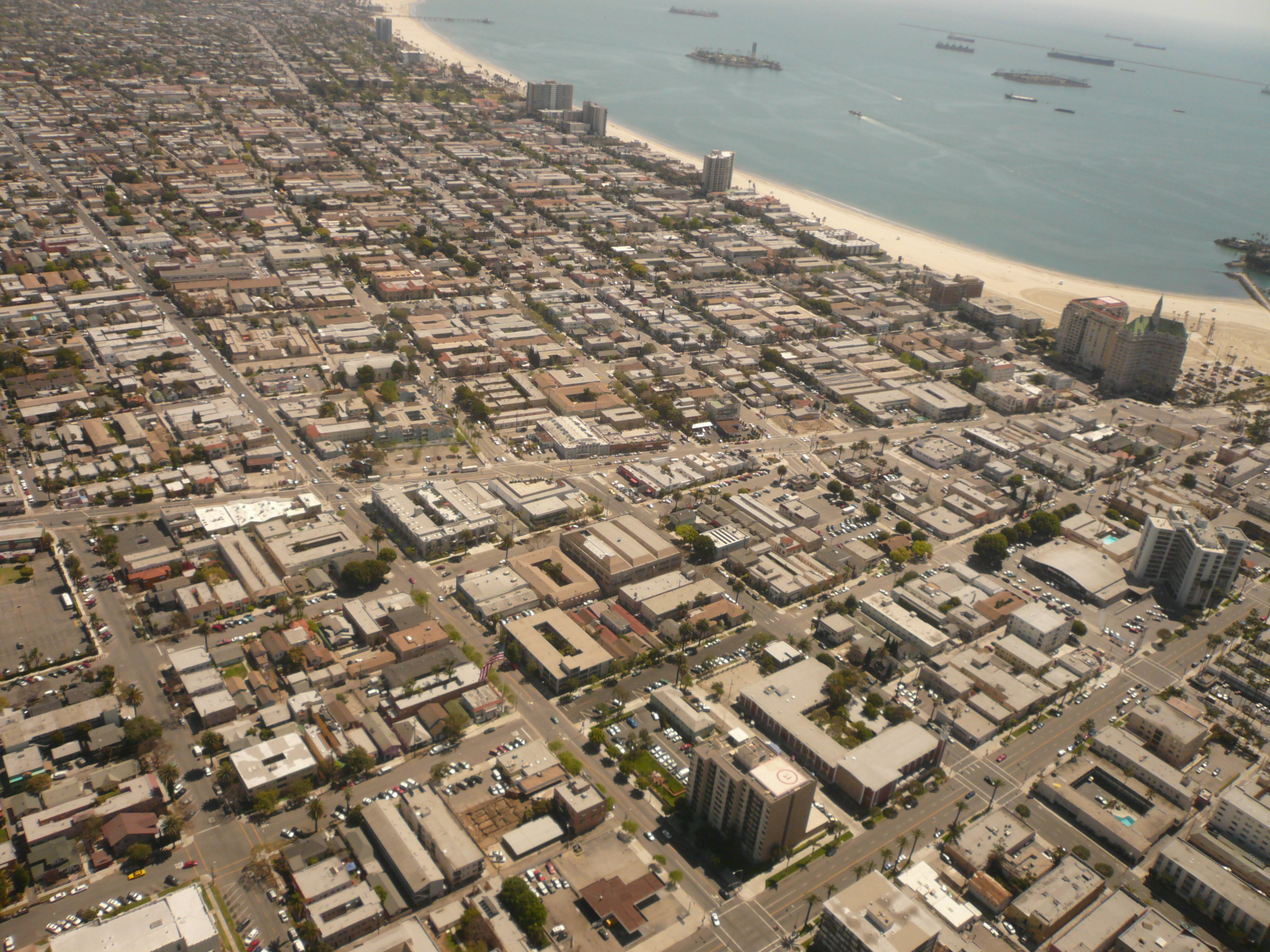
- The Alamitos Beach neighborhood of Long Beach, California, looking southeast. Alamitos Avenue runs left to right across the center of the photo; Alamitos Beach is located above it, with the East Village below. 4th Street cuts from the top left corner to the bottom center; Alamitos Beach is to the right of it.

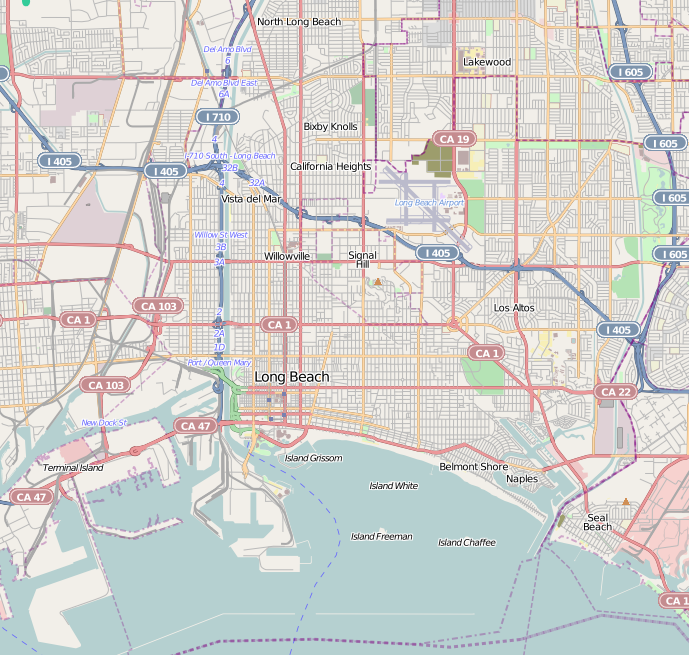
- Location within Long Beach Alamitos Beach (the Los Angeles metropolitan area)
- Coordinates: 33.7680875°N 118.1751669°W
- Country: United States
- State: California
- County: Los Angeles
- City: Long Beach

Alamitos Beach is a coastal neighborhood in the southern portion of the city of Long Beach, California. Although it was in unincorporated Los Angeles County when annexed by the City of Long Beach, it had been planned as its own community with a townsite. Alamitos Beach is scheduled to host the beach volleyball competitions during the 2028 Summer Olympics in Los Angeles.

== Location ==
Alamitos Beach is bounded by Junipero Avenue on the east, Shoreline Drive and Alamitos Boulevard on the west, 4th Street on the north, and Ocean Boulevard on the south. Surrounding neighborhoods include the East Village Arts District to the west, North Alamitos Beach (NABA) and Hellman to the north and Bluff Park to the east, with a wide sandy beach along the Pacific Ocean to the south.

== Climate ==
Due to its coastal location next to the Pacific Ocean, temperatures in Alamitos Beach are moderate throughout the year. Heat and humidity rarely coincide, making heat waves more tolerable than they would be otherwise. Temperature highs typically range from the low 80 °F (27 °C)s in the summertime, 70 °F (21 °C)s during the spring and fall, and 60 °F (16 °C)s in the winter.

As in most locations in Southern California, rainfall occurs largely during the winter months. Storms can bring heavy rainfall, but Alamitos Beach receives less precipitation than locations adjacent to the San Gabriel or San Bernardino mountains further inland, whose rainfall is enhanced by orographic lift.

== Characteristics ==
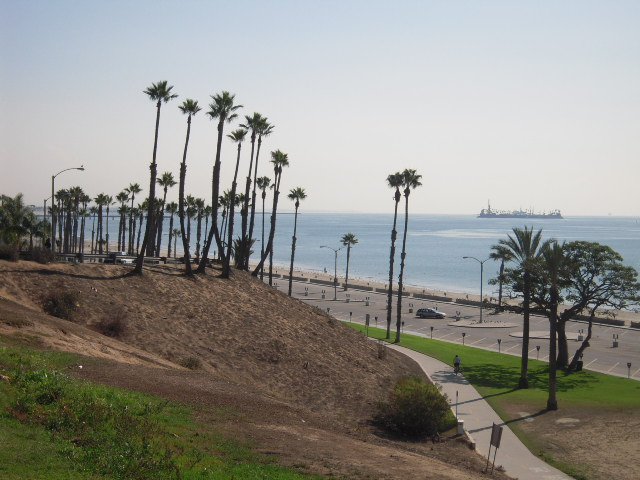
Bixby Park and the beach, at Alamitos Beach.

The coastal neighborhood is mainly dense residential, with large condominium buildings along the beach and smaller condominiums, apartment buildings, and single family residences as one moves inland. A public beach is within short walking distance of all residences with some buildings having direct access. The beach includes the Long Beach bicycle path that starts at Shoreline Village and ends in the Belmont Shore neighborhood of Long Beach. Beginning in 2009 bike lanes were added to 1st, 2nd, and 3rd St. as part of the Long Beach's citywide effort to become more bicycle friendly. Perhaps not so coincidentally more bicycle shops have since opened around the area.

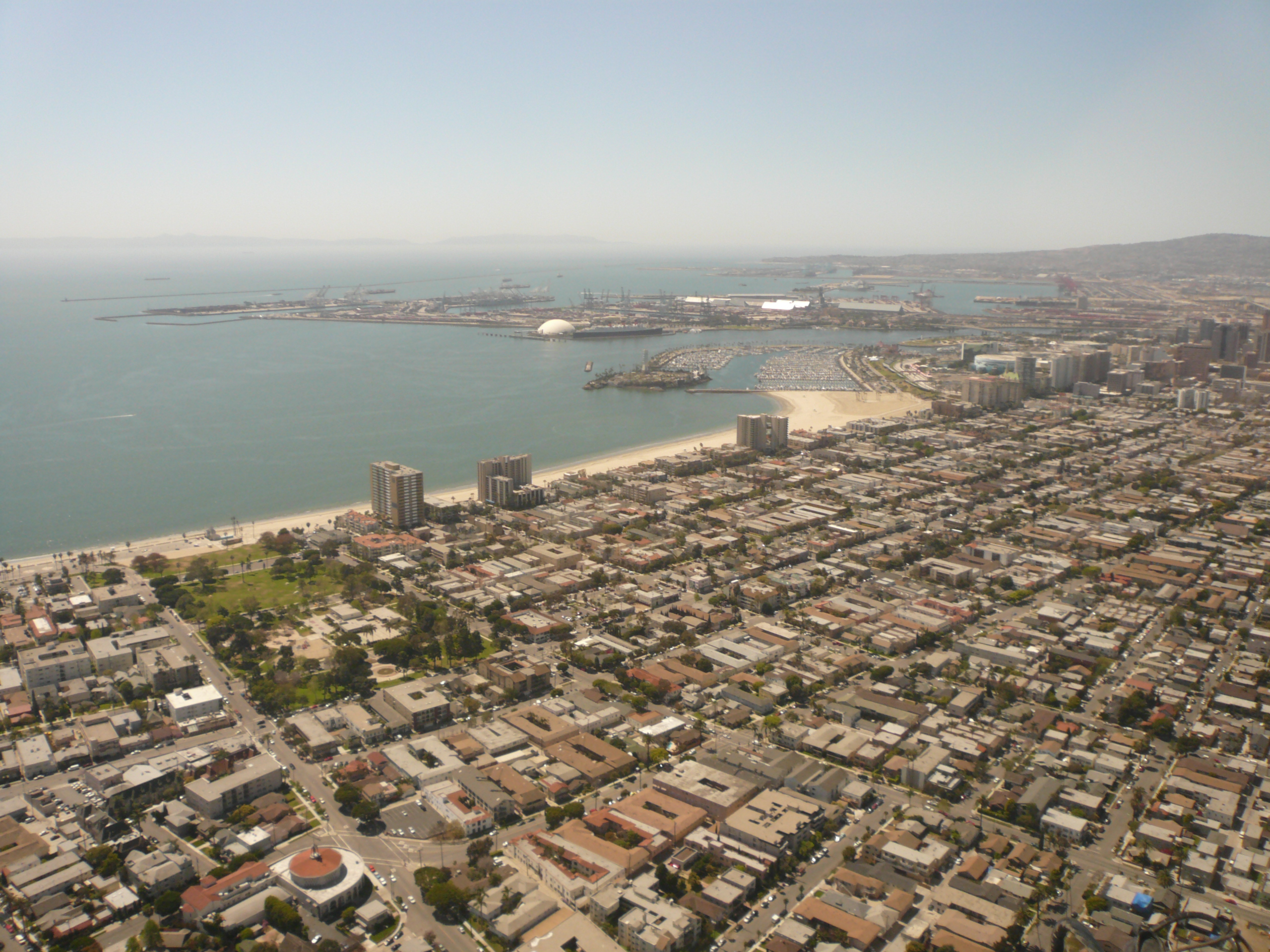
The Alamitos Beach neighborhood of Long Beach, California, looking southwest. The Alamitos Beach neighborhood is in the center of this photo.

The neighborhood was laid out in the 1920s, and many of its buildings date back to that era. As a result, there are many two-story-building setting, and with many conveniences only a short walk away. The urban yet human-scale neighborhood makes this section of Long Beach unique among beach communities in Los Angeles and neighboring Orange Counties.

The historic Ebell Club is located in the district.

=== Nightlife ===
Alamitos Beach is known for its vibrant nightlife and for its significant LGBT community. The Broadway Corridor business district in Alamitos Beach is home to many well-established bars, restaurants, and other businesses that are mostly gay-owned and operated or cater especially to the Lesbian, Gay, Bisexual and Transgender community. The coffee houses and restaurants, which typically remain open until at least midnight, are "gay-friendly" but also serve a large straight clientele. The 4th Street Corridor, along the constituting northern border of Alamitos Beach, is where bars are located. The shops and restaurants along Shoreline Village and the Pike are also within walking distance.

=== Events ===
Ocean Blvd is the home of many city events, including the Toyota Grand Prix, Long Beach Marathon, the Long Beach Pride Parade, and the Amgen Tour of California Bike Race to name a few.

== Politics ==
Alamitos Beach is part of Long Beach's 2nd Council district, and is represented by Councilwoman Cindy Allen.

== Architecture ==
- Harvey H. Lochridge - Minnie E. Butler House
- James C. Beer Residence
- Raphael A. Nicholais, Charles T. McGrew - Ebell of Long Beach
- Richard D. King - Villa Riviera
- William J. Esser

== 2028 Summer Olympics and Paralympics ==
Alamitos Beach is scheduled to host the beach volleyball competitions during the 2028 Summer Olympics in Los Angeles. It will also host blind football during the 2028 Summer Paralympics.Temporary courts and seating will be constructed on the beach to accommodate athletes, officials, and spectators, in a similar manner to previous Olympic beach volleyball venues.

== In popular culture ==
Alamitos Beach appears in:

- Blow
- The O.C.
- Lethal Weapon
- Dexter
- Body Double

== Gallery ==
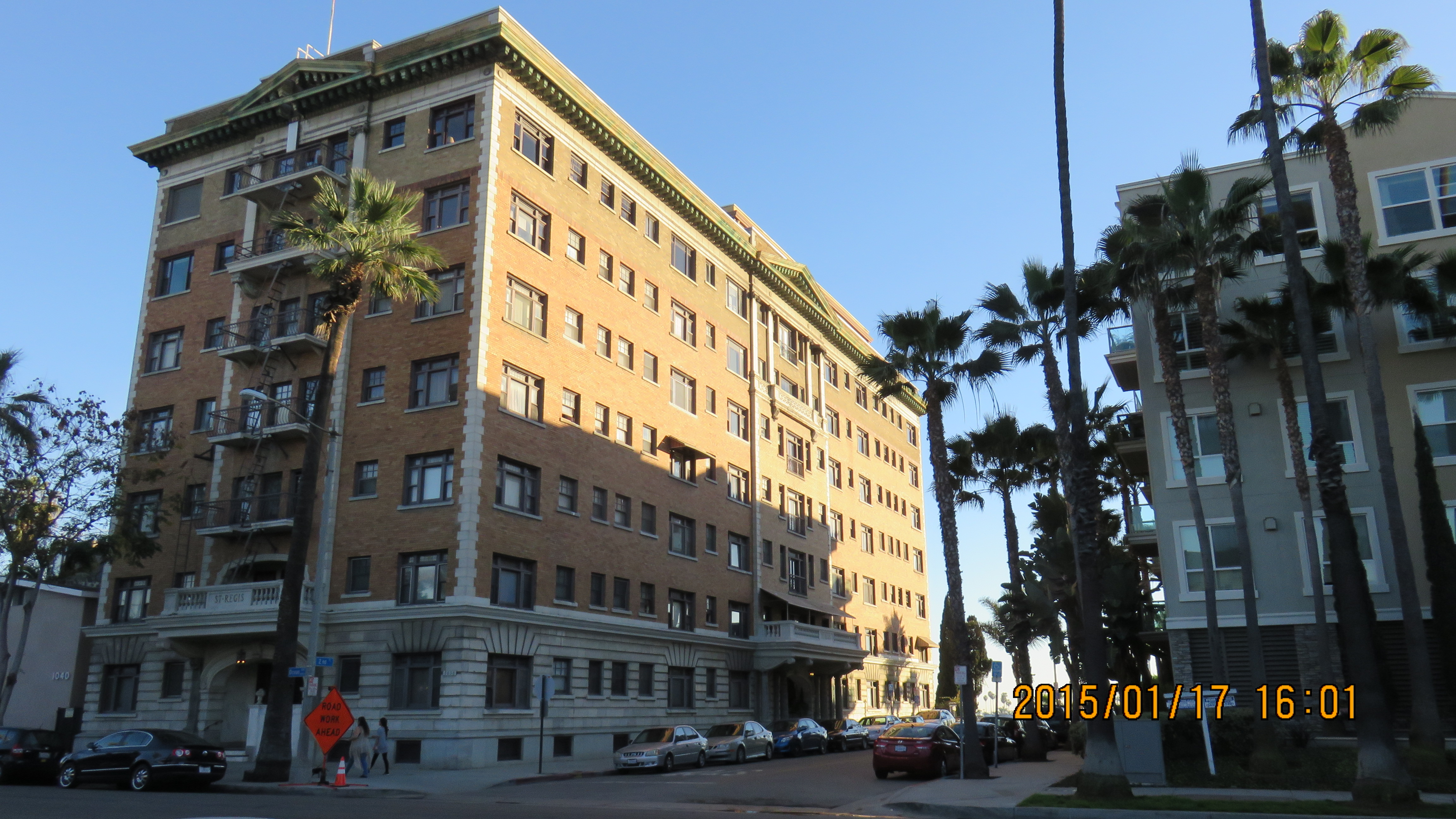
St. Regis Condominiums, constructed 1922

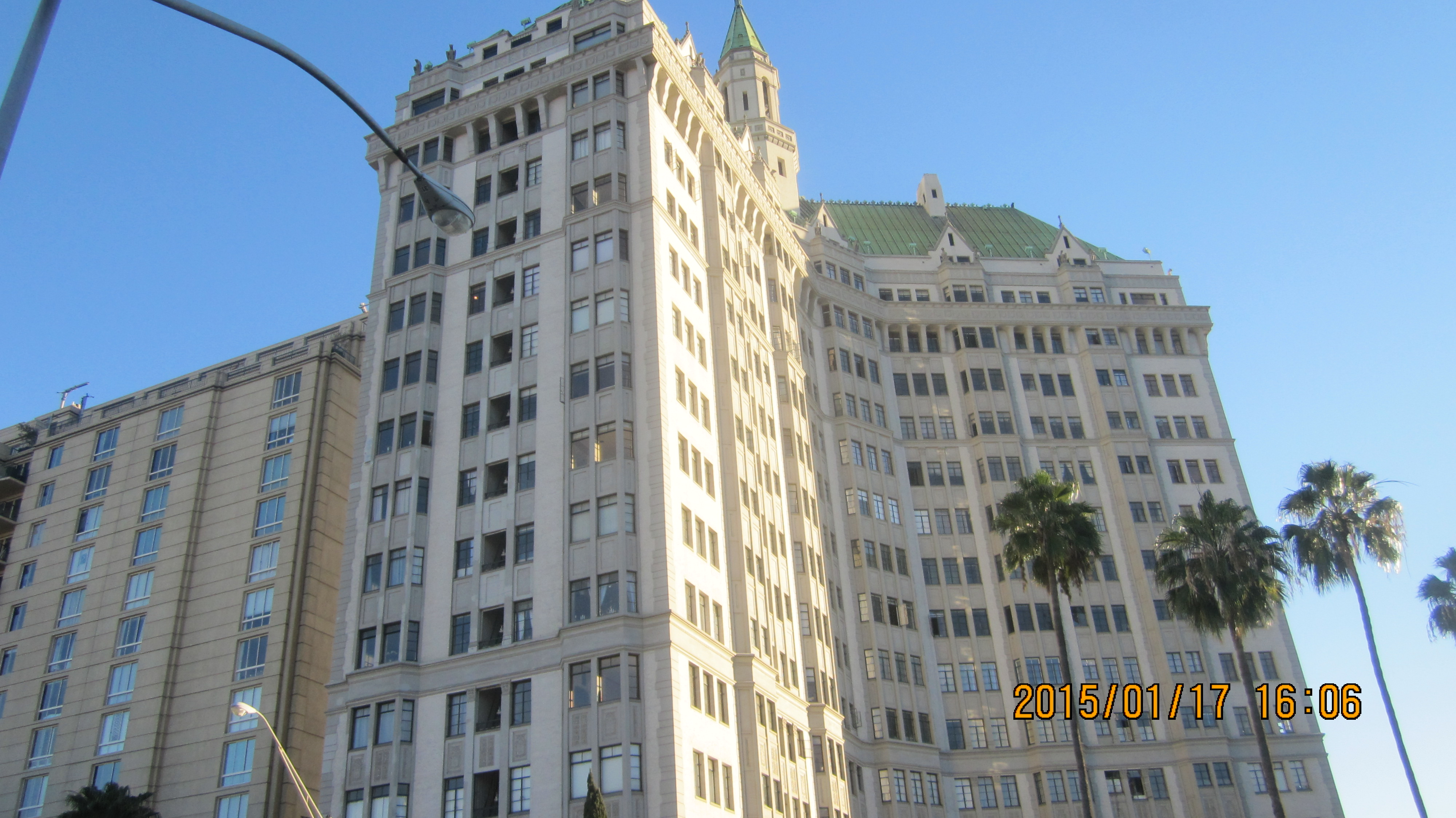
Villa Riviera

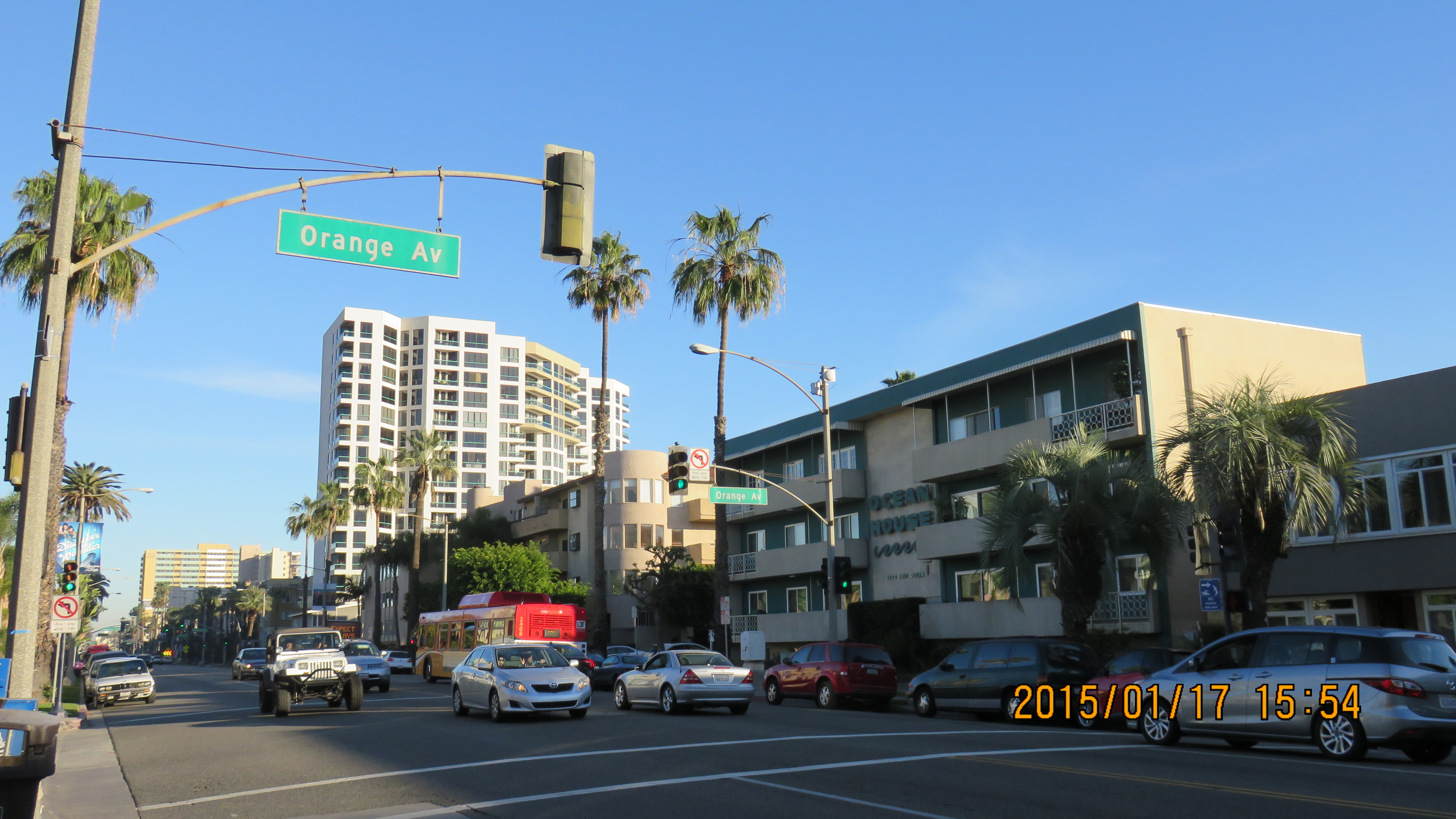
Ocean Blvd. and Orange Ave.

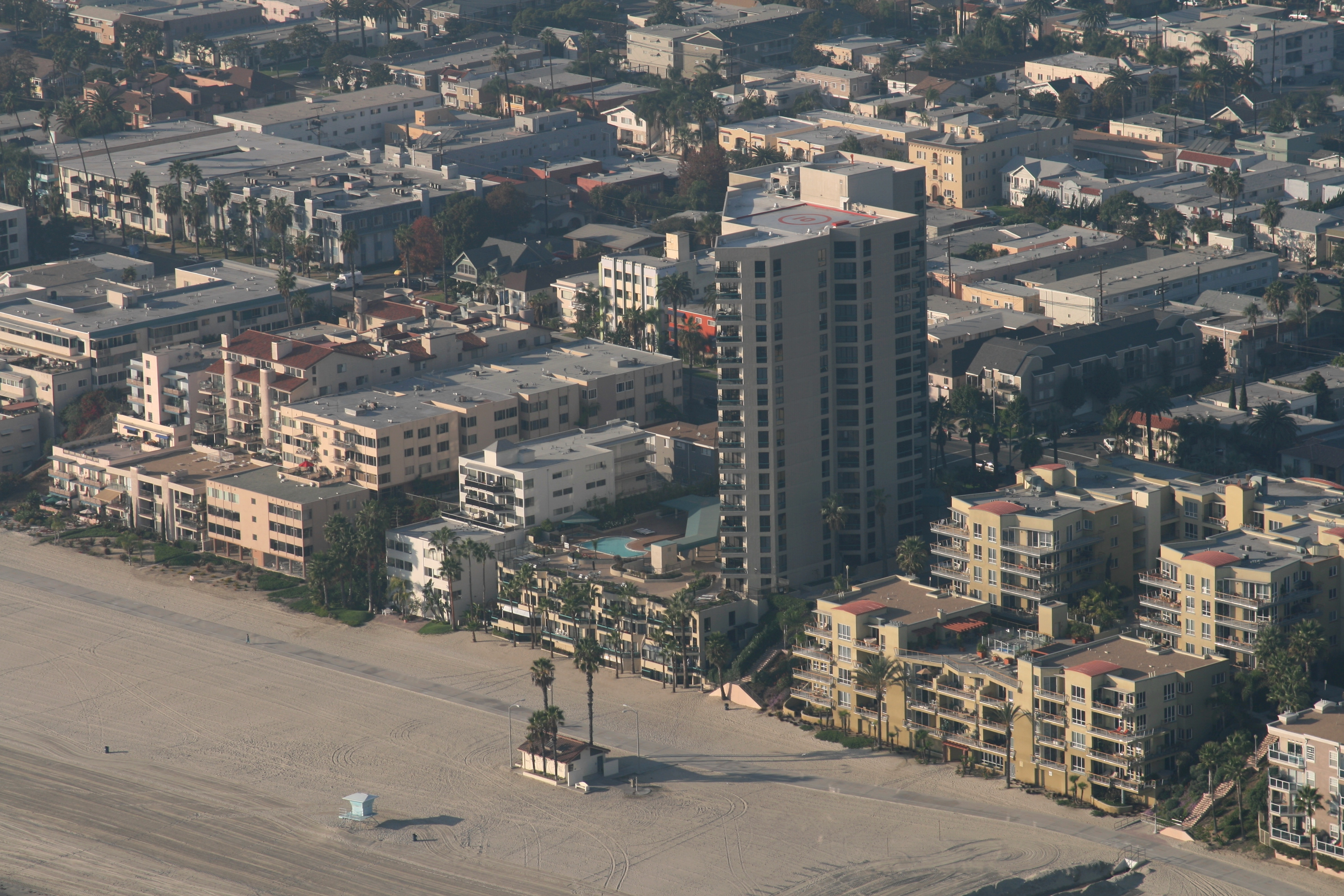
Alamitos Beach

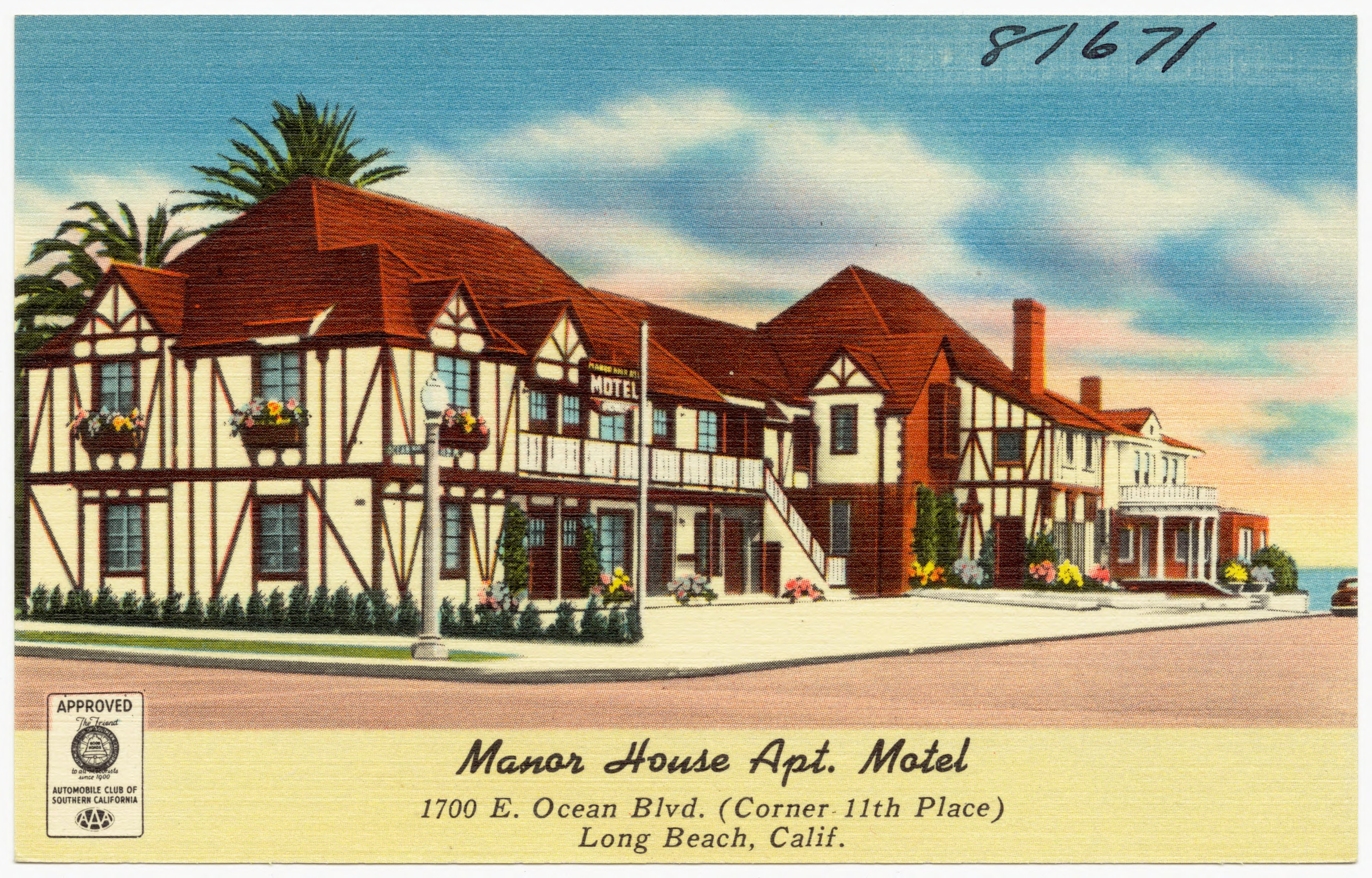
Manor House Apartment Motel, 1700 E. Ocean Blvd., circa 1930 to 1945

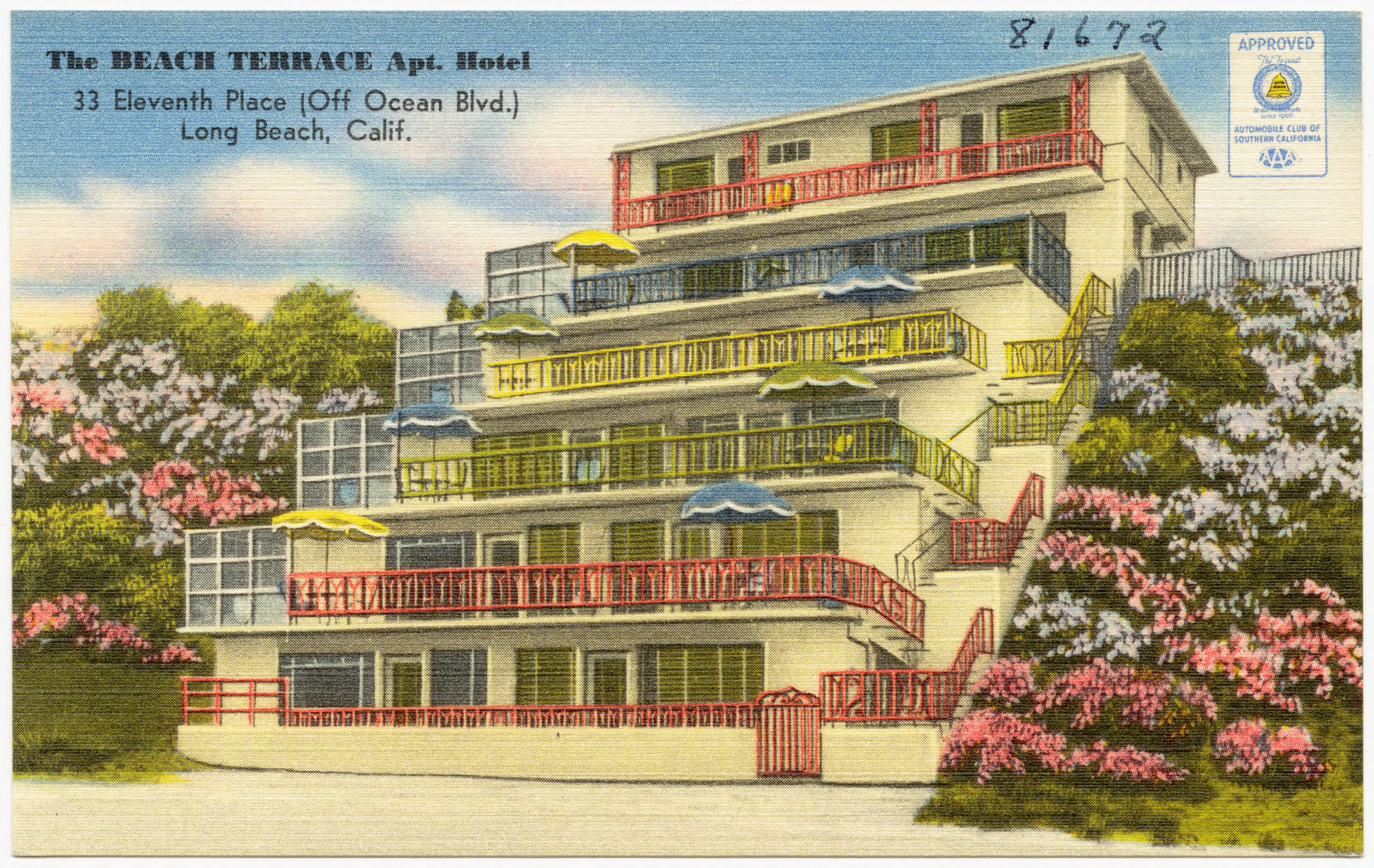
The Beach Terrace Apartment Hotel, 33 Eleventh Place, circa 1930 to 1945

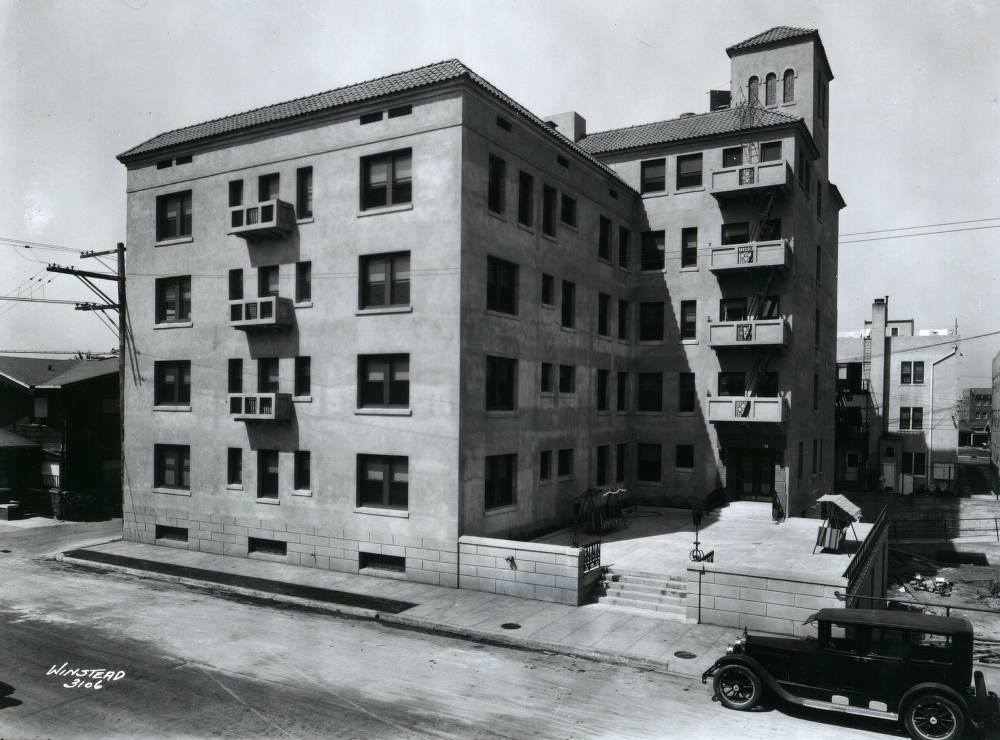
Ambassador Apartments, circa 1925

== See also ==
- Broadway Corridor, Long Beach, California
- Rancho Los Alamitos
- Long Beach Jane Doe
