= Lakewood Village, Long Beach, California =

Lakewood Village
- Neighborhood of Long Beach
- Nickname: The Village
- Interactive map of Lakewood Village
- Coordinates: 33.8408°N 118.1321°W
- Country: United States
- State: California
- County: Los Angeles
- City: Long Beach

Lakewood Village, or simply known as The Village, is a neighborhood in the northeast portion of the city of Long Beach, California. It is bordered on the west, north and east sides by the City of Lakewood. It is located south of Del Amo Boulevard, north of Carson Street, east of Lakewood Boulevard and west of Bellflower Boulevard.

== History ==
Between 1869 and 1897, the Rancho Los Cerritos land skyrocketed in value - from $5,000 for the entire ranch in 1869, to $50 an acre in 1897—when the Bixby Investment Company sold to the brothers William A. Clark and J. Ross Clark of Montana. In 1897, the Clarks purchased 8,139 acres of rancho land for $405,000. The land extended from Signal Hill to Bellflower and from Cherry Avenue to the San Gabriel River.

In 1904, the future sites of the City of Lakewood and of the Lakewood Village in the City of Long Beach came under the ownership of the Clarks' newly formed Montana Land Company. The farming operation was named "Montana Ranch", with 2,000 acres of the land devoted to sugar beets and the remainder of the acreage was devoted to raising alfalfa and to pasture for dairy cattle and sheep.

When William A. Clark and his brother J. Ross Clark died (in 1925 and 1936 respectively), management of the Montana Ranch passed to J. Ross Clark's nephew, Clark J. Bonner, a Los Angeles insurance executive. When the Los Alamitos sugar mill closed in 1926, due to declining beet production, Bonner envisioned turning part of the Montana Ranch into an upper-middle-class suburb to take advantage of the local real estate boom due to the discovery of oil wells. The new subdivision was a leisurely commute from downtown Long Beach, removed from the smells and noise of the oil fields around Signal Hill, and 25 miles away from downtown Los Angeles.

By the early 1930s, Bonner has filed his plans and turned to noted Charles B. Hopper to subdivide the land and sell house lots. In August 1932, the Los Angeles Times announced "Huge New Tract Launched; 9,000 Acre Development Near Los Alamitos Being Built Around Golf Course Project." It is suggested that Bonner selected the name "Lakewood" because 1) the land featured boggy remains of the former Bouton Lake, and 2) he named it after the winter resort of Lakewood, New Jersey where his uncle William A. Clark had built estates at the end of the 19th century.

Several houses had been built in the rural area known as Lakewood Village. The houses were favored with a pleasant setting and the proximity of the Lakewood Country Club. It has been suggested that Bouton Lake, located on the golf course and formed in 1895 when drilling operations opened an artesian well, is the source for the name “Lakewood.”

The Second World War began an era of profound change for the future Lakewood area. The Douglas Aircraft Company completed a massive defense plant and home for the Douglas workers were begun in what is now Lakewood Village. Yet even as the defense workers moved into their new homes, the fields between South Street and Lakewood Village remained empty.

By 1949, most of the land comprising west Lakewood—some 3,500 acres (14 km^{2})—had been purchased for nearly $9 million by Louis Boyar, Ben Weingart, and Mark Taper. From their experience as homebuilders in Long Beach and Norwalk, they knew that the Lakewood area was ready for planned development. Together, they formed the Lakewood Park Corporation and, with the financial assistance of the Prudential Insurance Company, began building the first of 17,000 new homes. Lakewood Village was annexed by Long Beach in 1953, which spurred residents who did not want annexation to form the city of Lakewood which surrounds Lakewood Village on the west, north, and east sides.

== Setting ==
A number of architectural styles are found in this neighborhood, with styles including: English Tudor, Cape Cod, Country, French Country, Medieval, Ranch, Spanish Colonial, Mediterranean, Contemporary, Asian, Tropical/Tiki, Streamline Moderne/Art Deco, Craftsman, and many more.

Lakewood Village is located in the center of the Lakewood/Long Beach area, and is close to the 91, 710, 605 and 405 Freeways. Lakewood Village is part of the 90808 ZIP Code that also includes communities such as the El Dorado Park Estates, Los Altos, and Rancho Park Estates.

== The Village Shoppes ==
Along Viking Way (the southeast corner of Lakewood Village). Since the 1950s, "Parkview Village" (originally known as "The Triangle") has included a collection of shops, restaurants, and service providers along Viking Way and Village Road in the heart of the residential community of Lakewood Village. The Village is located at the intersection of Bellflower Boulevard and Carson Street adjacent to Heartwell Park and the Long Beach City College Liberal Arts Campus, and near Long Beach Municipal Airport and Skylinks Golf Course. Parkview Village has the characteristics of an outdoor shopping "main street" with over 100,000 square feet (10,000 m^{2}) and more than seventy businesses.

Along Norse Way (the southwest corner of Lakewood Village). This shopping center, built in 1941, was originally used by the Douglas Aircraft Company workers. The Sunnyspot Diner, Bank of America, grocery store and ration stamp office have since left. It was the beginning of Lonnies Sporting Goods, Rex L. Hodges Real Estate and the First Lakewood Village Walk In Theater. Rexall Drugs and a malt shop are fond memories of early LBCC Students. A wide variety of stores and businesses are offered along this street. One can find several restaurants ranging from Thai, Vietnamese, Chinese, Greek, Mexican, and even Classic American food from Dale's Diner. These shops are located near the intersection of Lakewood Boulevard and Carson Street. Many of these businesses offer discounts to Boeing employees since Boeing is located just across the street. The shops are also near the Long Beach City College Liberal Arts Campus.

== Schools ==
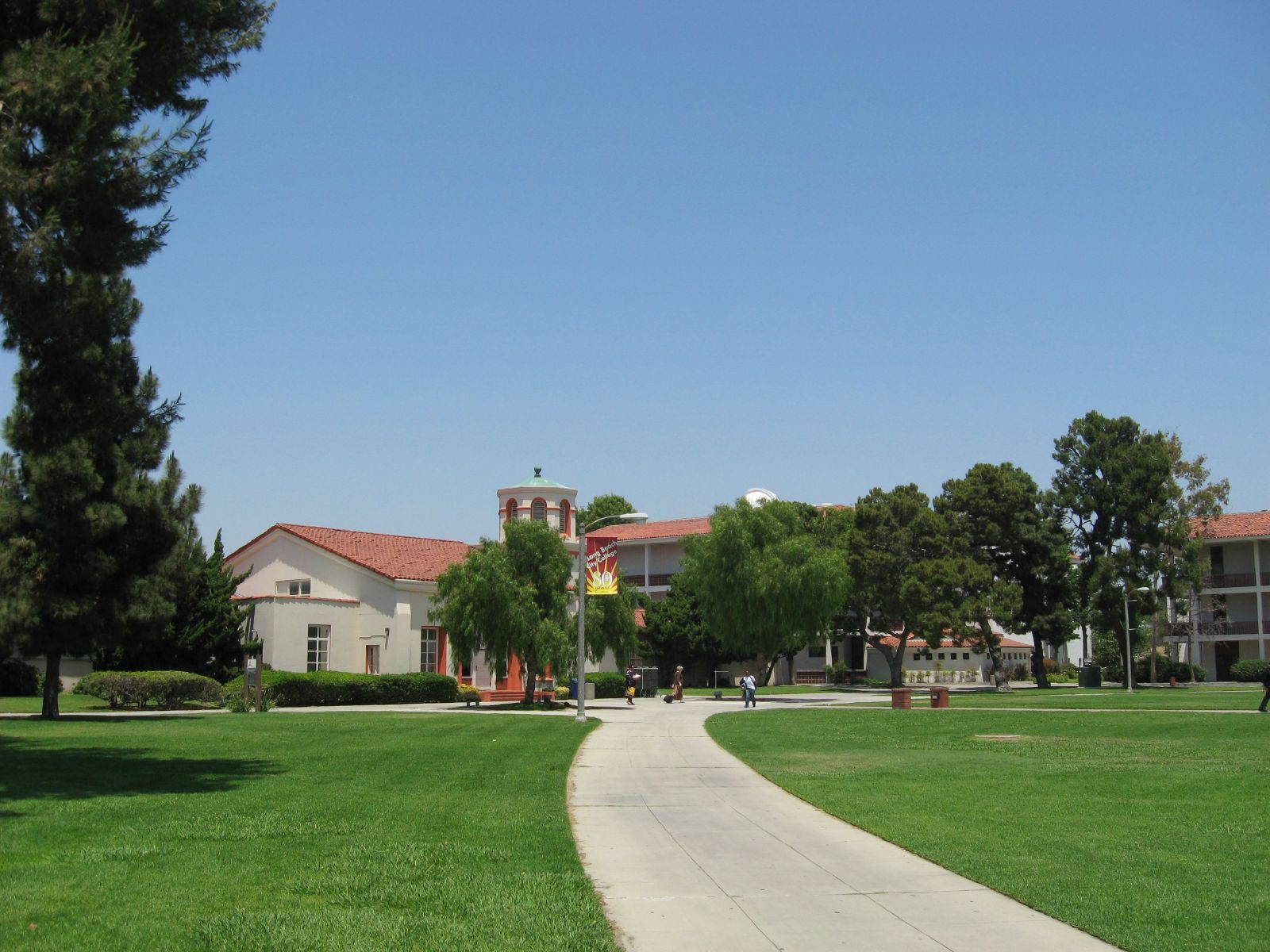
The Long Beach City College's Liberal Arts Campus is located in Lakewood Village

Part of the Long Beach Unified School District, this area's schools include Mark Twain Elementary School and Bancroft Middle School, both California Distinguished Elementary Schools. There are several Christian elementary schools at local churches in the Village. The area high school is Lakewood High School. Long Beach City College's Liberal Arts Campus is also located in the Village.

== Notable residents ==
- Ralph Luther Criswell - Los Angeles City Council member, 1925–27, and later a lobbyist for the Boulder Dam project
- Barbara Boylan - dancer from the Lawrence Welk Show

== See also ==
- Neighborhoods of Long Beach, California
