= Addams, Long Beach, California =

Addams
- Neighborhood of Long Beach
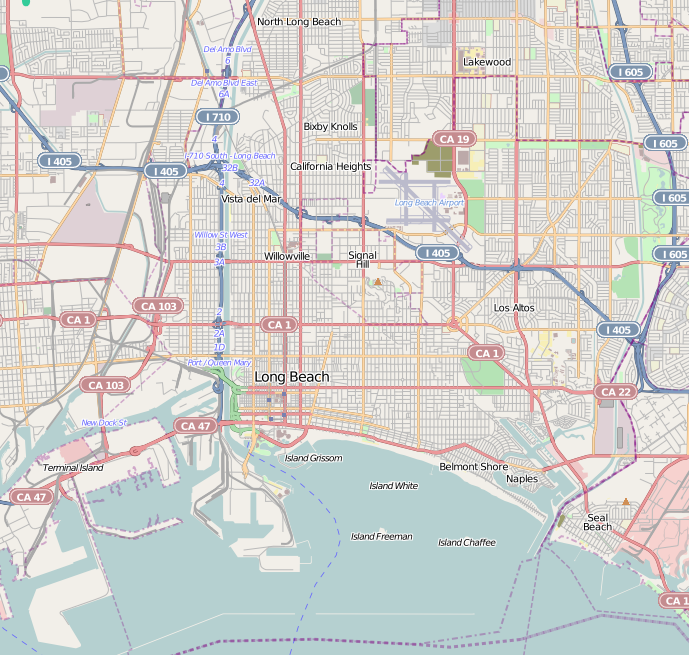
- Location within Long Beach, California Location within Los Angeles metropolitan area Location within California Location within the United States Addams (the United States)
- Coordinates: 33.8496°N 118.1899°W
- Country: United States
- State: California
- County: Los Angeles
- City: Long Beach

Addams is a neighborhood in Long Beach, California. It lies within the North Long Beach area. The neighborhood is named for Addams Elementary School, in turn named for the activist Jane Addams, and is home to the Jane Addams Neighborhood Association.

Grace Park is named to honor the nationally recognized herpetologist Grace Olive Wiley, who lived in the district.

== See also ==
- Neighborhoods of Long Beach, California
