= Hellman, Long Beach, California =

Coordinates: 33.777215°N 118.173339°W

Hellman, California
- Neighborhood of Long Beach
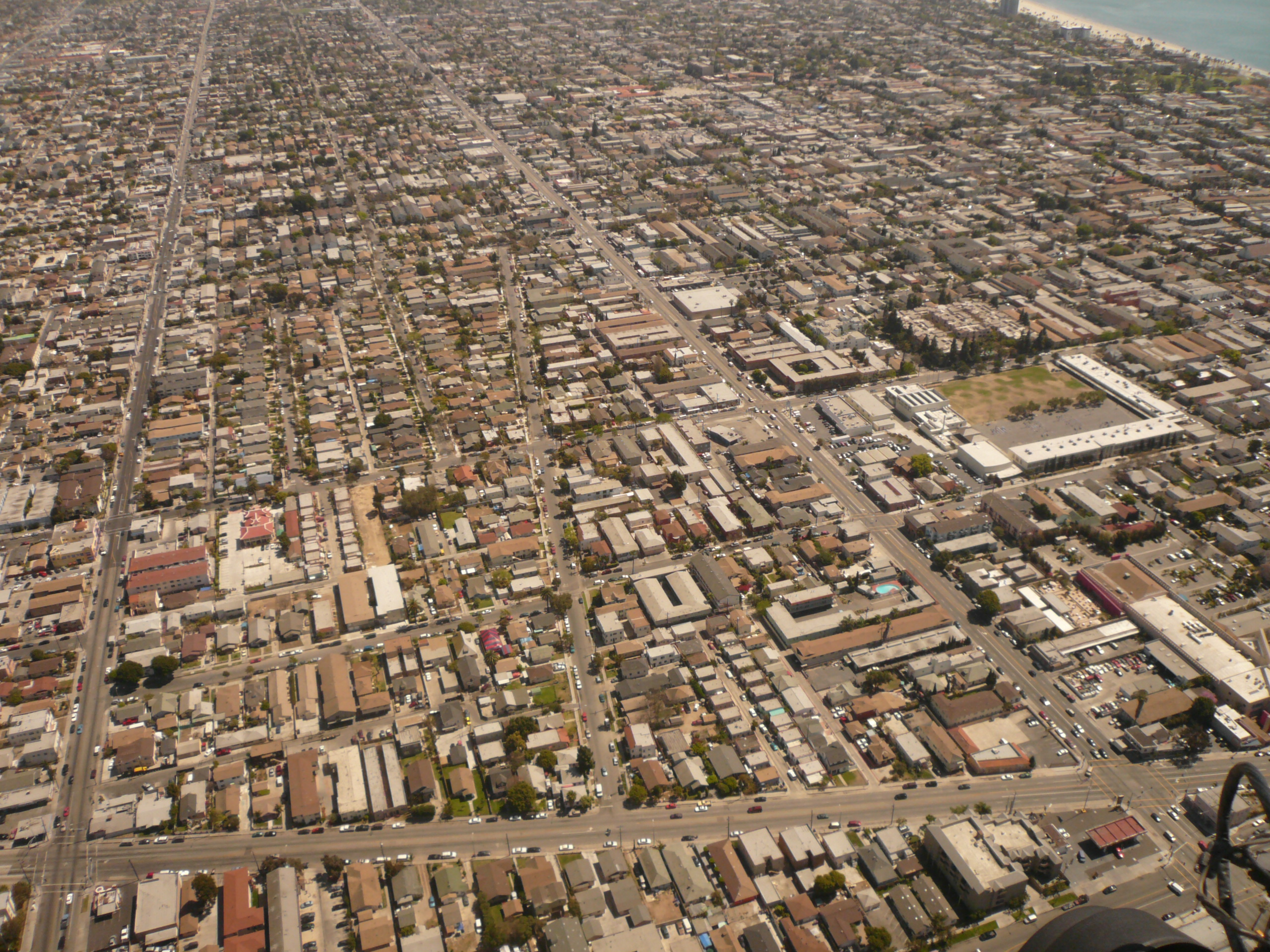
- The Hellman neighborhood of Long Beach, California, seen from the air, facing southeast. Alamitos Avenue runs across the photo at the bottom, 7th Street runs from the bottom right corner to the top of the photo, and 10th Street runs from the bottom left to the top. Hellman Street cuts diagonally across the center.
- Interactive map of Hellman, California
- Country: United States
- State: California
- County: Los Angeles
- City: Long Beach

Hellman is a neighborhood in the city of Long Beach, California.

== Hellman Street/Craftsman Historic District ==
This area is located north of 7th Street, south of 10th Street, between Orange & Walnut Ave.

A high concentration of Craftsman bungalows, built for middle-class working families, remains intact today in this district. Secondary "contributing" structures are Spanish Colonial Revival and Victorian.

Isaias W. Hellman, businessman, financier and real estate developer prominent in Los Angeles and Long Beach, is credited with developing this neighborhood. Hellman Street bears his name.

== Location ==
The greater Hellman neighborhood is bordered by Alamitos Avenue to the west, Anaheim Street to the north, Cherry Avenue to the east, and 7th Street to the south.

To the west of Hellman is the East Village and to the north is Cambodia Town, to the east is Rose Park and to the south is North Alamitos Beach (NABA).

== See also ==
- Neighborhoods of Long Beach, California
