= El Dorado South, Long Beach, California =

Coordinates: 33.792°N 118.099°W

El Dorado South
- Neighborhood of Long Beach
- Interactive map of El Dorado South
- Country: United States
- State: California
- County: Los Angeles
- City: Long Beach

El Dorado Park South is a neighborhood located on the east side of Long Beach. It is a residential neighborhood close to the El Dorado Regional Park and the 605 and 405 Freeways. The neighborhood of El Dorado Park South is very close to the Seal Beach City line and is on the Orange and Los Angeles County line.

== Location ==
El Dorado Park South is bounded by El Dorado Regional Park on the north, Studebaker Road on the west, Atherton on the South and a flood control channel in the east.

== See also ==
- Neighborhoods of Long Beach, California
