= Park Estates, Long Beach, California =

Coordinates: 33.783°N 118.128°W

Park Estates
- Neighborhood of Long Beach
- Interactive map of Park Estates
- Country: United States
- State: California
- County: Los Angeles
- City: Long Beach

Park Estates is a neighborhood in Long Beach, California. It is adjacent to the Los Altos and Alamitos Heights neighborhoods, as well as Recreation Park and California State University, Long Beach.

== History ==
The neighborhood was developed by Lloyd Whaley in 1948.

== Architecture ==
- Kenneth S. Wing
- Paul Tay
- John Lautner - Alexander House
- Lloyd Wright
- Paul R. Williams - residence of Lloyd Whaley
- Richard Neutra - Hafley House

== See also ==
- Neighborhoods of Long Beach, California
