= Sunrise, Long Beach, California =

- Neighborhood of Long Beach
- Harnett House on Sunrise Blvd. Courtesy of Google Street View
- Interactive map of Sunrise, Long Beach, California
- Coordinates: 33.8029°N 118.1835°W
- State: California
- County: Los Angeles
- City: Long Beach

Population (2010)
  - Total: 6,911
- US Census

Sunrise, also known as Sunrise Boulevard, is a neighborhood in the city of Long Beach, California. In 1990, the City of Long Beach by Ordinance C-6834 designated this neighborhood as the "Sunrise Boulevard Historic Landmark District."

== History ==
Originally a ranch, then a milk sanitarium, this neighborhood developed adjacent to the Pacific Electric Railway Balboa Line. Homes are predominantly Craftsman Bungalows, constructed between 1908 and 1924, ranging from large mansions to small-scale workers' housing.

An early motor court, the El Cortez, was built in 1937 at 767 E Sunrise Blvd., on the site of the sanitarium. It is now the El Cortez Motor Court Apartments.

Today this district is a blend of small-scale bungalows, large-scale Craftsman houses, and mid-scale bungalows in the Craftsman and Spanish Colonial Revival styles.

== Location ==
Sunrise is bordered by the Pacific Electric Railway right-of-way to the south, the city of Signal Hill to the east, Willow Street to the north, and Atlantic Avenue to the west.

To the south of Sunrise is the Central Long Beach area and to the west is Wrigley, and the city of Signal Hill is to the north and east.

== Architecture ==
- Kenneth Wing, Sr. - Harnett House

== See also ==
- Neighborhoods of Long Beach, California
