= Los Altos, Long Beach, California =

Neighborhood in Long Beach, California

Coordinates: 33.797156°N 118.118662°W

Los Altos
- Neighborhood of Long Beach
- Interactive map of Los Altos
- Country: United States
- State: California
- County: Los Angeles
- City: Long Beach

Los Altos is a residential neighborhood located in eastern Long Beach.

== Location ==
Los Altos is bounded by Clark Avenue on the west, Studebaker Road on the east, Interstate 405 and Willow Street on the north, and CSU Long Beach on the South. Its borders meet with Whaley Park and the Traffic Circle area on the west, El Dorado South on the east, South of Conant and Plaza on the north, and Park Estates and CSU Long Beach on the south.

== Schools ==
William F. Prisk Elementary School, Florence Bixby Elementary School, Minnie Gant Elementary School, Stanford Middle School and Robert A. Millikan High School are located in Los Altos. The Los Altos YMCA is located on Bellflower Boulevard and The California State University at Long Beach is in Los Altos.

== Parks ==
In November 2018, a new state of the art park featuring an art and music theme was constructed at Whaley Park in Los Altos. The park was built with infrastructure funds from Measure A tax dollars which Long Beach voters passed in 2016.

== Economy ==
Los Altos Center, a power center (big-box center), formerly a regional mall with major department stores, currently anchored by Target department store, Trader Joe's, Lazy Acres grocery store, and LA Fitness. It used to also anchor an Sears store.

== Transportation ==
There are two freeways (the 405 and 605) within a short drive, providing easy travel to distant locations. Long Beach Airport is nearby.

== See also ==
- Neighborhoods of Long Beach, California
