= Houghton Park =

- Neighborhood of Long Beach
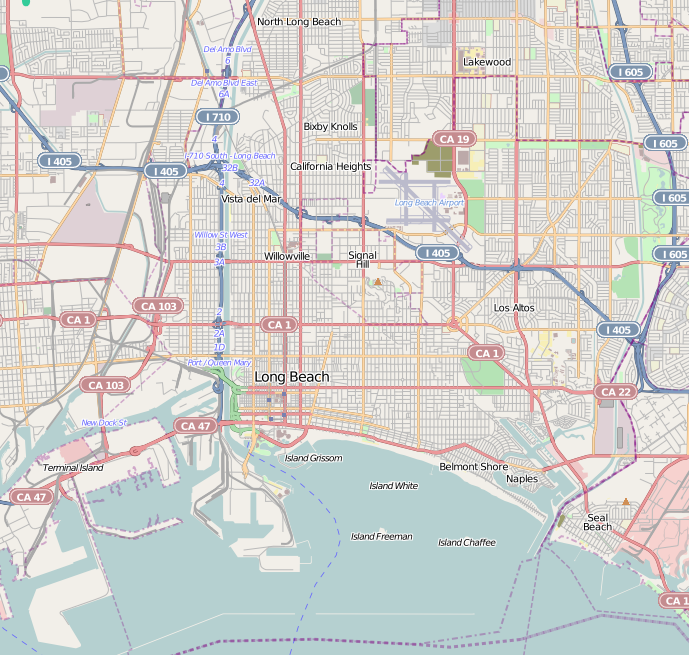
- Location within Long Beach, California Location within the Los Angeles metropolitan area Location within southern California Location within California Location within the United States
- Coordinates: 33°52′2.36″N 118°10′55.39″W
- Country: United States
- State: California
- County: Los Angeles
- City: Long Beach

Houghton Park is a neighborhood in North Long Beach, California. Houghton Park is bounded by Orange Avenue to the east, Atlantic Avenue to the west, Artesia Boulevard to the north, and Harding Street to the south.

== History ==
Three acres of land for Houghton Park was donated on July 30, 1924 by Stanley W., Dove C., and Elizabeth P. Houghton, in memory of their father Col. Sherman Otis Houghton and his wife Eliza Donner Houghton, the orphaned daughter of the fateful Donner party that died in the snow pack at Donner Lake in 1846. Col. Sherman Otis Houghton bought the 78-acre ranch in North Long Beach in 1896 that included the present Houghton Park and lived there from 1898 until his death in 1914. He was the first representative from Southern California in the U.S. Congress from 1871 to 1875.

One more acre was donated by the real estate firm, Zimmerman and Dyer. The City of Long Beach then purchased 24.88 acres from the Houghton family on May 9, 1927.

Palm trees planted by Stanley Houghton remain. The park's community recreation center now stands where the barn stood. There is no record for the construction of the original section of the community recreation center, called a clubhouse at that time. It included an auditorium style area with a stage and an adjoining kitchen. The evidence provided by the architectural style indicates that it was constructed in the 1930s.

On June 25, 1947, the Park Commission approved the location of a canteen building in the northeast corner of the park. An old building was moved in and served until the park was redeveloped from 1959 to 1961. The clubhouse was expanded to include a canteen to serve the recreational interests of the boys and girls attending Jordan High School and the freestanding building removed. In 1973 a Neighborhood Facilities Center was built with federal grants and houses programs of the Department of Health and Human Services and the Council Field office.

In 1987, the community recreation center was again expanded to add a senior citizen's center. This addition included three multi-purpose rooms and a reading room. The park includes three baseball diamonds, a soccer field overlay on the baseball diamonds and a separate soccer field, a playground, tennis courts, basketball courts, and a skate park built in 2004. Renovation of the baseball fields, playground, and sports field lights occurred with funding from the Los Angeles County Safe Neighborhood Parks Bond Acts of 1992 and 1996.

Inside the park is the Long Beach Vietnam Veterans Memorial, completed in 2000. The memorial's plaque commemorates 103 local area soldiers who perished in the Vietnam War. The memorial has been subject to vandalism.
