= Neighborhoods of Long Beach, California =

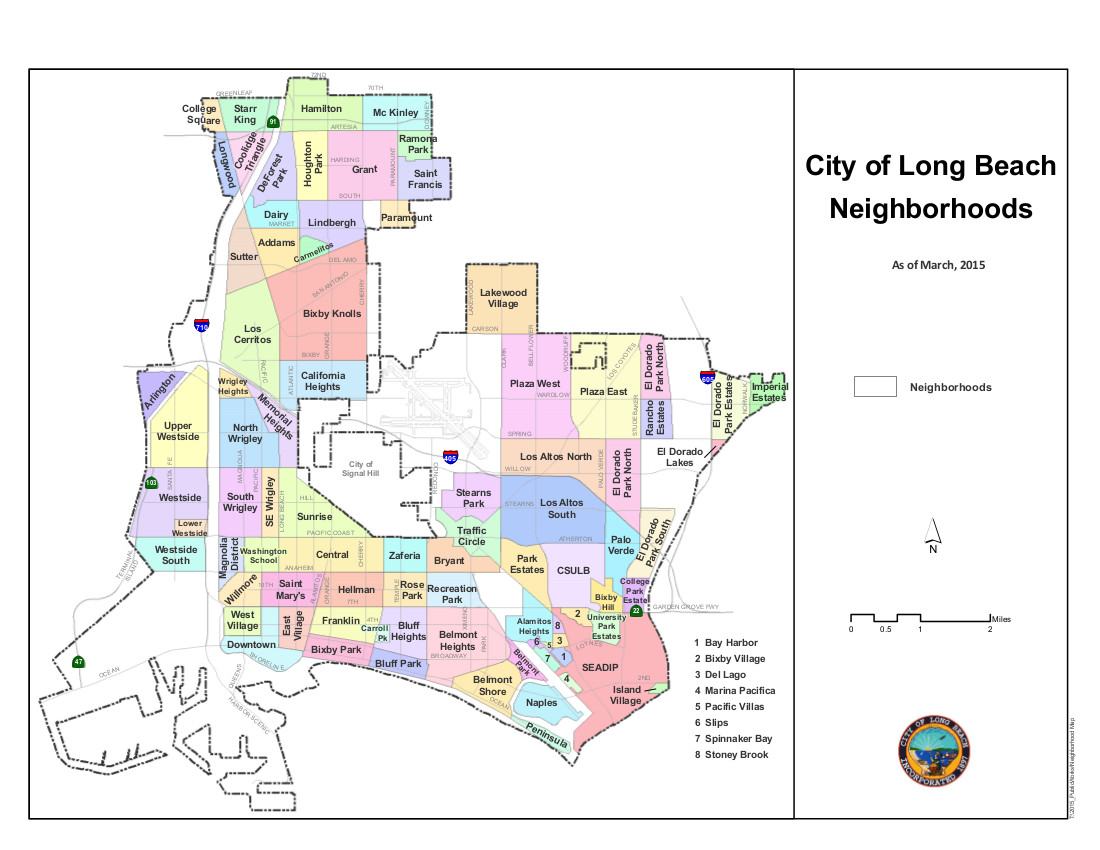
Neighborhood map of the City of Long Beach, California

Long Beach, California, is composed of many different neighborhoods. Some neighborhoods are named after thoroughfares, while others are named for nearby parks, schools, or city features.

== Officially recognized neighborhoods ==
Location
4th Street Corridor
7th Street
Addams
Alamitos Beach
Alamitos Heights
Arlington
Bay Harbor
Belmont Heights
Belmont Park
Belmont Shore
Bixby Hill
Bixby Knolls
Bixby Park
Bixby Village
Bluff Heights
Bluff Park
Bryant
California Heights
Cambodia Town
Carmelitos
Carroll Park
Central Area
College Park Estates
College Square
Coolidge Triangle
Cypress
Dairy
DeForest Park
Del Lago
Downtown Long Beach
East Village
El Dorado Lakes
El Dorado Park Estates
El Dorado North
El Dorado South
Franklin Neighborhood
Hamilton Neighborhood
Hellman
Houghton Park, North Long Beach
Imperial Estates
Island Village
Lakewood Village
Lindbergh Neighborhood
Longwood
Los Altos
Los Cerritos/Virginia Country Club
Lower West Side
Magnolia District
Marina Pacifica
McKinley Neighborhood
Memorial Heights
Naples
Nehyam (formerly Grant)
Palo Verde
Paramount Neighborhood
Park Estates
Peninsula
Plaza
Ramona Park
Rancho Estates
Recreation Park
Rose Park
St. Francis
Saint Mary's (St. Mary Medical Center)
SEADIP
Starr King
Stearns Park
Sunrise
Sutter
Traffic Circle
Upper Westside
University Park Estates
Washington School
West Long Beach
West Village
Willmore
Wrigley
Zaferia

== Other neighborhoods ==
- AOC7 (Anaheim, Orange, Cherry and 7th Street)
- Artcraft Manor
- Bixby Highlands
- Bixby Terrace
- Broadway Corridor
- Eastside
- Long Beach Marina
- MacArthur Park Community of Long Beach
- Nihonmachi (East-Central)
- North Alamitos Beach (NABA)
- North Long Beach
- Poly High
- Promenade
- Ridgewood Heights
- Shoreline Marina
- Shoreline Village
- South of Conant
- Terminal Island
- Wrigley Heights
