= North Long Beach, Long Beach, California =

Coordinates: 33.864386°N 118.176896°W

North Long Beach, California
- Neighborhood of Long Beach
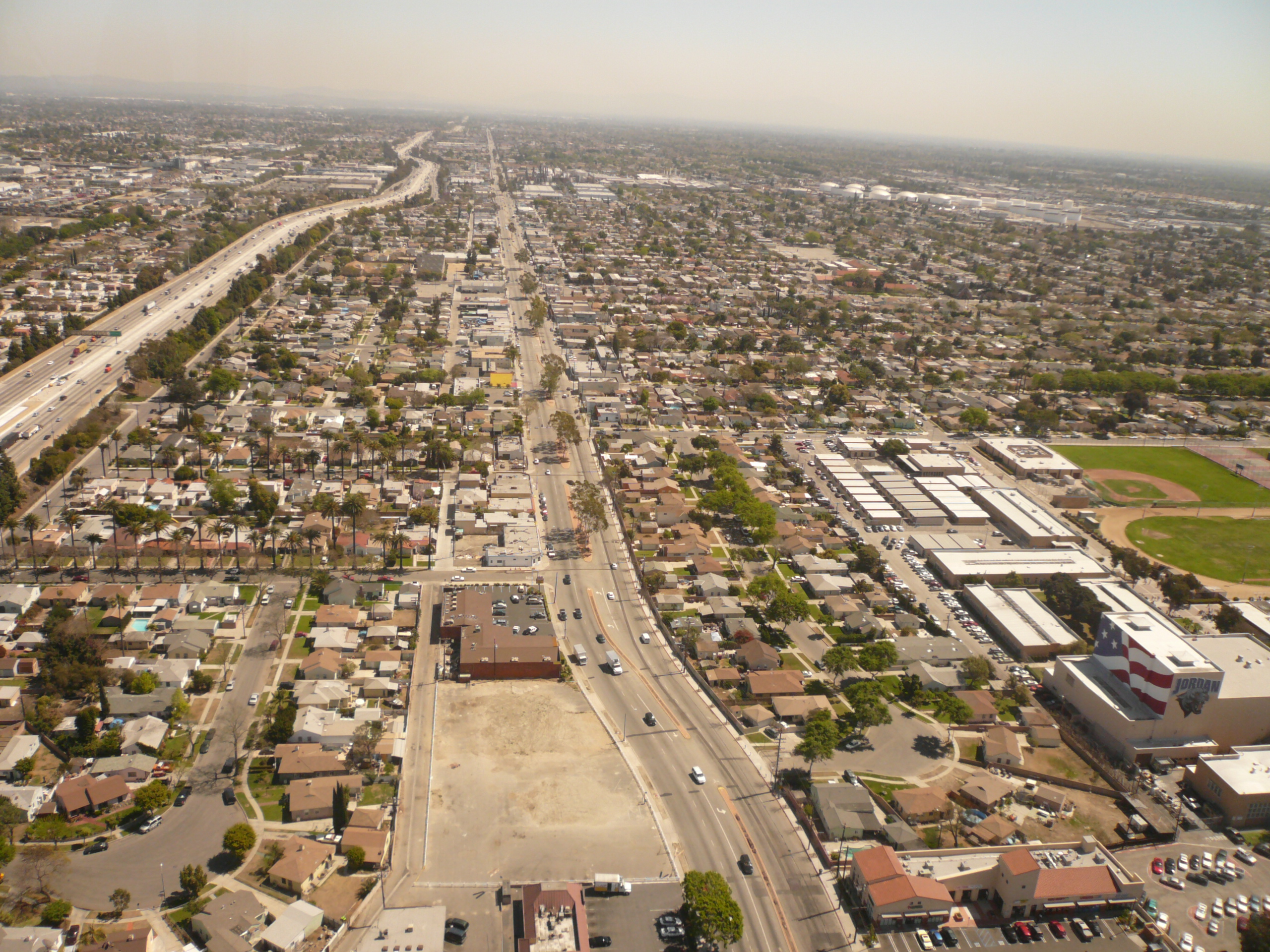
- Neighborhood of North Long Beach in Long Beach, California, looking east along the south side of the 91 freeway.

- Location within the United States
- Country: United States
- State: California
- County: Los Angeles
- City: Long Beach

North Long Beach (also referred to as North Town or Northside) is a predominantly working-class area of Long Beach, California. The neighborhood is bounded to the west, north and east by the Long Beach city limits (the Rancho Dominguez unincorporated county area and the cities of Compton, Paramount, Bellflower and Lakewood), and to the south by a Union Pacific railroad track and the Bixby Knolls neighborhood. The north boundary with Paramount is only a few blocks north of the Artesia Freeway (California State Route 91).

North Long Beach is mostly residential. It is home to the Uptown Business Improvement District, which represents commercial property owners on Atlantic Avenue between Artesia Blvd and Market Street and a portion of Artesia Blvd to Orange Avenue. The organization is run by its President Pasha Darvishian. Long Beach Boulevard, and Cherry Avenue. There are some industrial businesses, mostly along the eastern edge of North Long Beach between Cherry Avenue and Paramount Boulevard, serviced by the Union Pacific Railroad.

The northern end of the district is home to Houghton Park, the Michelle Obama Neighborhood Library of the Long Beach Public Library system, Fire Station 12, and Jordan High School. The southern end includes the Carmelitos housing project and its adjacent small shopping center. On its west side, at approximately Market Street and Long Beach Boulevard, is the site of the original Long Beach civic center dating back to the city's rancho days. The Long Beach Police Department's North Division operates a substation on the corner of Atlantic and Del Amo, at Scherer Park.

North Long Beach is home to a significant population of African-Americans, Cambodians, and Hispanics. Additionally, there exists a considerable Samoan and Tongan community in North Long Beach.

== Demographics ==
According to 2021 U.S. Census estimates, the neighborhood was home to over 93,000 people (roughly one-fifth of the total population of the city). Roughly 69% of the population was Hispanic, roughly 28% were black, roughly 0.9% were non-Hispanic whites, and roughly 1% were Asian.

== Schools ==
North Long Beach is in the Long Beach Unified School District.

- Jordan High School (Main Campus)
- Jordan High School Plus
- Charles Lindbergh Middle School
- Alexander Hamilton Middle School
- Colin Powell School (K-8)
- Ulysses S. Grant Elementary School
- Bret Harte Elementary School
- McKinley Elementary School
- Starr King Elementary School
- Perry Lindsey Middle School
- Dooley Elementary School
- Jane Addams Elementary School

== Special events ==
- Long Beach Veterans Day Parade (Nov.)
- Uptown Jazz Festival

== See also ==
- Neighborhoods of Long Beach, California
