= Plaza, Long Beach, California =

Plaza
- Neighborhood of Long Beach
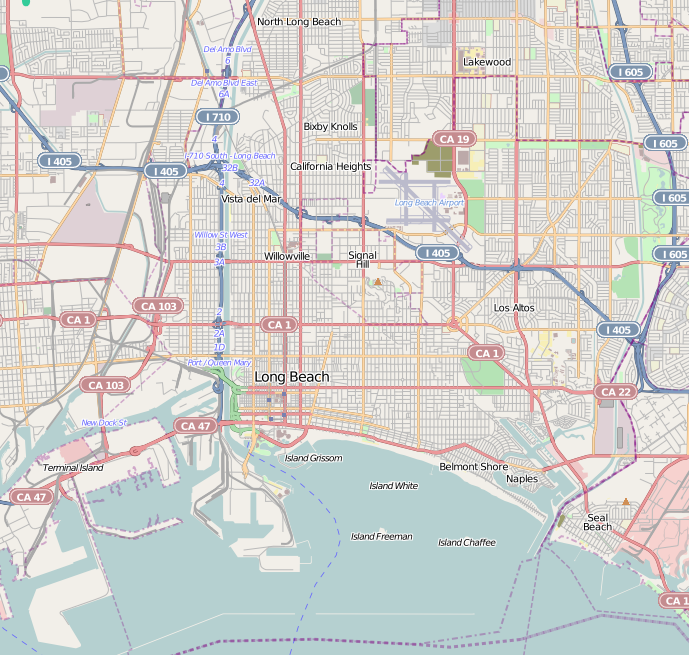
- Location within Long Beach, California Location within Los Angeles metropolitan area Location within California Location within the United States Plaza (the United States)
- Coordinates: 33.8188°N 118.1078°W
- Country: United States
- State: California
- County: Los Angeles
- City: Long Beach
- Postal code: 90815

Plaza is a neighborhood of Long Beach, California, located adjacent to El Dorado Park West. It is part of the greater "East Long Beach" area.

== History ==
Plaza was originally built in several phases as part of the Lakewood, California subdivision Lakewood Plaza. According to the Long Beach Press-Telegram's March 13, 1953 edition, residents in Lakewood Plaza units 3, 4 and 5 voted to become the first Lakewood area choosing to be annexed into Long Beach. The Press-Telegram reported that "the half-mile square area joining the city is bounded by Spring St., Studebaker Rd., Stearns St., and Palo Verde Ave."

Since the early 1960s, various grocery stores have operated at the intersection of Palo Verde and Spring.

The Long Beach neighborhood Plaza is annexed by the city after a March 1953 election.

== Location ==
Plaza is in East Long Beach, entirely north of Interstate 405. Its borders are Stearns Street to the south and Studebaker Road to the east. The western borders are Palo Verde Ave. (to Spring Street) and Woodruff Ave. (to Conant Street). East Long Beach's primary shopping and dining district, East Spring Street, is located in the Plaza area.

== Education ==
Plaza residents are served by Long Beach Unified School District schools:

- Cubberley K-8 School
- Emerson Parkside Academy
- Leland Stanford Middle School
- Millikan High School

== See also ==
- Neighborhoods of Long Beach, California
