= South of Conant, Long Beach, California =

Neighborhood in Long Beach, California, US

Coordinates: 33.817388°N 118.126767°W

South of Conant
- Neighborhood of Long Beach
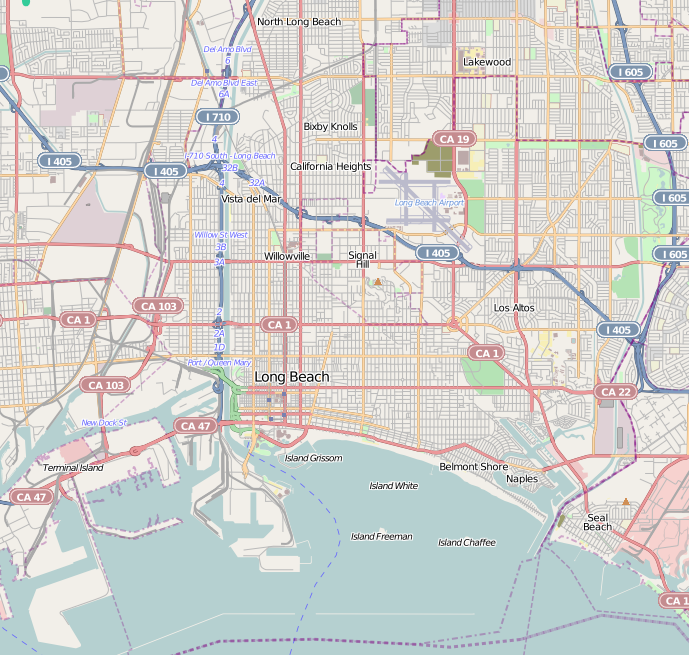
- Location within Long Beach, California Location within Los Angeles metropolitan area Location within California Location within the United States South of Conant (the United States)
- Country: United States
- State: California
- County: Los Angeles
- City: Long Beach

South of Conant is a neighborhood located in Long Beach, California that lies just north of Spring Street, south of Conant Street, east of Clark Avenue, and west of Woodruff Avenue; and includes Wardlow Park. It is known for its LGBTQ+ community.
