= El Dorado Regional Park, Long Beach, California =

Park in Long Beach, CA

El Dorado Regional Park
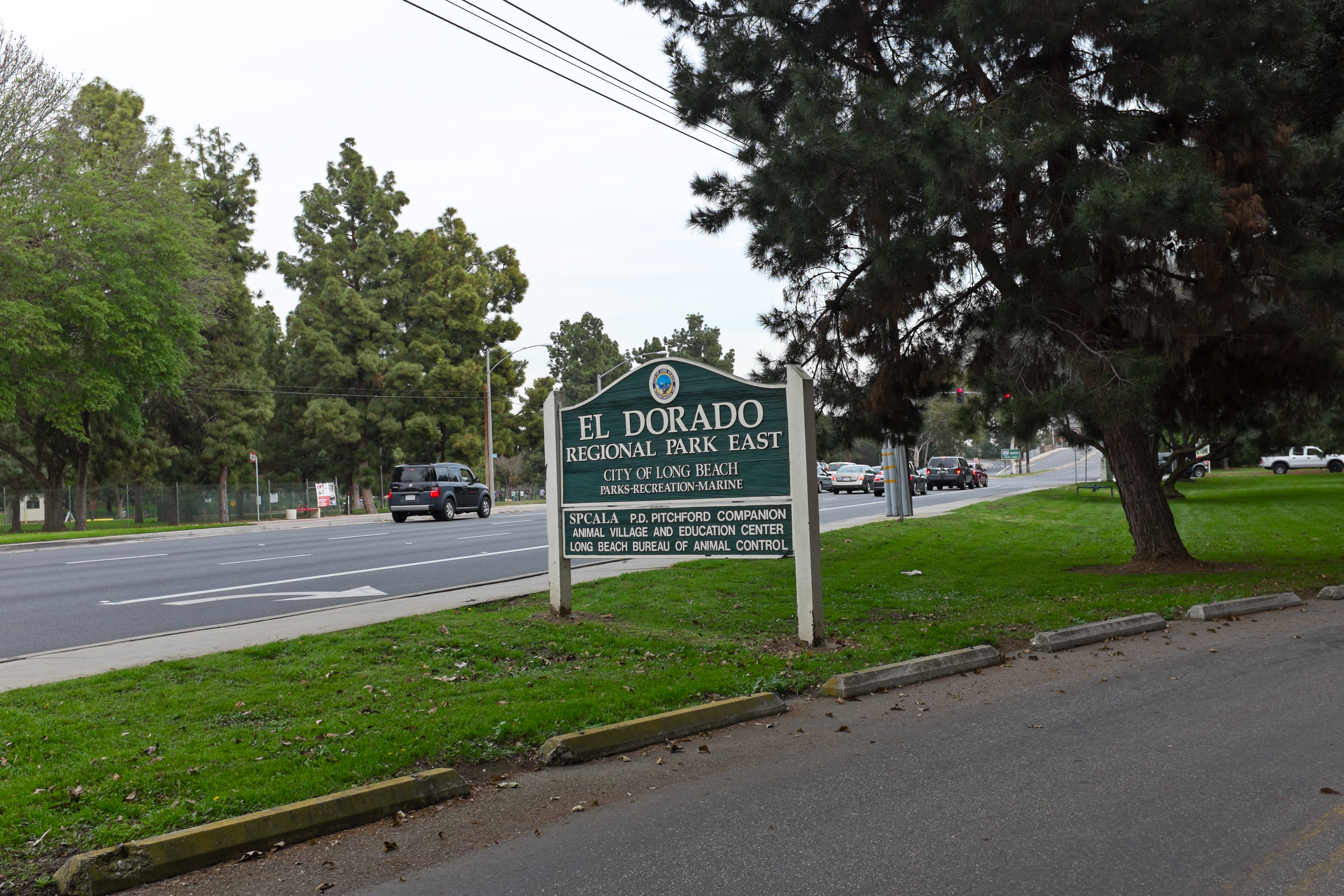

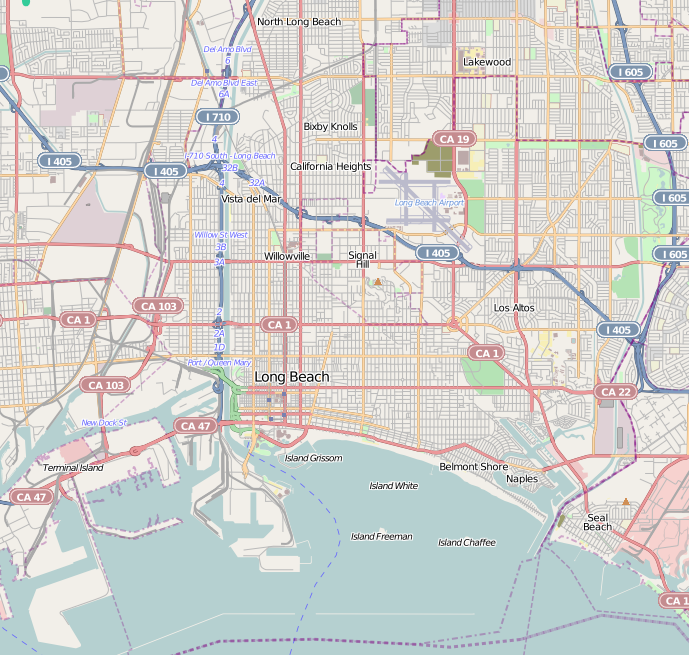
- Location within Long Beach, California
- Type: Regional Park
- Location: Long Beach, CA
- Coordinates: 33.810°N 118.087°W
- Area: 641.9 acres (1.0030 sq mi)
- Opened: 1964
- Owner: City of Long Beach
- Website: longbeach.gov/park/park-and-facilities/directory/el-dorado-east-regional-park/

El Dorado Regional Park is a park in Long Beach, California, United States. It is on the east side of the city.

The park is subdivided into Area I, Area II, and Area III. Area I, or El Dorado Park West, is bounded on the east by the San Gabriel River, on the north by Spring Street, and on the west by Studebaker Road. Area II is north of Spring Street, west of the 605 freeway, east of the river, and south of Wardlow Road. Area Ill is north of Wardlow Road, west of the 605 freeway, east of the river, and north of Wardlow Road. Areas II and III together compose El Dorado East Regional Park.

The park sits in a flood zone, and it protects residences from spillover from the neighboring San Gabriel River.

With a median household income of $130,959, the El Dorado Park area is reportedly the wealthiest in Long Beach.

== History ==
The land for the park was sold to the City of Long Beach by members of the Bixby family and was financed using bond money floated in the 1950s and '60s, and the varied topography comes from soil removed to construct the San Gabriel Freeway. Recreation Commission member Milton B. Arthur is credited with ensuring that the site was acquired by the City for a park before it was developed into homes.

The Long Beach Parks, Recreation and Marine Department administration offices moved to the site of El Dorado Park West in 1962, beginning in a renovated home on the property after the City purchased the land. Most of Area I opened to the public in 1964, including a golf course. A branch of Long Beach's public library opened in 1970. Area II opened to the public on February 6, 1971; Area III opened in July 1974.

=== 1984 Summer Olympics ===
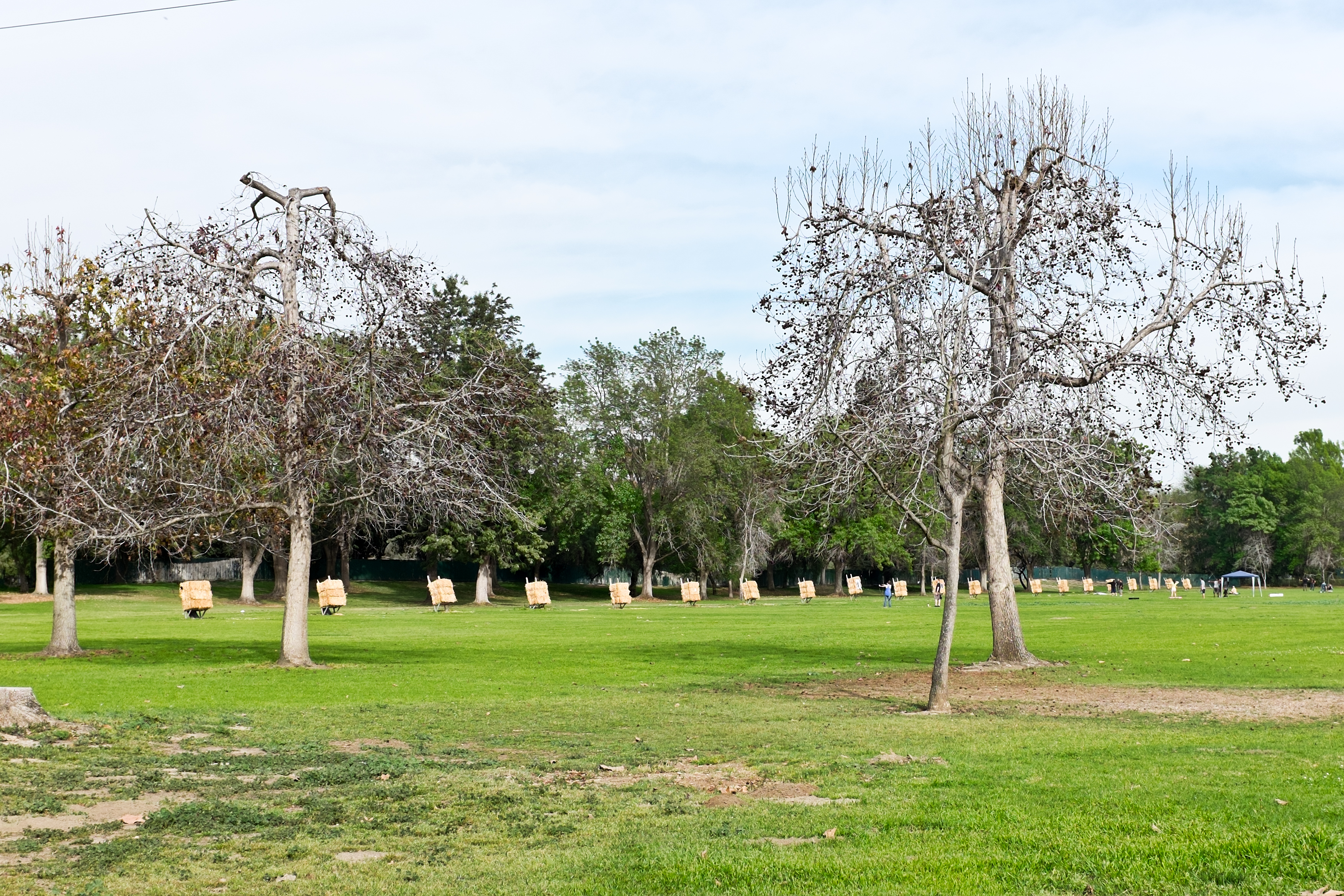
The archery range

During the 1984 Summer Olympics in neighboring Los Angeles, the park was the site for the archery competitions. A temporary venue was set up as a result.

=== Former Naval Hospital ===
70 acres at the north end of the park was sold by the City of Long Beach to the Navy for $1 in 1965 to build a new naval hospital, replacing its World War II-era facilities located on Pacific Coast Highway on the facilities later used by the (closed) Brooks College and now as student housing at Cal State Long Beach. It became known for its alcoholism treatment program which launched in 1967 and became known as the hub of the military's dependency program. Perhaps its most famous patient was Betty Ford, who was admitted for drug and alcohol dependence in 1978. Another famous patient was Nazi war criminal Andrija Artukovic. This hospital closed in 1994 along with the closing of the Long Beach Naval Shipyard and Naval Station and disbanding of the Long Beach Naval Fleet. Rather than returning the land to park use, the city proposed a shopping mall. After years of legal battles by neighboring cities, who were concerned with the loss of sales tax revenue as well as competition with their own shopping malls, the center opened in 2000.

== Amenities ==
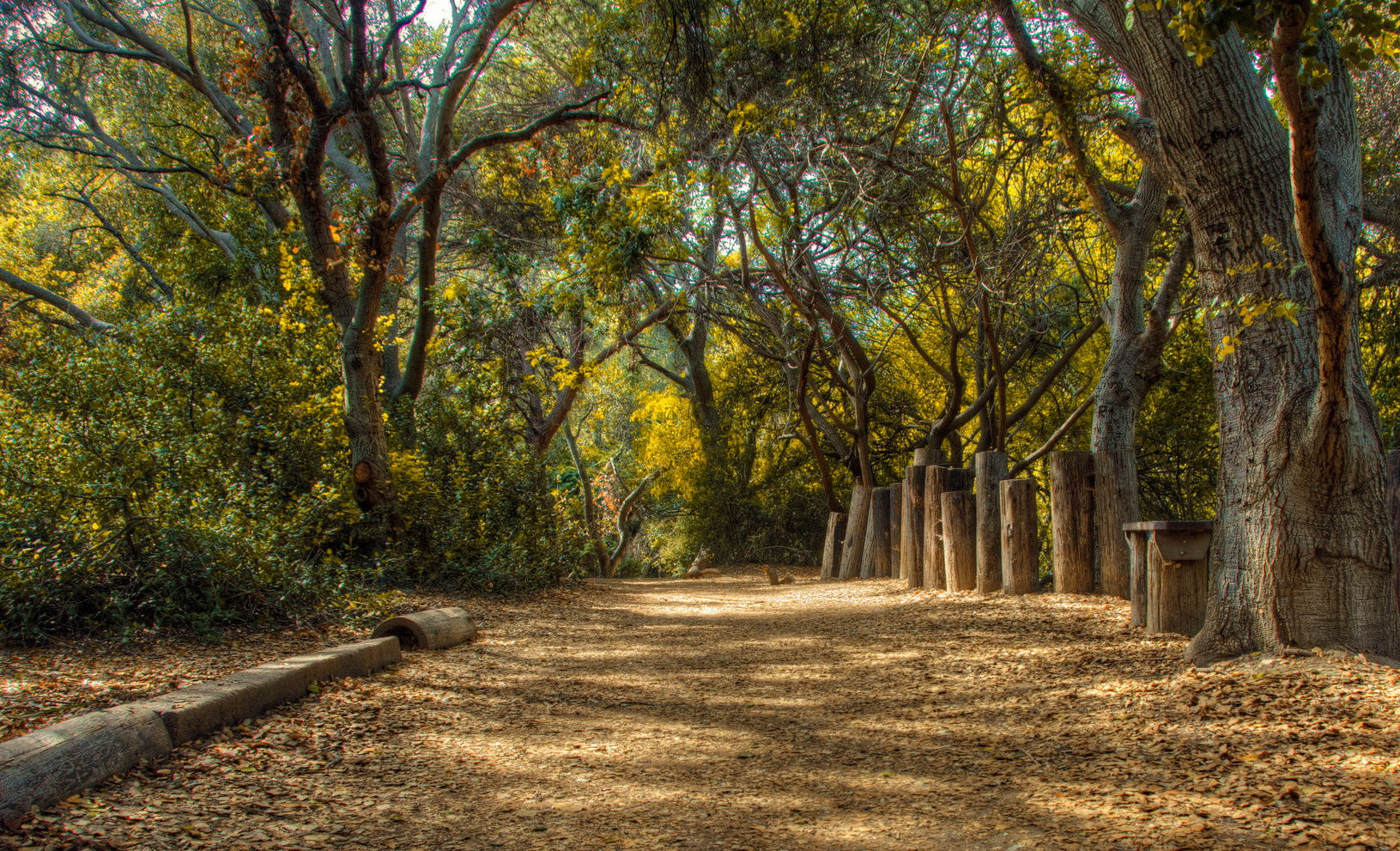
Walking trail in the El Dorado Nature Center

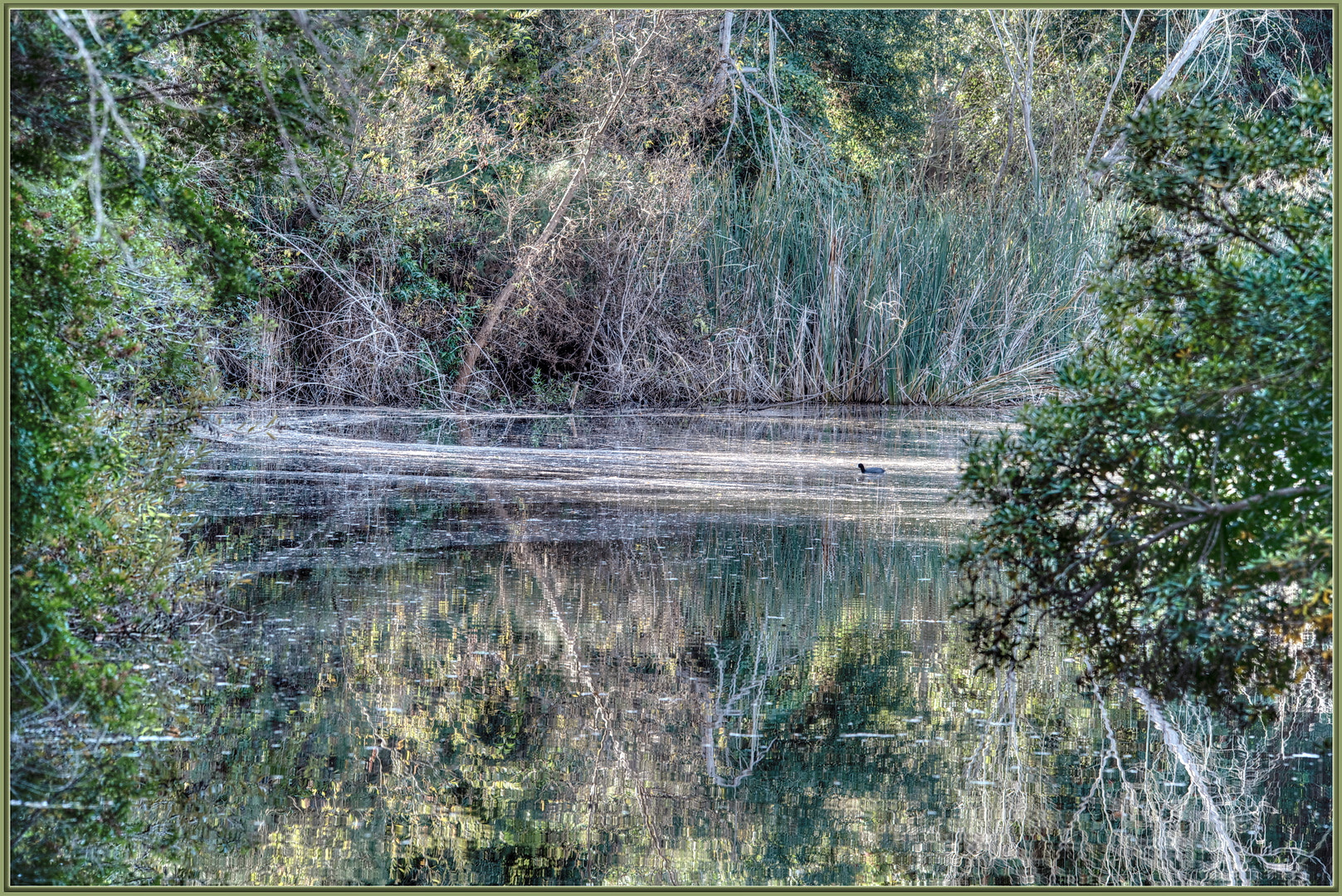
Pond in the Nature Center

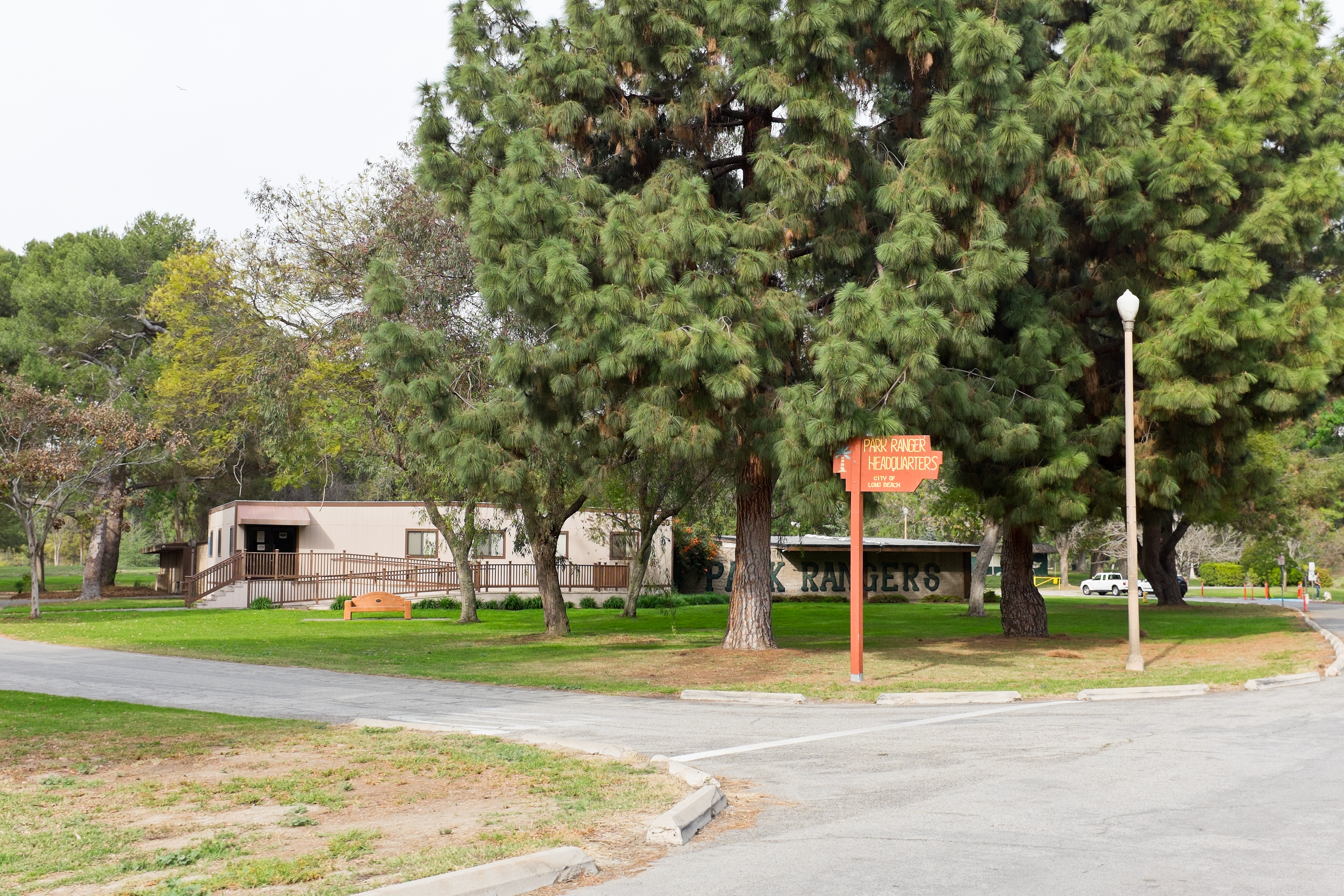
Park Headquarters

=== El Dorado Park West ===
Area I includes six baseball diamonds, several picnic areas, two playgrounds, a 15-court tennis center, two basketball courts, a skateboard park, a duck pond, a disc golf course, soccer fields, and a community center.

=== El Dorado East Regional Park ===
Area II includes lakes, paddle boats, an archery range, group picnic areas, overnight camping facilities, and bicycle and walking trails. Area III contains lakes, group picnic areas, a fire station, and trails. Area III is also the location of Glider Hill, which sits in an area originally intended to become an amphitheater and is popular with model airplane enthusiasts.

El Dorado East also contains the El Dorado Nature Center and El Dorado Frontier, a small theme park that features a train. Fishing and a physical fitness course are also available.

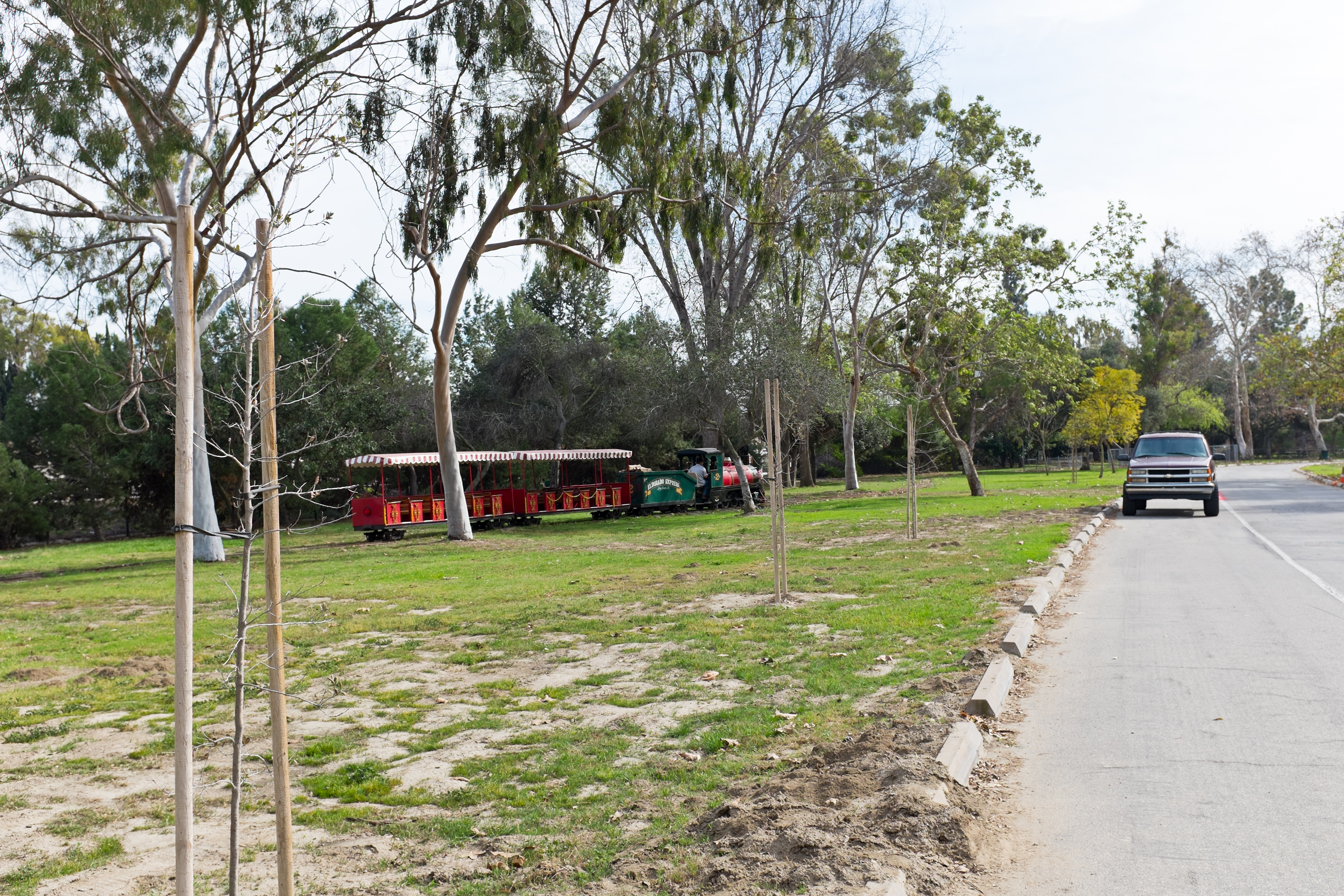
Train ride for Kids, the El Dorado Express

=== Bicycle paths ===
A 4-mile bikeway runs through the park and connects with the San Gabriel River Bike Trail at various locations. Both the Coyote Creek Bicycle Path and the San Gabriel River Bicycle Path cross the El Dorado Park Estates neighborhood.

== Adjacent Neighborhoods ==
- El Dorado Park South
- El Dorado Park Estates
- Rancho Estates

== Nearby Facilities ==
The Long Beach Police Department maintains a police academy on the northern end of the park, complete with a pistol range.

Camp Fire operates a 7-acre developed camping facility including a challenge course featuring rock walls, and high and low ropes course at the north end of the park between the San Gabriel River, the Long Beach Towne Center, and Heartwell Golf Course, leasing land owned by the City of Long Beach as part of Heartwell Park. Prior to the construction of the shopping center, this maintained an unbroken contiguity of open land between Heartwell Park and El Dorado Park.

Long Beach Animal Care Services is adjacent to El Dorado Park East Regional Park.

== See also ==
- Neighborhoods of Long Beach, California
