= East Village, Long Beach, California =

East Village East Village Arts District
- Neighborhood of Long Beach
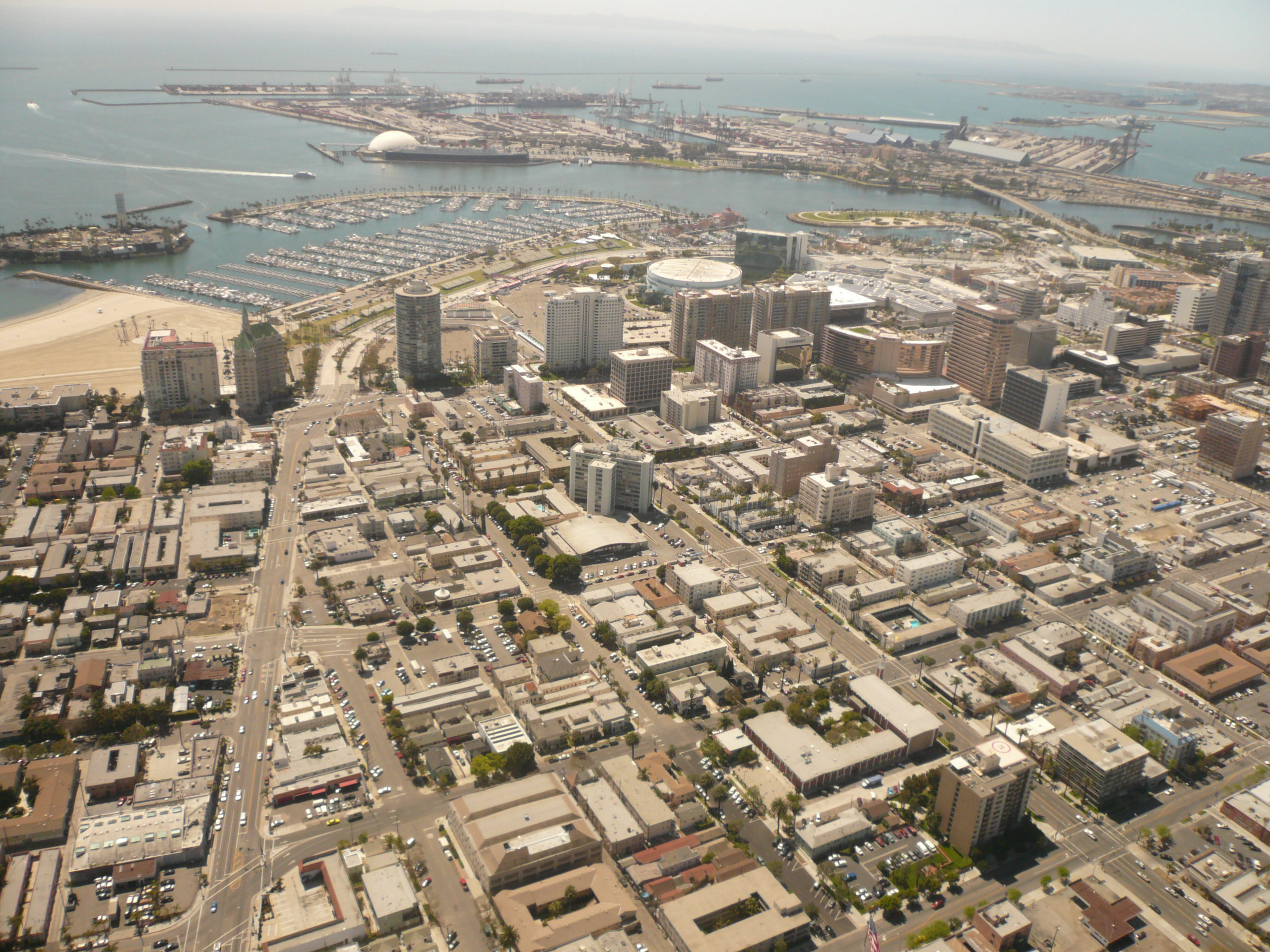
- The East Village district of Long Beach, California, is in the right three-quarters of the foreground of this southwest-facing photo (the Alamitos Beach neighborhood makes up the left quarter of the foreground, on the east side of Alamitos Avenue, the diagonal street on the left). Downtown Long Beach is to the right. Queensway Bay/San Pedro Bay are visible, with the Queen Mary and part of the Port of Long Beach in the distance. Catalina Island is faintly visible on the horizon.

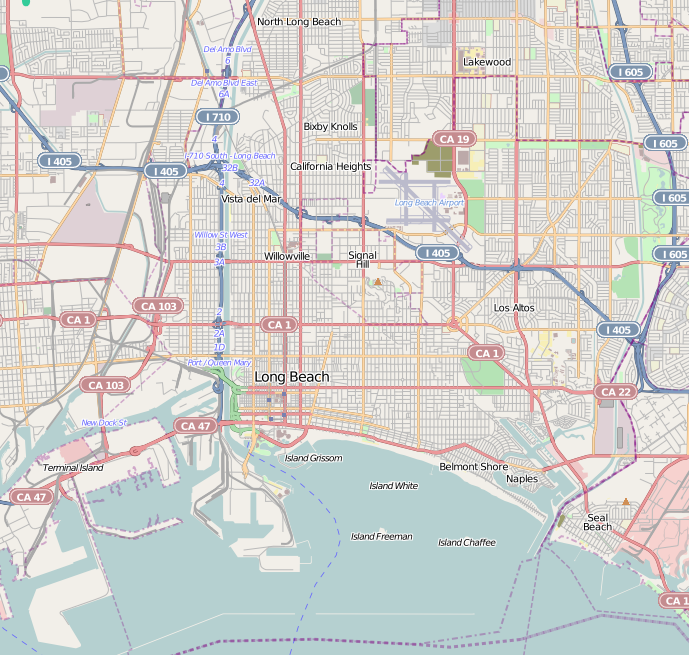
- Location within Long Beach, California Location within the Los Angeles metropolitan area Location within southern California Location within California Location within the United States
- Country: United States
- State: California
- County: Los Angeles
- City: Long Beach

The East Village, sometimes called the "East Village Arts District," is the name of a neighborhood in Long Beach, California, within eastern Downtown Long Beach. The borders of the East Village are not strictly defined, but the area is centered in the southeast portion of downtown, roughly between Long Beach Boulevard on the west and Alamitos Avenue on the east, and Ocean Boulevard on the south to 10th Street on the north.

The East Village is a mix of many different housing types, including high-rise condos, artist lofts and small craftsman cottages. It serves as the home to individuals with differing cultures, income levels, and professions.

The neighborhood has many independent stores selling everything from designer denim and specialty sneakers to used books and mid-century furniture. There are coffee shops, juice bars, and restaurants featuring selections from crepes and sushi to chicken n' waffles.

The East Village is also the city's arts district, with most of the independent shops, restaurants and galleries exhibiting work by Long Beach and Southern Californian artists.

== Appearances in popular culture ==
- SoundWalk was featured in Visiting... with Huell Howser Episode 1612

== Gallery ==
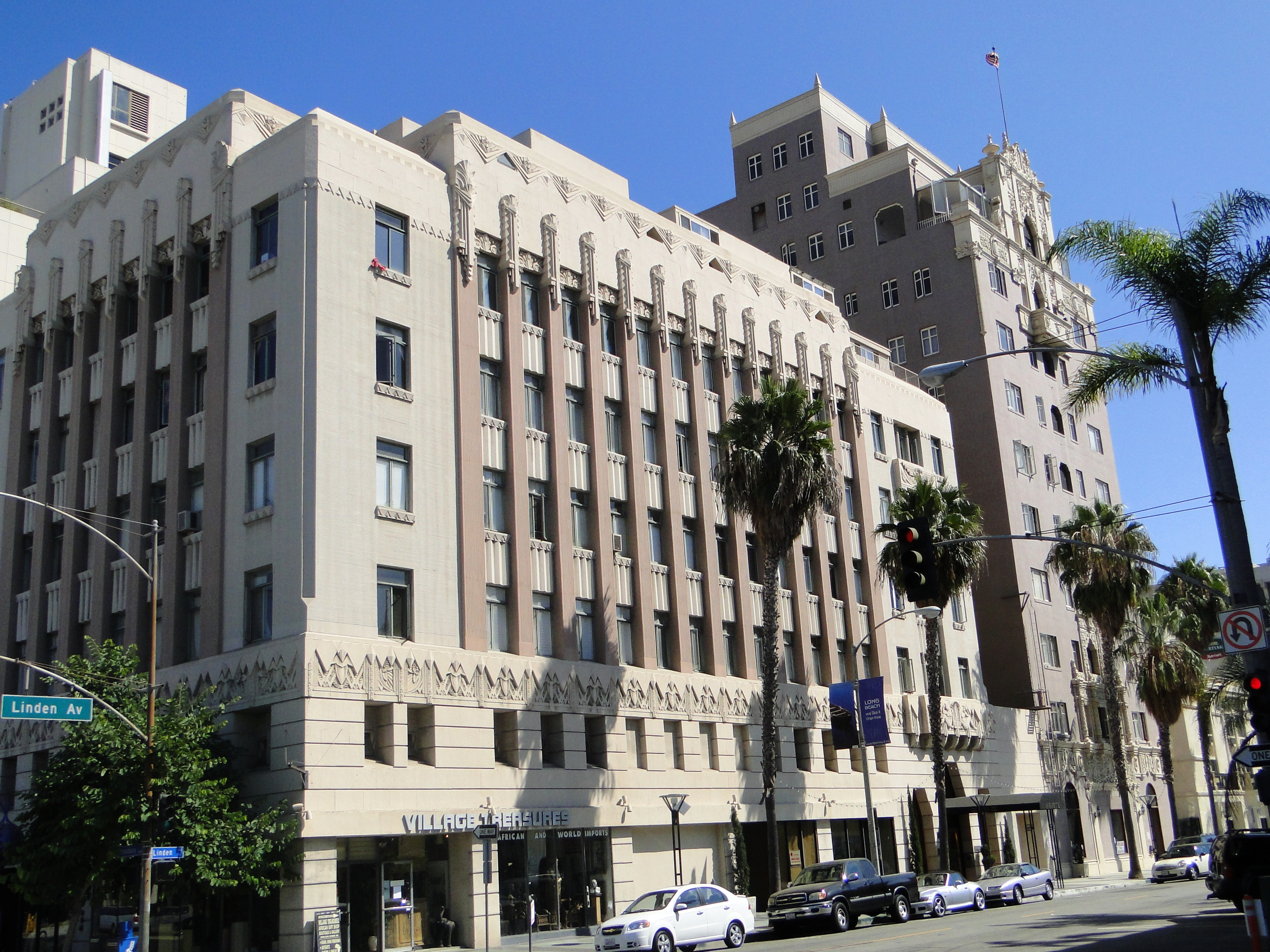
The Lafayette Condominiums complex, originally the Lafayette Hotel and Campbell Apartments buildings

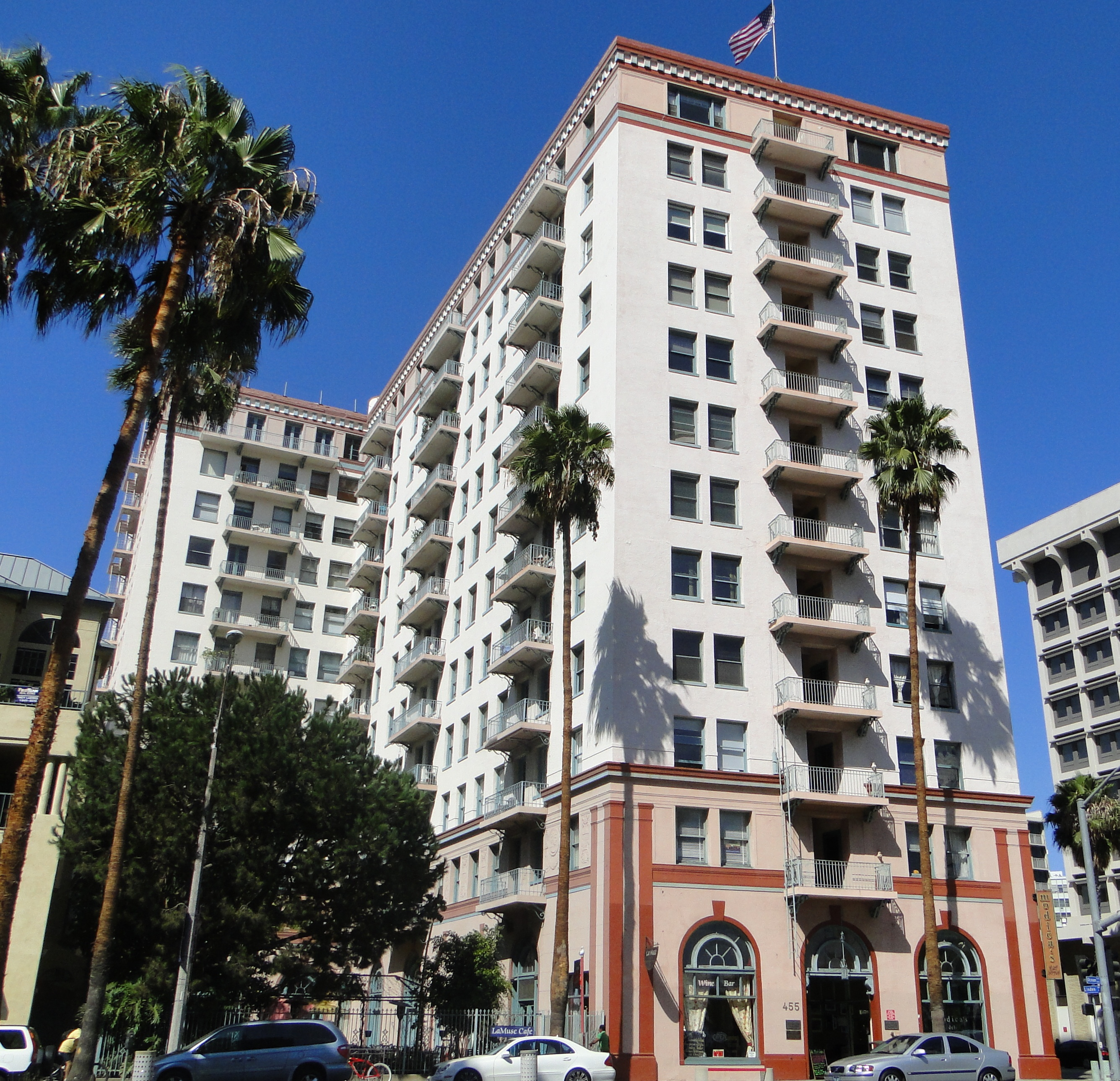
Cooper Arms Apartments

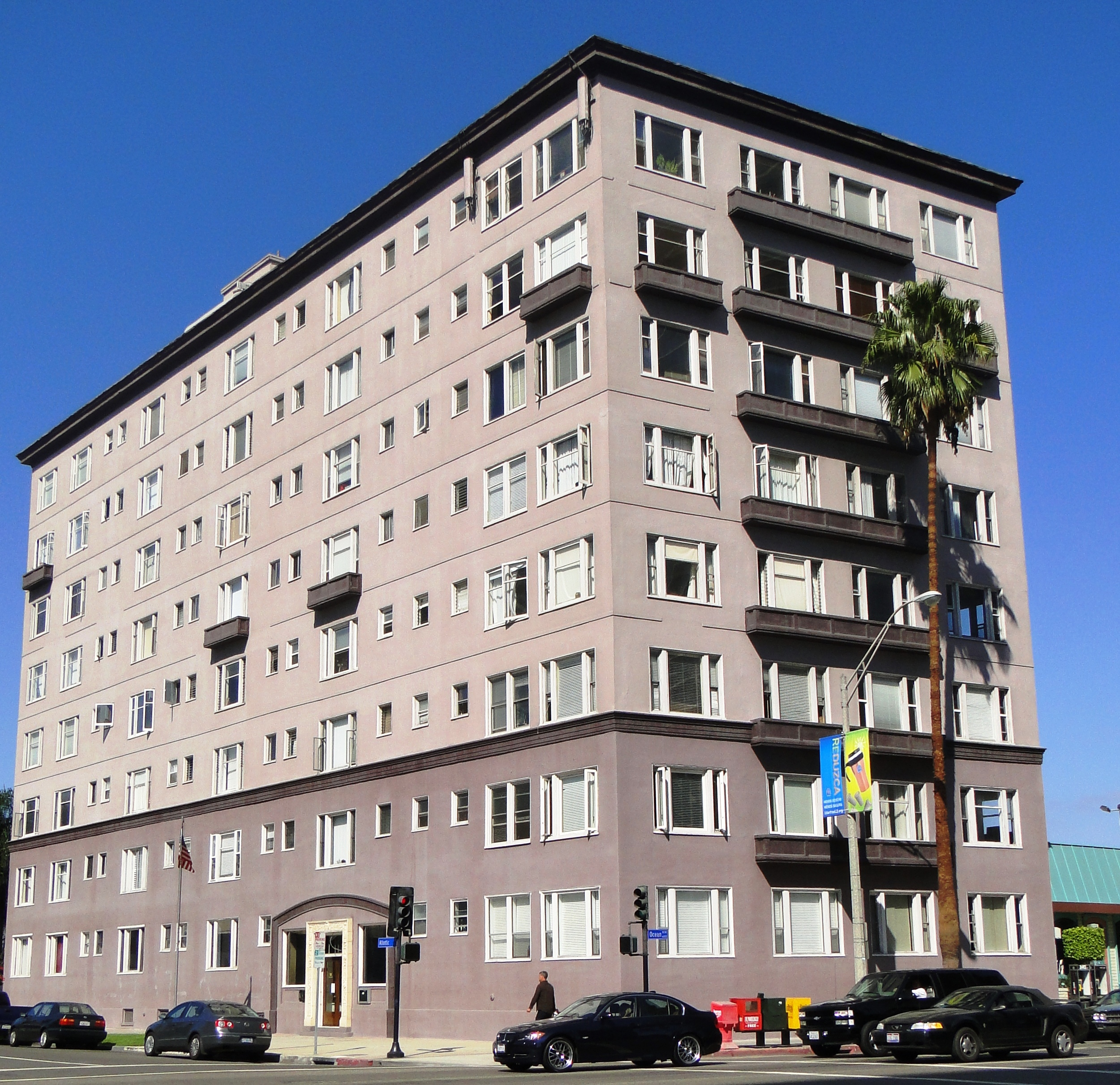
Artaban Apartments

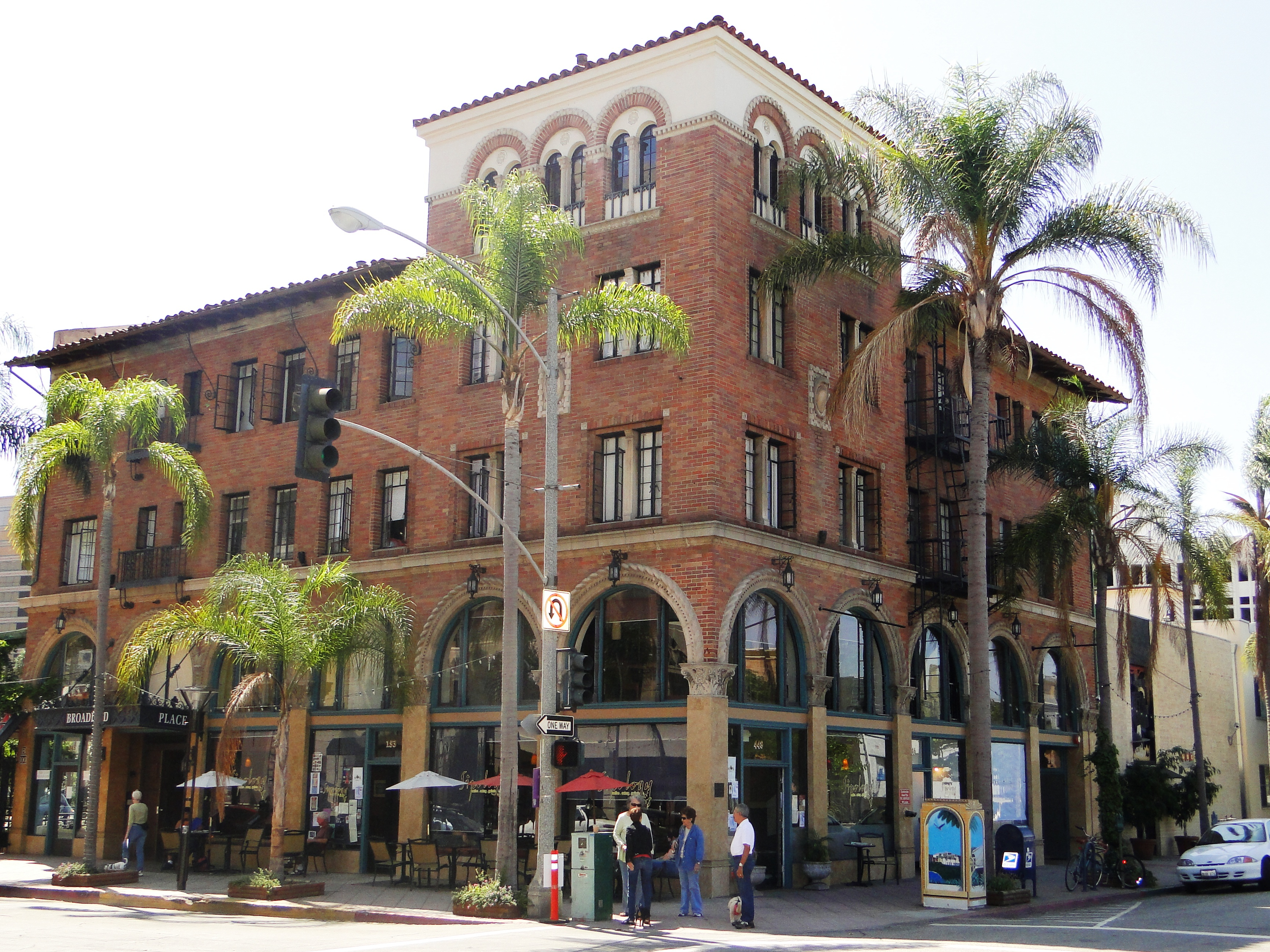
The Broadlind Hotel, built in 1928

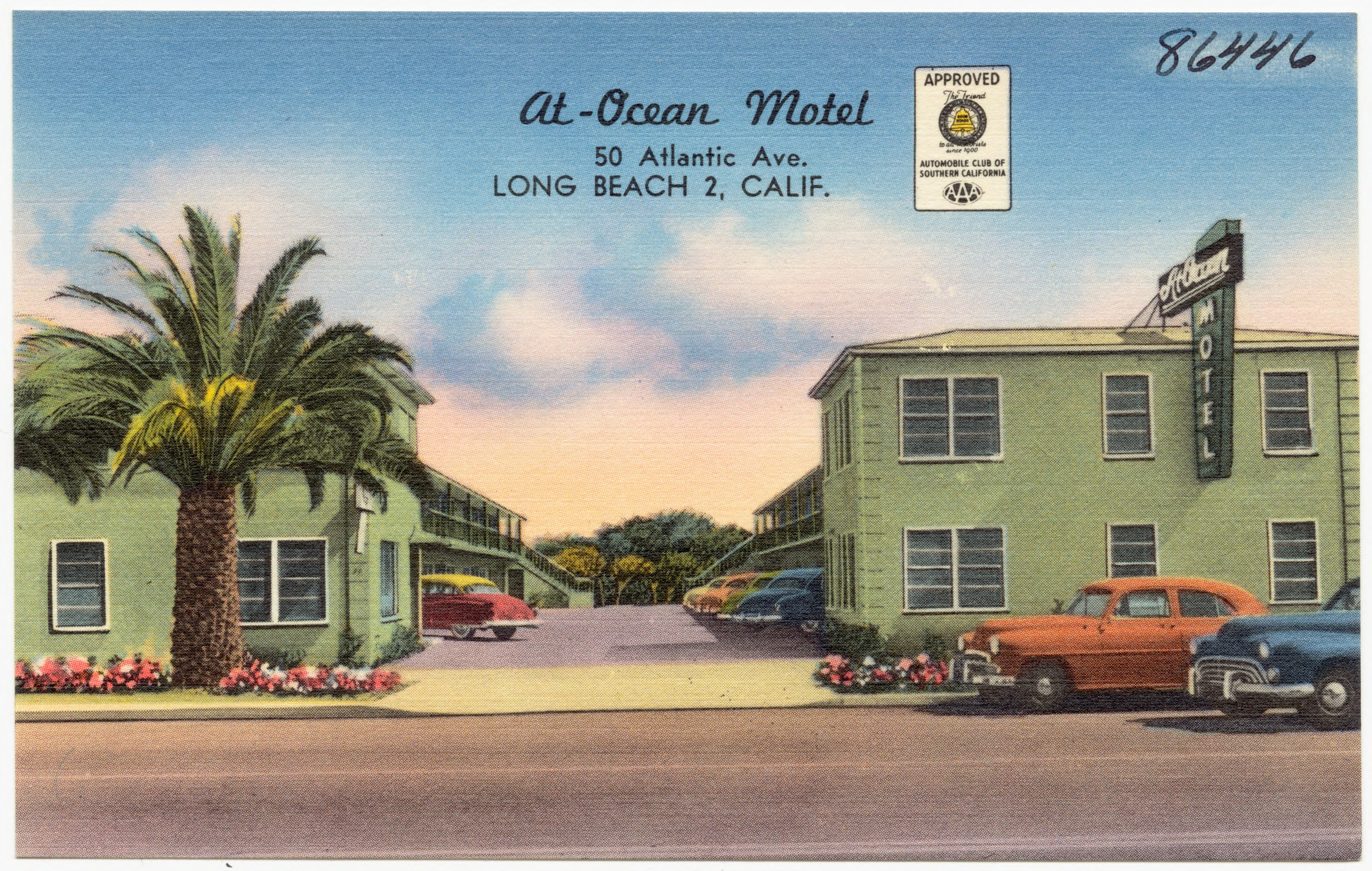
Postcard depicting the At-Ocean Motel, 50 Atlantic Ave., circa 1930 to 1945

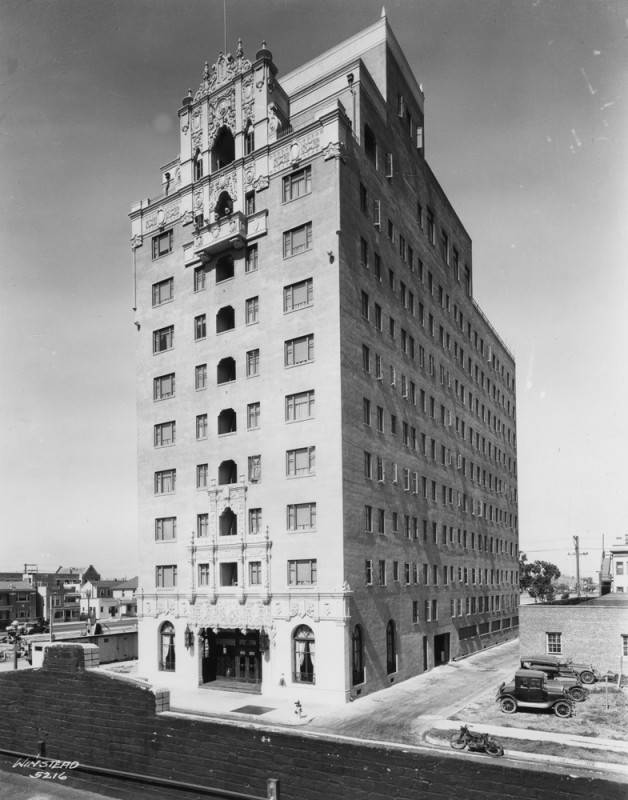
Campbell Apartments, 1928

== See also ==
- Broadway Corridor, Long Beach, California
- Neighborhoods of Long Beach, California
