= Wrigley, Long Beach =

Coordinates: 33.805599°N 118.197423°W

Wrigley, California
- Neighborhood of Long Beach
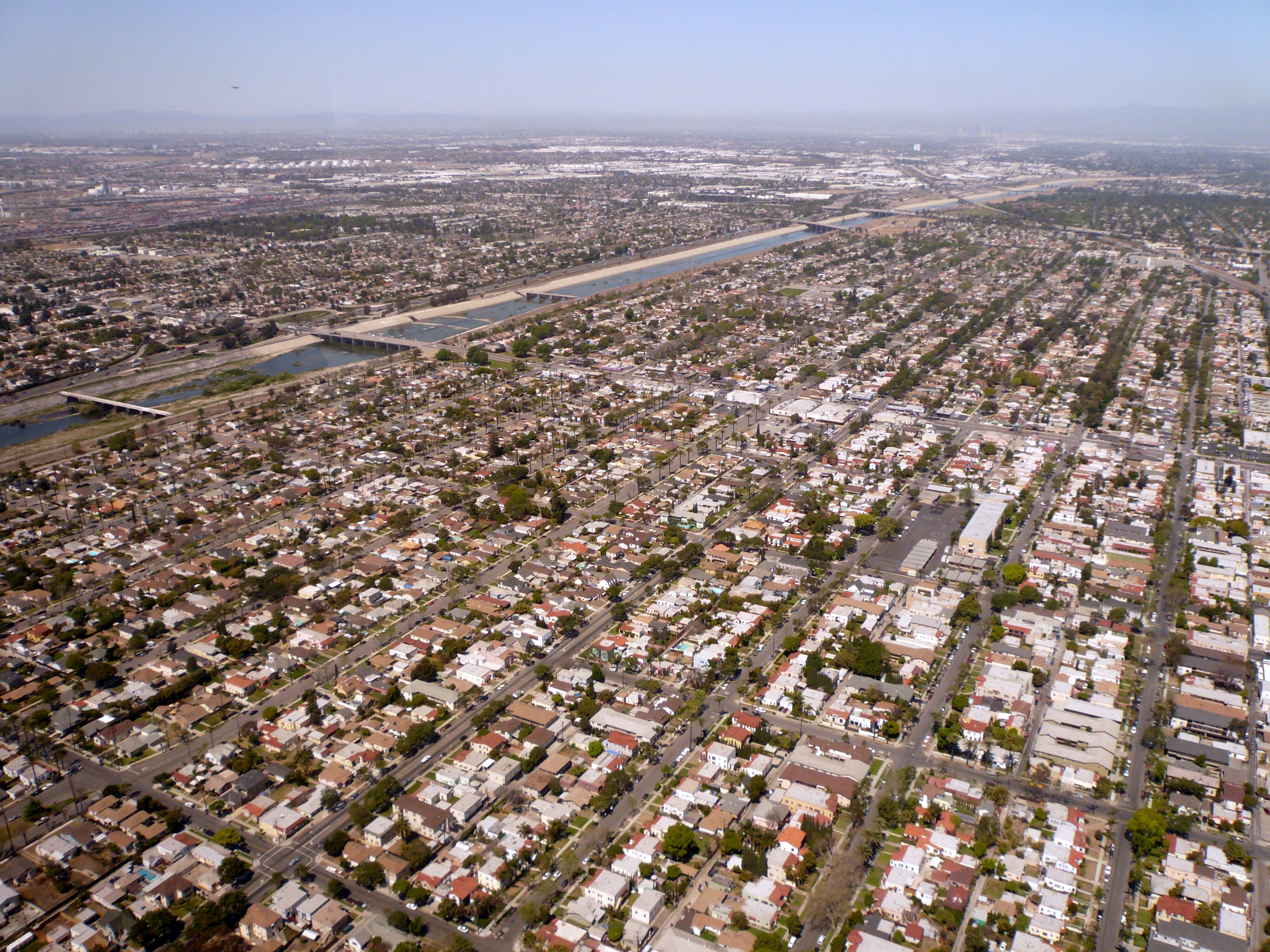
- The Wrigley neighborhood of Long Beach, California. Willow Street runs from the right side of the photo, through the center of the neighborhood, to the bridge crossing the Los Angeles River on the left.
- Interactive map of Wrigley, California
- Country: United States
- State: California
- County: Los Angeles
- City: Long Beach
- Website: https://wrigleylb.com/

Wrigley is a group of neighborhoods in Long Beach, California, United States. It includes the neighborhoods North Wrigley, South Wrigley, Southeast Wrigley and Wrigley Heights.

The neighborhood has a community park, Veterans Park, convenient access to local freeways, A Line light rail transportation and the new Wrigley Marketplace shopping district - an innovative joint venture between Long Beach and the Metropolitan Transportation Authority. The center combines neighborhood-serving retail with a modern park and ride facility for light rail commuters.

== History ==
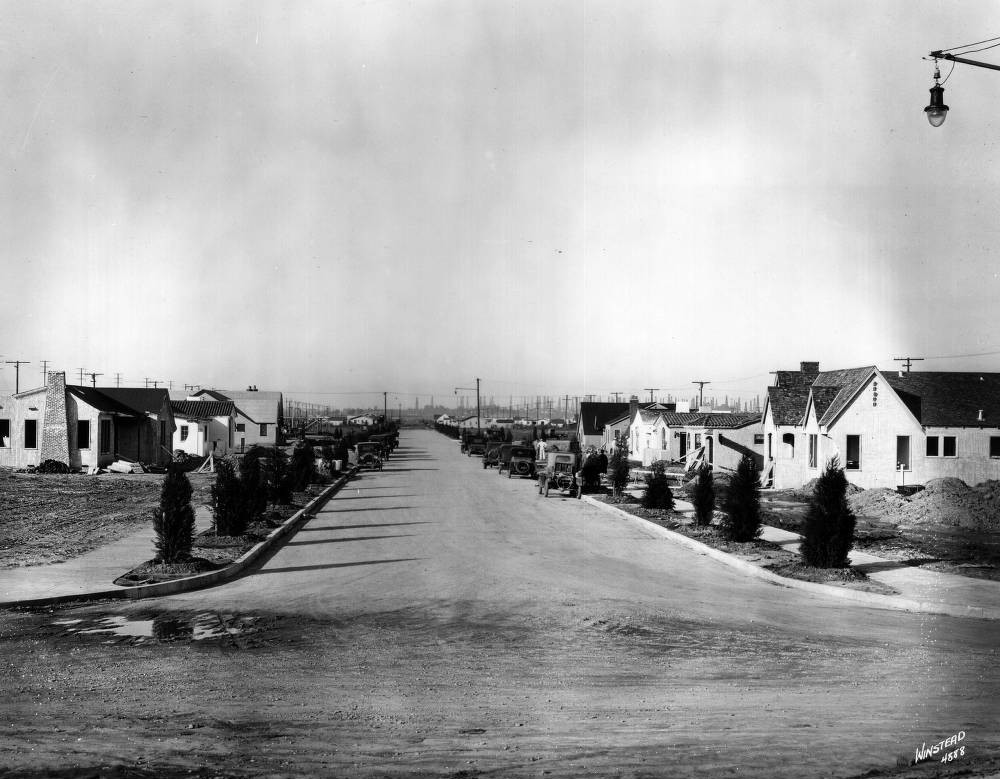
Construction at 20th St. and Eucalyptus Ave. in Wrigley District, c. 1928

The original subdivision pattern was established in 1905. Homes on 48 lots were developed by William Wrigley Jr.'s company between 1928 and 1934. These blocks of homes now form the Wrigley Landmark District.

In 1914, Gregorio Encinas purchased six and one-half acres of land from the Bixby family to establish the Encinas family ranch. The ranch house at 625 Baker Street was demolished in 1960 during the development of Interstate 405. The Baker Street Park was established in 2011 at the address of the former ranch house.

Homes in Wrigley Heights were developed by Lloyd Whaley.

A Pacific Electric track once ran along what is now the Daisy Avenue Greenbelt.

== Architecture ==
Wrigley has a designated historic district.

== See also ==
- Neighborhoods of Long Beach, California
