= Broadway Corridor, Long Beach, California =

Gay and lesbian business district

Coordinates: 33.7645°N 118.1542°W

The Broadway business corridor in Long Beach, California is loosely defined as a three-mile stretch of East Broadway between Downtown Long Beach and Belmont Shore. It includes the area around Bixby Park sometimes referred to as a "gayborhood" because of the concentration of gay-owned and/or gay-friendly businesses. The Gay and Lesbian Center of Greater Long Beach is located on nearby 4th Street.

Broadway is also the location of several restaurants, specialty stores, bars and coffee houses.

Long Beach has one of the largest gay and lesbian populations in the country. The city's Gay Pride Parade, which goes down nearby Ocean Blvd., is the second largest in the United States, and is the second largest event in Long Beach after the Long Beach Grand Prix.
