= Downtown Long Beach =

- Neighborhood
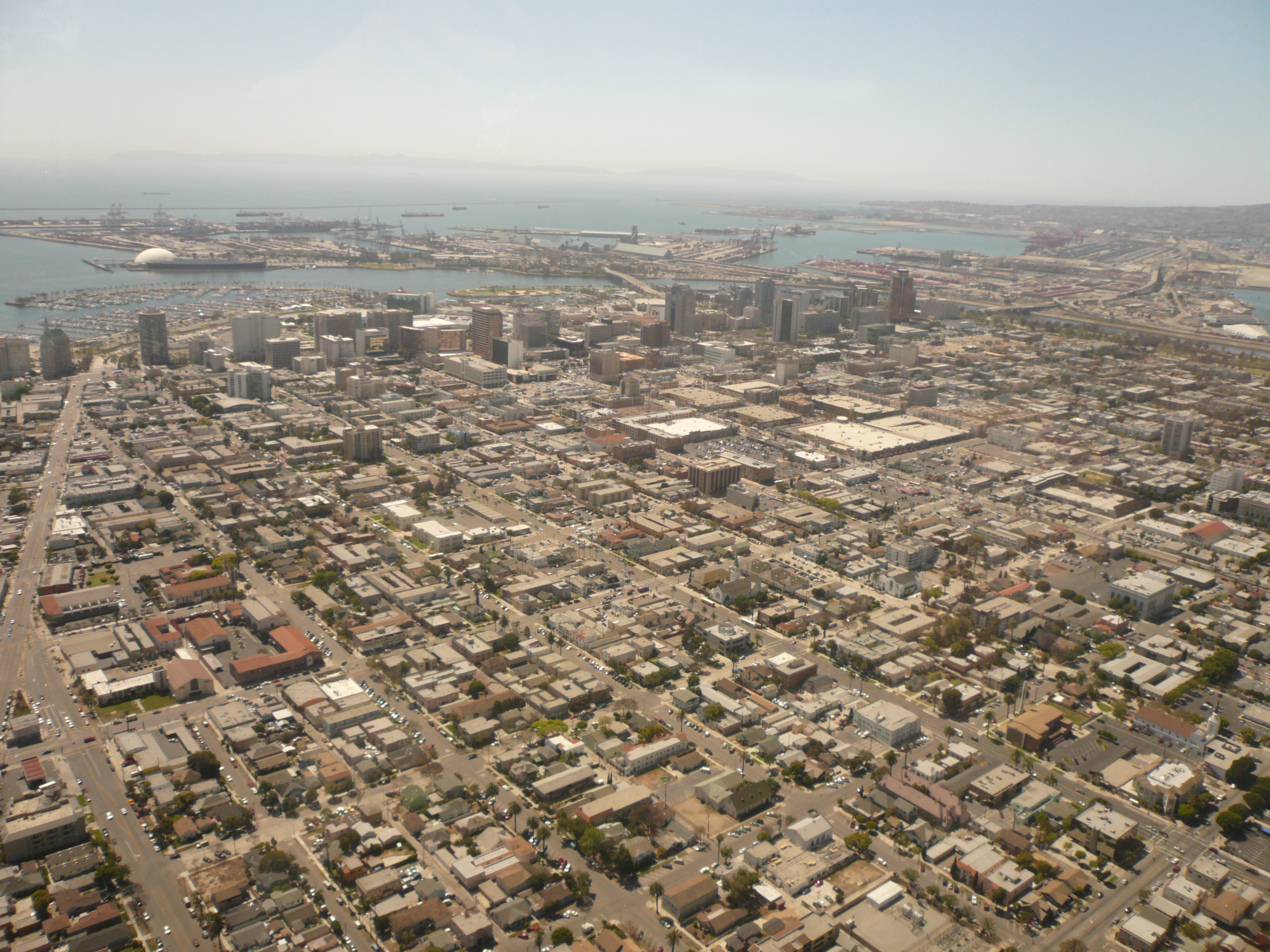
- Aerial view of downtown Long Beach, California, looking southwest. San Pedro Bay and the Port of Long Beach are visible beyond, with Catalina Island faintly visible on the horizon.

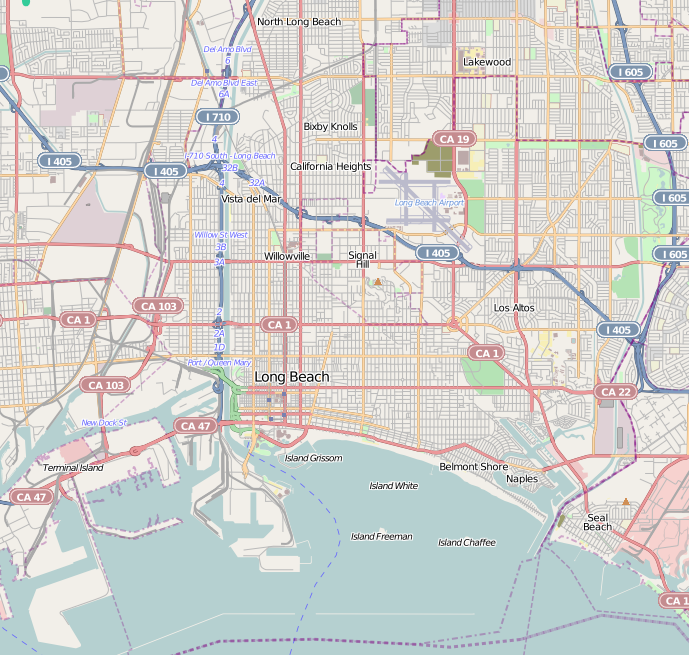
- Location within Long Beach, California Location within the Los Angeles metropolitan area Location within southern California Location within California Location within the United States
- Country: United States
- State: California
- County: Los Angeles
- City: Long Beach

Downtown Long Beach, California, United States is the location for most of the city's major tourist attractions, municipal services and for numerous businesses. There are many hotels and restaurants in the area that serve locals, tourists, and convention visitors.

== Location ==
Downtown Long Beach is bounded by the Los Angeles River to the west, and Ocean Boulevard to the south (south of Ocean is considered the "Downtown Shoreline", a separate area). Alamitos Avenue roughly delimits downtown to the east, although the city's actual downtown zoning extends a few blocks east of Alamitos. Similarly, downtown effectively ends around 7th Street to the north, but the city's downtown zoning carries as far north as Anaheim Street between Pacific Avenue and Long Beach Boulevard, and up to 10th Street east of that.

The greater downtown area includes the neighborhoods of the East Village Arts District, the West End, North Pine, the Civic Center, and the "Downtown Core" or central business and entertainment area.

== Tourist attractions and shopping ==
- Aquarium of the Pacific
- Catalina Express – boats to Catalina Island
- East Village Arts District
- Long Beach Convention and Entertainment Center
- Long Beach Shoreline Marina
- Terrace Theater
- Long Beach Sports Arena (which has one of Wyland's Whaling Walls)
- Long Beach Plaza – shopping
- Museum of Latin American Art
- The Pike – shopping
- Pine Avenue — restaurants and nightclubs
- Queen Mary – historic ship, hotel, restaurants & conventions (nearby)
- Rainbow Harbor – shopping and restaurants
- Shoreline Village – shopping and restaurants
- Harvey Milk Promenade Park

=== Events ===
- Second Saturday Art Walk (East Village)
- Third Fridays Twilight Walk (Historic Pine Avenue)
- Certified Organic Farmers Market (Fridays)
- Bob Marley Reggae Festival (February)
- Queen Mary Scottish Festival (February)
- Congressional Cup (sailing races, April)
- Long Beach Grand Prix & Formula DRIFT (April)
- Cajun & Zydeco Festival (May)
- Long Beach Pride Parade & Festival (May)
- Aloha Concert Jam (Hawaiian music, June)
- Anime Expo or AX (SPJA) (Promotion of Japanese Animation & Culture July 2 to July 6)
- Catalina Ski Race (July)

=== 2028 Summer Olympics ===
During the Los Angeles 2028 Summer Olympics, downtown Long Beach will host coastal rowing, shooting, artistic swimming, marathon swimming, water polo, sport climbing, handball, beach volleyball, sailing and canoe sprint.

== Government and infrastructure ==
=== Local government ===
- Long Beach City Hall
- Long Beach Police Dept. Headquarters
- Municipal Library

=== County, state, and federal representation ===
- Long Beach Main Post Office, located at 300 Long Beach Boulevard
- Los Angeles Superior Court Governor George Deukmejian Courthouse

== Businesses ==
The Downtown Long Beach Alliance manages the business- and commercial property-based improvement districts in Downtown Long Beach. There are approximately 1,500 businesses in Downtown Long Beach, including several law firms given the proximity of the Los Angeles County Courthouse, as well as over 150 restaurants, wine bars, performing arts venues, and the Long Beach Convention and Entertainment Center. A complete and frequently updated business directory is available online at Downtown Long Beach Alliance's website.

The California State University system headquarters are at 401 Golden Shore in Downtown Long Beach.

- Long Beach Rescue Mission
- Long Beach World Trade Center
- Port of Long Beach (nearby)
- Molina Healthcare

== Revitalization Projects ==
Outdated office buildings that have reached the end of their competitive life-cycle are finding a new beginning as residential conversions. In 2014 the city's Municipal Code provided for Adaptive Reuse, which is a "construction or remodeling project that reconfigures existing spaces, structures or buildings to accommodate a new use or to accommodate another purpose than what it was originally designed for." The City created the Adaptive Reuse Incentive Program to guide developers through the process. Re-purposing a building avoids demolition, sending the structure to landfills, while preserving the historic value and unique architecture of downtown Long Beach. Examples of buildings converted for reuse include the Verizon office building on 200 W. Ocean Blvd. in Long Beach which is changed into a mixed-use apartment building over retail.

The Long Beach Professional Building, an eight-story poured in place concrete Art Deco medical office tower constructed in 1929 and once in danger of being torn down, was most recently renovated in 2018. The historic building is on the List of City of Long Beach Historic Landmarks and the California Office of Historic Preservation. The building was accepted in 2005 into the National Register of Historic Places. The restoration project was conducted by Global Premier Development and KTGY Architecture + Planning. The structure is now called The Regency Palms, an assisted living and memory care facility.

Refer to the Downtown Update of the Long Beach Development Services for a presentation document showing completed, approved and pending projects.

== Transportation ==
The following are located in Long Beach's downtown area:

- A transit center of Long Beach Transit (bus)
- The southern terminus of the Los Angeles Metro Rail A Line: Downtown Long Beach station
- The southern end of Interstate 710 (Long Beach Freeway)
- Bus service of Greyhound Lines, Amtrak Thruway, Torrance Transit, LADOT, and LACMTA

From 1902 to 1961, the neighborhood was served by the Pacific Electric Long Beach Line.

== Education ==
Downtown Long Beach is within the Long Beach Unified School District.

== Architecture ==
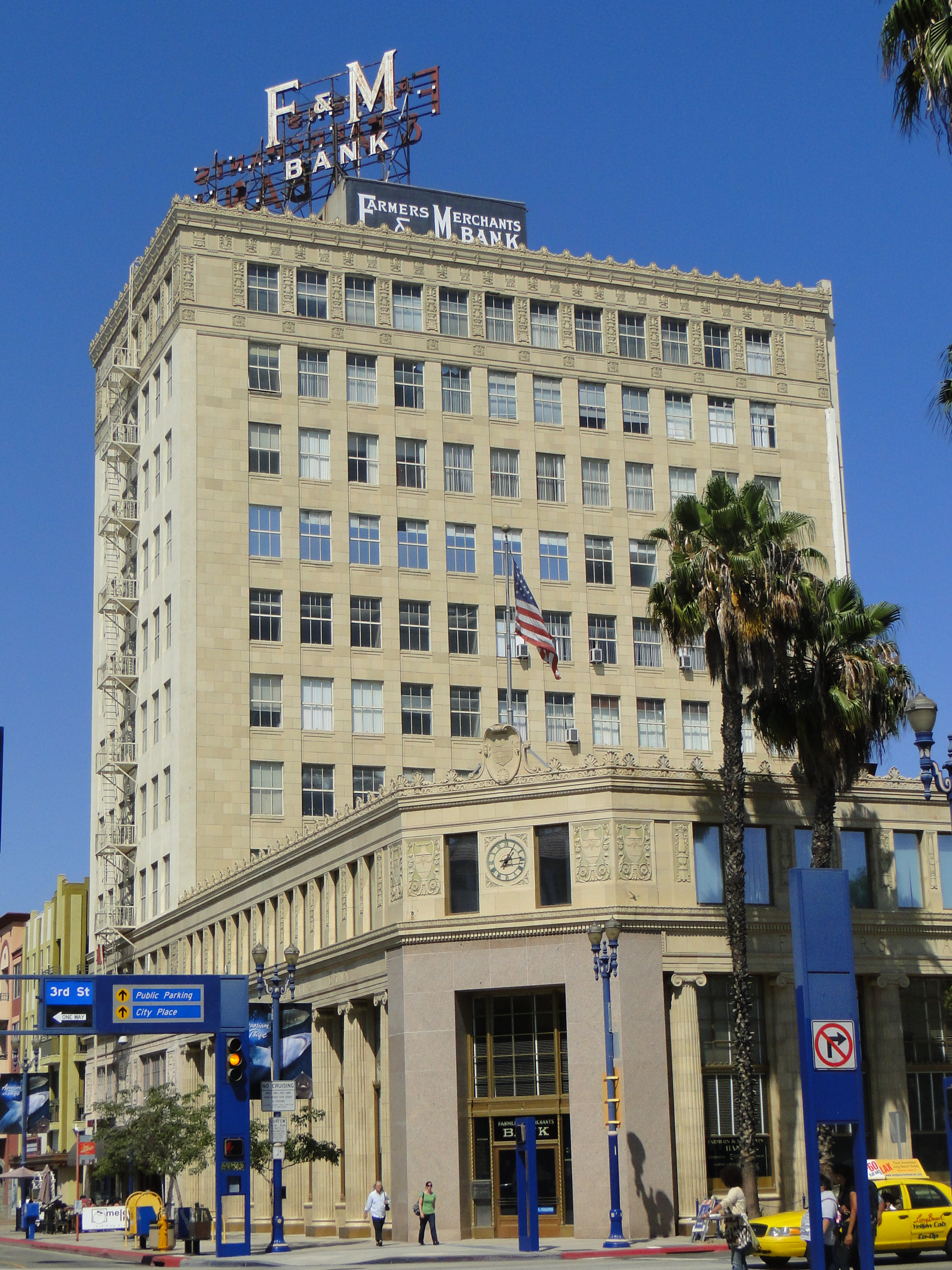
Farmers and Merchants Bank Office Tower, constructed 1922-1923

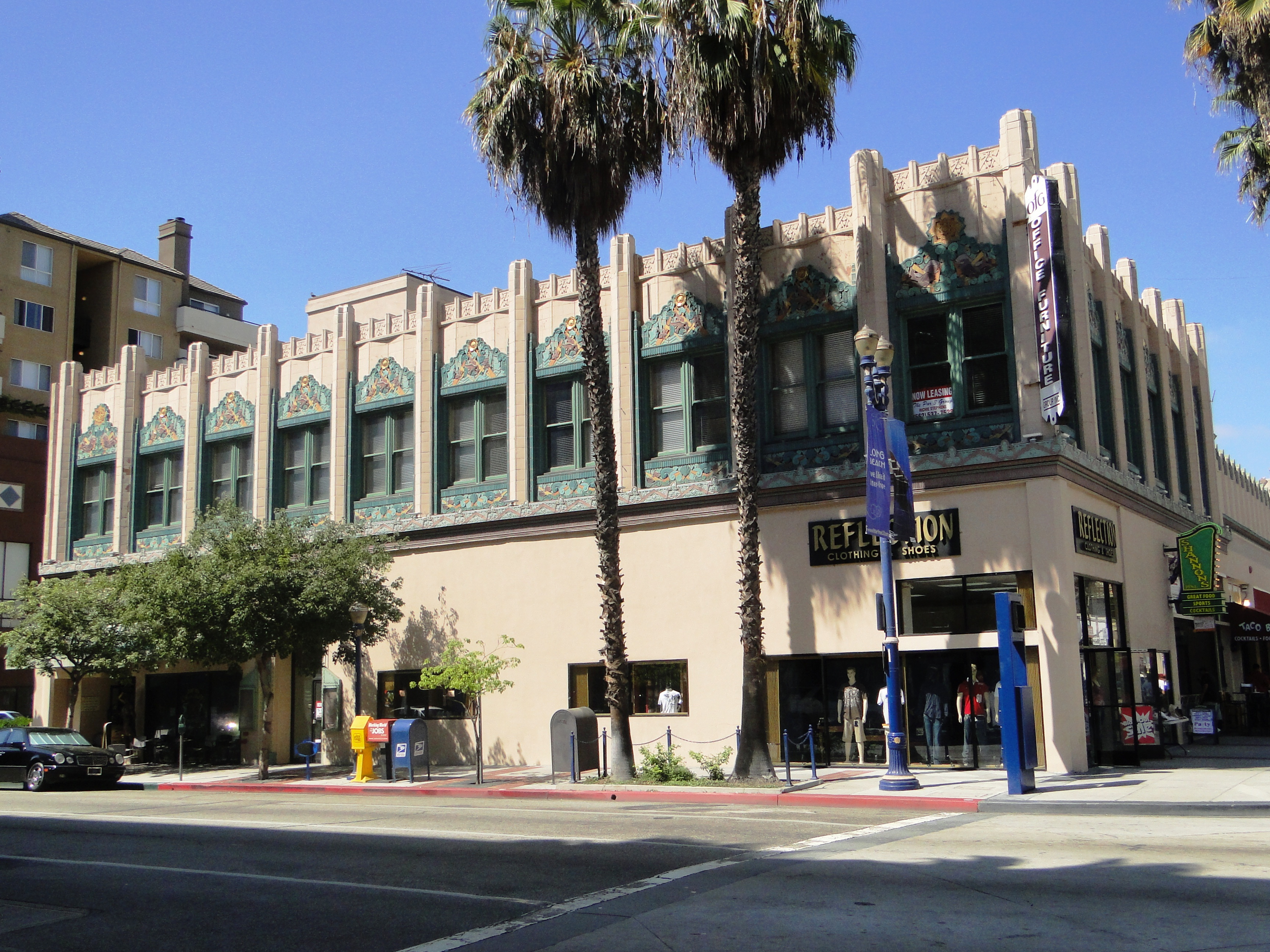
Dr. Rowan Building, constructed 1930

- Farmers and Merchants Bank Office Tower, Alexander Curlett, Claud Beelman, William Horace Austin
- International Tower (700 E. Ocean Blvd.)
- Ocean Club (1310 E. Ocean Blvd.)
- The Edison Building (100 Long Beach Blvd.)
- Adelaide M. Tichenor House (Greene and Greene) (852 E. Ocean Blvd.)
- Breakers Hotel (200-220 E. Ocean Blvd.)
- Walker's Department Store
- First National Bank of Long Beach
- Insurance Exchange Building (205 E. Broadway)
- Masonic Temple (Long Beach, California) (230 Pine Ave.)
- Ocean Center Building (110 W. Ocean Blvd.)
- Scottish Rite Cathedral
- Sovereign Apartment Building (360 W. Ocean)
- The Willmore (315 West Third Street)
- Villa Riviera (800 E. Ocean Blvd.)

== See also ==
- East Village, Long Beach, California
- Willmore, Long Beach, California
- Long Beach Shoreline Marina
- Neighborhoods of Long Beach, California
