= List of City of Long Beach historic landmarks =

This is a list of Long Beach historic landmarks. These sites have been designated as historic landmarks in the Long Beach Municipal Code. The city of Long Beach has recognized certain buildings and neighborhoods as having special architectural and historical value. The City Council designates historic landmarks and districts by city ordinance. In total, there are 114 Long Beach historic landmarks.

== Listing of the Long Beach historic landmarks ==
LBHL #	Name	Image	Address	Neighborhood	Description
16.52.010	Jergins Trust Building	Upload image	Pine Avenue and Ocean Boulevard		Demolished in 1989; formerly a landmark containing a theater, offices, and the Superior Court.
16.52.010	Pacific Coast Club	Upload image	850 East Ocean Blvd.		Demolished in 1989; formerly a private club, designed by Curlett and Beelman in the Chateauesque style, with interior decorations by Heinsbergen.
16.52.010	Villa Riviera		800 E. Ocean Blvd. 33°45′59″N 118°10′54″W		15-story apartment building later converted to condominiums; it was the second tallest building in Southern California when built in 1929.
16.52.010	First Congregational Church		241 Cedar Ave. 33°46′12″N 118°11′43″W		Red brick church built in 1914 in Italian Romanesque Revival style with Gothic rose windows; founded by Jotham and Margaret Bixby.
16.52.010	Rancho Los Alamitos		6400 Bixby Hill Rd. 33°46′38″N 118°6′19″W		Adobe house built c. 1806 is one of the oldest in Southern California, also listed on the National Register of Historic Places as the site of the former Puvunga Village.
16.52.010	Rancho Los Cerritos		4600 Virginia Rd. 33°50′22″N 118°11′42″W		Adobe structure on 4.7-acre (19,000 m^{2}) site is operated by the city as a historic site; formerly the center of a 27,000-acre (110 km^{2}) rancho.
16.52.020	Cooper Arms Apartments		455 E. Ocean Blvd. 33°46′1″N 118°11′13″W		Twelve-story Renaissance Revival apartment tower built in 1923.
16.52.030	Drake Park/Willmore City Historic Landmark District	Upload image			
16.52.040	Long Beach Community Hospital		1720 Termino Ave. 33°47′18″N 118°08′42″W		Spanish Colonial Revival Style hospital built 1922–1924 with courtyard patio and fountain centerpiece entered through an arcade.
16.52.050	Scottish Rite Cathedral		855 Elm Ave. 33°46′38″N 118°11′16″W		Scottish Rite Freemasonry building designed in Italian Renaissance-Romanesque Revival style.
16.52.060	Insurance Exchange Building		205 E. Broadway; 33°46′9″N 118°11′24″W		Also known as Middough Brothers-Insurance Exchange Building.
16.52.070	Recreation Park Golf Course Clubhouse		4900 East 7th St. 33°46′29″N 118°08′06″W		Spanish Colonial Revival recreation building built in the 1920s.
16.52.080	Bembridge House		953 Park Circle Dr. 33°46′45″N 118°12′4″W		Also known as Green-Rankin-Bembridge House; Ornate Queen Anne Victorian house built in 1906 with original carriage house and gazebo.
16.52.090	Cherry Avenue Lifeguard Station		1 Cherry Ave. (Ocean Blvd. and Cherry Ave.); 33°45′48″N 118°10′05″W		Three-story structure with hexagonal lookout tower built in 1938 as a WPA project; moved to Cherry Ave. in 1961.
16.52.100	William Benjamin Dearborn Simmons Tracker Pipe Organ	Upload image	5950 Willow St.		Antique organ built in Boston by William Benjamin Dearbon Simmons; purchased and restored in 1975 by Los Altos United Methodist Church.
16.52.110	Dr. Rowan Building		201-209 Pine Ave. 33°46′10″N 118°11′32″W		Art Deco commercial structure built in 1930 with terra cotta ornamentation.
16.52.120	Long Beach Municipal Auditorium Mural		3rd and Promenade		WPA Mosaic depicting beach recreation; created from 1936 to 1938 by Stanton MacDonald-Wright, Henry Nord, and Albert Henry King on the facade of the Municipal Auditorium; relocated in 1982 as a freestanding piece at the Promenade and Long Beach Plaza.
16.52.130	Heartwell-Lowe House	Upload image	2505 E. Second St. 33°45′56″N 118°09′44″W		Colonial Revival house built in 1919 for Col. Charles L. Heartwell.
16.52.140	St. Regis Building		1030 E. Ocean Blvd. 33°45′56″N 118°10′49″W		Luxurious apartment hotel built in 1920s combining Greek Revival and Renaissance Revival styles.
16.52.150	Fire Maintenance Station No. 10		1445 Peterson St.		Oldest fire station in Long Beach; built in 1925 with tall stepped gable; operated in recent years as the Long Beach Firefighter's Museum.
16.52.160	Leonie Pray House		4252 Country Club Dr. 33°50′02″N 118°11′47″W		English Tudor Revival house built in 1927; also known as Dawson-Pray House.
16.52.170	Skinny House		708 Gladys Ave. 33°46′32″N 118°09′27″W		
16.52.180	First National Bank of Long Beach		101-125 Pine Ave. 33°46′6″N 118°11′30″W		Also known as the Enloe Building.
16.52.190	Henry Clock House		4242 Pine Ave. 33°50′00″N 118°11′37″W		
16.52.200	Artaban Apartments		10 Atlantic Ave. 33°46′00″N 118°11′05″W		
16.52.210	Broadlind Hotel		149 Linden Ave. 33°46′08″N 118°11′11″W		
16.52.220 and 16.52.540	Masonic Temple	Upload image	230 Pine Ave. 33°46′11″N 118°11′32″W		
16.52.230	Matlock House	Upload image	1560 Ramillo Ave. 33°47′14″N 118°07′44″W		Designed by the architect Richard Neutra.
16.52.240	Moore House		5551 La Pasada St. 33°46′54″N 118°07′30″W		Designed by the architect Richard Neutra.
16.52.250	Olan Hafley House		5561 La Pasada St. 33°46′54″N 118°07′29″W		Designed by the architect Richard Neutra.
16.52.260	The Willmore		315 W. Third St. 33°46′15″N 118°11′40″W		
16.52.270	Lafayette Complex		130-140 Linden Ave. 33°46′07″N 118°11′10″W		East Village
16.52.280	Linden House		847 Linden Ave.		
16.52.290	Termo Company Building	Upload image	3275 Cherry Ave.		
16.52.300	Home Market Building		942-948 Daisy		
16.52.310	Farmers and Merchants Bank Office Tower		320 Pine Ave.		
16.52.320	Long Beach Professional Building		117 E. 8th St. 33°46′36″N 118°11′32″W		
16.52.330	Bixby Ranch House	Upload image	11 La Linda Drive		Los Cerritos
16.52.340	The Houser Building	Upload image	2740-2746 E. Broadway		
16.52.350	Harriman-Jones Clinic	Upload image	211 Cherry Ave		
16.52.360	Breakers Hotel		200-220 E. Ocean Blvd.		
16.52.370	Ocean Center Building		110 W. Ocean Blvd.		Meyer & Holler, design by Raymond M. Kennedy, 1929
16.52.380	Adelaide M. Tichenor House	Upload image	852 E. Ocean Blvd.		Greene and Greene, 1904
16.52.390	Californian Apartments		325 W. 3rd St.		
16.52.400	Crest Apartments		321 Chestnut Ave.		
16.52.410	Blackstone Hotel		330 W. Ocean Blvd.		
16.52.420	The Sovereign (Long Beach)		354-360 W. Ocean Blvd		This condominium property was initially built in 1922 as an "own-your-own" apartment building containing 95 units with architectural features intended to maximize the sea location effect. It also features a historical tattoo studio established in 1927.
16.52.430	Lord Mayor's Inn (Windham House)		435 Cedar Ave.		
16.52.450	Barker Brothers Building	Upload image	141 E. Broadway; 215 Promenade		
16.52.460	Buffums Autoport	Upload image	119-121 W. 1st St.		
16.52.470	Security Pacific National Bank Building		102-110 Pine Ave.		
16.52.480	American Hotel	Upload image	224-230 E. Broadway		Built in 1905
16.52.490	Art Deco Building at 312-316 Elm Avenue	Upload image	312-316 Elm Avenue		
16.52.500	First United Presbyterian Church		600 E. Fifth St.		
16.52.510	Walker's Department Store		401-423 Pine Ave.		
16.52.520	Engine Company No. 8		5365 E. 2nd St.		
16.52.530	Golden House	Upload image	628 W. 10th St.		(This appears to be an incorrect address as the Flossie Lewis House is also at this address.)
16.52.550	Pacific Tower (Long Beach, California)	Upload image	205-215 Long Beach Blvd.		
16.52.560	St. Anthony's Church	Upload image	540 Olive Ave.		
16.52.570	St. Luke's Episcopal Church	Upload image	703 Atlantic Ave.		
16.52.580	First Church of Christ Scientist		440 Elm Ave.		Later First Christian Church
16.52.590	Famous Department Store		601-609 Pine Ave.		Later Rite-Aid
16.52.600	Residence at 453 Cedar Avenue		453 Cedar Avenue		
16.52.610	Residence at 629 Atlantic Avenue		629 Atlantic Avenue		
16.52.620	Second Church of Christ Scientist		655 Cedar Ave. 33°44′55″N 118°11′35″W		
16.52.630	Christian Outreach Appeal Building		503-515 E. 3rd St.		Also known as First Methodist Episcopal Church
16.52.640	Long Beach Airport Terminal		4100 E. Donald Douglas Dr.		
16.52.650	Long Beach Museum of Art		2300 E. Ocean Blvd.		
16.52.660	Harnett House		730 Sunrise Blvd.		
16.52.670	Acres of Books		240 Long Beach Boulevard		
16.52.680	Cambridge Building		320 East Bixby Road		
16.52.690	Hancock Motors Building		500 E. Anaheim St.		
16.52.700	Cheney-Delaney Residence		2642 Chestnut Ave.		
16.52.710	James E. Porter Residence		351 Magnolia Ave.		
16.52.720	Meeker Building				
16.52.730 278	Long Beach Skating Palace		278 Alamitos Ave.		
16.52.740	Recreation Park bandshell				
16.52.750	Koffee Pot Cafe		955 E. 4th St.		Hexagonal novelty architecture with large coffee pot on roof, formerly known as the Hot Cha Cafe; it was originally a Victorian house and converted to its current form around 1932
16.52.760	Chancellor Apartments		1037 E. 1st St.		
16.52.770	Kress Building		445-455 Pine Ave.		
16.52.780	Gaytonia Apartment Building		212 Quincy Ave.		
16.52.790	Masonic Hall Commercial Building		5351-53 Long Beach Blvd.		
16.52.800	Art Theater Building		2025 E. 4th St.		
16.52.810	Ambassador Apartment Building		35 Alboni Place		
16.52.830	Merrill Building		810-812 Long Beach Blvd.		
16.52.840	Flossie Lewis House		628 West 10th St.		
16.52.860	Pressburg Residence		167 East South St.		
16.52.870	El Cordova Apartments (Rose Towers)		1728 E. 3rd St.		
16.52.890	Bank of Belmont Shore		5354 E. 2nd St.		
16.52.900	Castle Croydon		7th & Orizaba Ave.		
16.52.910	Ernest and Lillian McBride Home		1461 Lemon Ave.		
16.52.920	Dolly Varden Hotel Rooftop Sign		335 Pacific Ave.		
16.52.930	Le Grande Apartments		635 East 9th St.		
16.52.940	Silver Bow Apartments		330 Cedar Ave.		
16.52.950	Casa Aitken		725 E. 8th St.		
16.52.960	St. John's Missionary Baptist Church		732 E. 10th St.		
16.52.970	James C. Beer Residence		1503 E. Ocean Blvd.		
16.52.980	Garvey House		1728 East 7th St.		
16.52.990	Bay Hotel		318 Elm Ave.		
16.52.1000	Ringheim-Wells House		4031 E. 5th St.		
16.52.1010	Kale House		853 Linden Ave.		
16.52.1020	Foster & Kleiser Building		1428 Magnolia Ave.		
16.52.1030	Anna R. Brown Residence		1205 E. Ocean Blvd.		
16.52.1040	Butler Residence		251 Junipero Ave.		
16.52.1050	Long Beach Unity Church		935 E. Broadway		
16.52.1060	Packard Motors Building		205 East Anaheim St.		
16.52.1070	American Legion Post No. 560 (Houghton Post)		1215 E. 59th St.		
16.52.1080	Phillips House		5917 Lemon Ave.		
16.52.1090	1163 Appleton Street House		1163 Appleton Street		
16.52.2000	1169-75 Appleton Street House		1169-75 Appleton Street		
16.52.2010	Parsonage		640 Pacific Ave.		
16.52.2020	Esser House		1001 E. 1st St.		
16.52.2030	Sunnyside Cemetery		1095 E. Willow St.		

== Other Long Beach sites also recognized ==
The Long Beach Historic Landmarks listed above include many of the most important historic sites in the City of Long Beach. Some others within the City of Long Beach have been listed on the National Register of Historic Places or designated as California Historical Landmarks. These are:

Name	Image	Address	Neighborhood	Description
RMS Queen Mary		Pier J, 1126 Queensway Hwy. 33°45′10″N 118°11′23″W		Art Deco transatlantic luxury ocean liner built in 1936 in Scotland, fastest ocean liner from 1936 to 1952, extensively gutted and converted for use as a hotel/museum/convention center after being purchased from the Cunard Line in 1967 by Long Beach.
US Post Office-Long Beach Main		300 Long Beach Blvd. 33°46′22″N 118°11′20″W		Moderne structure built from 1933 to 1934 as a project of the Works Progress Administration
Jennie A. Reeve House		4260 Country Club Dr. 33°50′3″N 118°11′41″W		Craftsman house designed by Greene & Greene
Puvunga Indian Village Sites		Address Restricted		

== See also ==
- National Register of Historic Places listings in Los Angeles County
- Los Angeles Historic-Cultural Monuments in the Harbor area
- List of locally designated landmarks by U.S. state
