= Acres of Books =

Defunct independent bookstore in California

Coordinates: 33.7700°N 118.1890°W

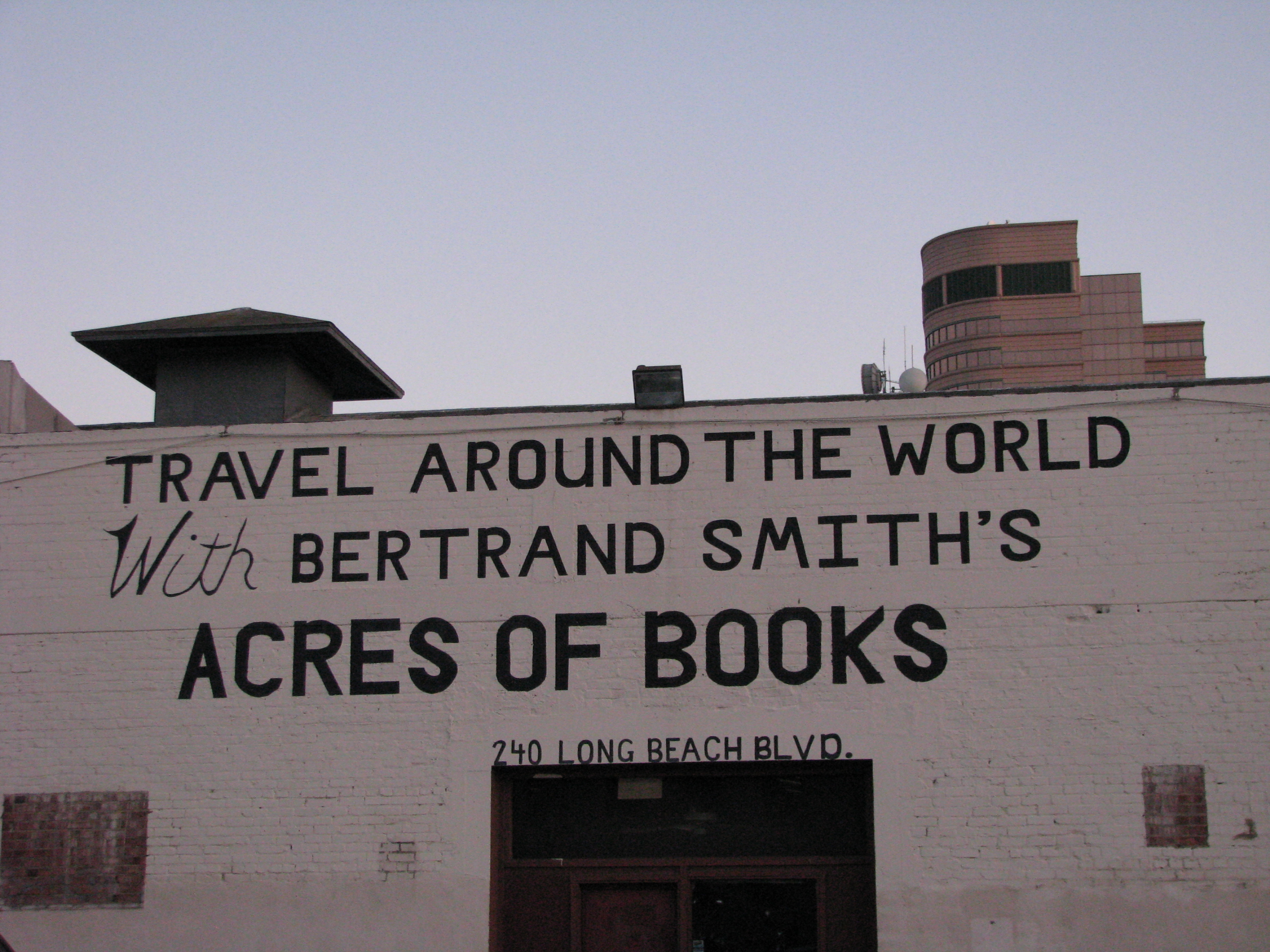
Acres of Books sign

Acres of Books was a large independent bookstore in downtown Long Beach, California from 1934 to 2008.

== Background ==
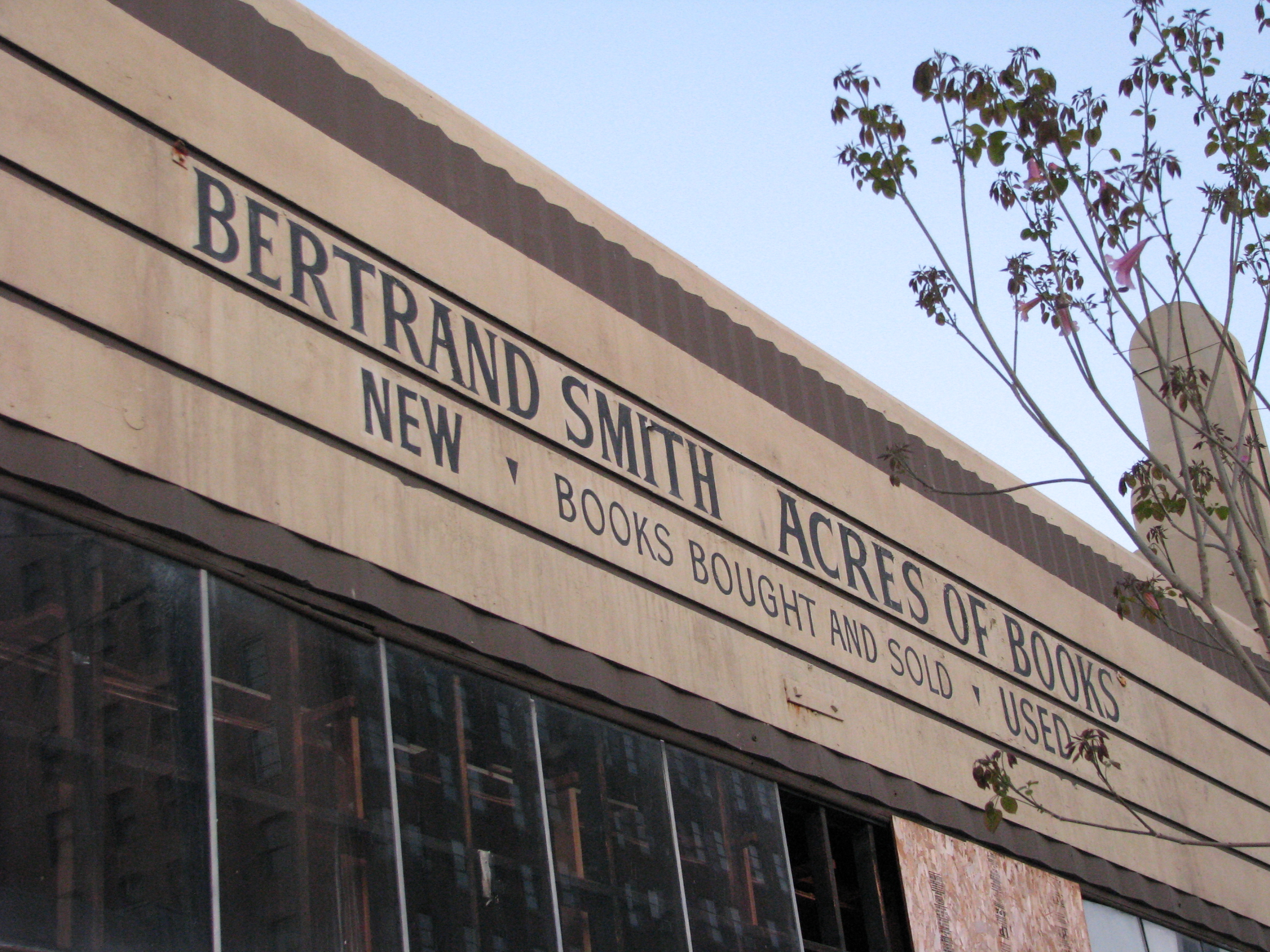
Signage

The business was founded in Cincinnati, Ohio, in 1927 by Bertrand Smith. In 1934 Smith moved to California and established the store in Long Beach; he moved to the current address at 240 Long Beach Boulevard in 1960. Acres of Books was the largest and oldest family-owned second-hand bookstore in California, claiming to have in stock over one million books.

In 1959 Smith gave to the people of Long Beach a collection of rare books, some dating back to the 15th century. Included in the collection is a two volume facsimile of the Gutenberg Bible, all of which is housed as part of the Loraine and Earl Burns Miller Special Collections Room at the main branch of the Long Beach public library.

In 1990 Acres of Books was designated a cultural heritage landmark by the City of Long Beach.

== Notable customers ==
In its long history, Acres of Books' customers included Jack Vance, Upton Sinclair, Stan Freberg, Gary Owens, James Hilton, Greg Bear, Tim Powers, Thurston Moore, Mike Watt, Paul Schrader, Fran Lebowitz, Robert Easton, Eli Wallach, Diane Keaton, Larry McMurtry, and, most notably, Ray Bradbury, who immortalized the store in his essay "I Sing the Bookstore Eclectic". Robert Bloch name-checked the store in his 1978 novel Strange Eons.

== Closure and redevelopment ==
Acres of Books closed on October 18, 2008. The owners sold the 12,000-square-foot (1,100 m^{2}) property to the Long Beach Redevelopment Agency for $2.8 million. Subsequently, the Redevelopment Agency was dissolved by order of Governor Jerry Brown.

There was at one time a proposal to develop the site as an art exchange, but nothing came of that. As of late 2023, the premises were neatly maintained but displayed no commercial signage.

== See also ==
- List of City of Long Beach Historic Landmarks
- The bookstore appeared in the film The Jane Austen Book Club
