= The Sovereign (Long Beach) =

- Long Beach Historic Landmark
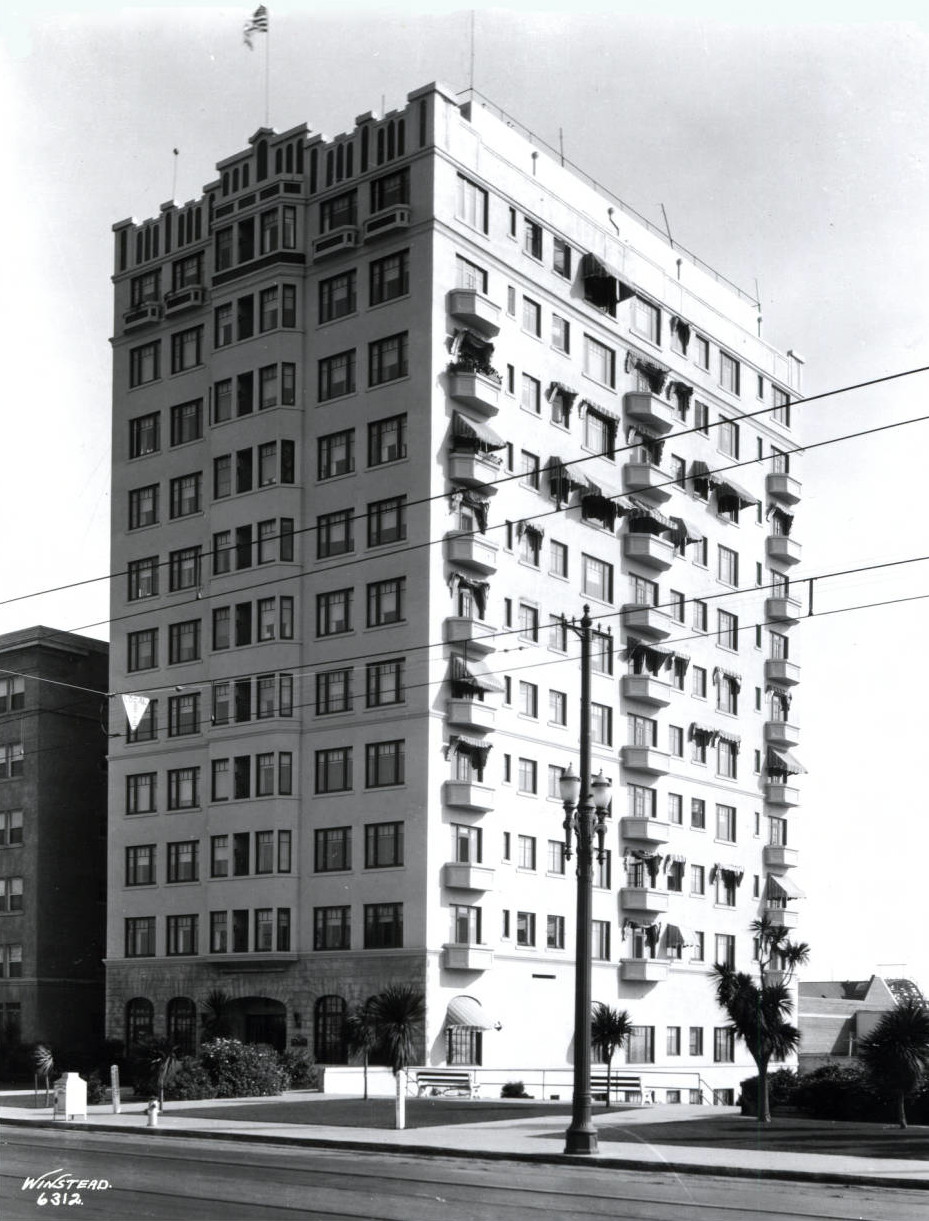
- 1929
- Location: 360 W. Ocean Blvd., Long Beach, California
- Built: 1923
- Architect: Charles McKenzie

The Sovereign is a historic condominium building on Ocean Boulevard in Downtown Long Beach, California. It was constructed in 1923, and marketed as "own-your-own" luxury apartments.

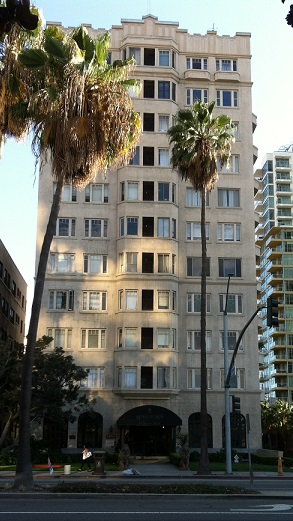
2016

== See also ==
- List of City of Long Beach historic landmarks
