= Breakers Hotel (Long Beach, California) =

- Interactive map of the Breakers Hotel area
- Hotel chain: Fairmont Hotels & Resorts
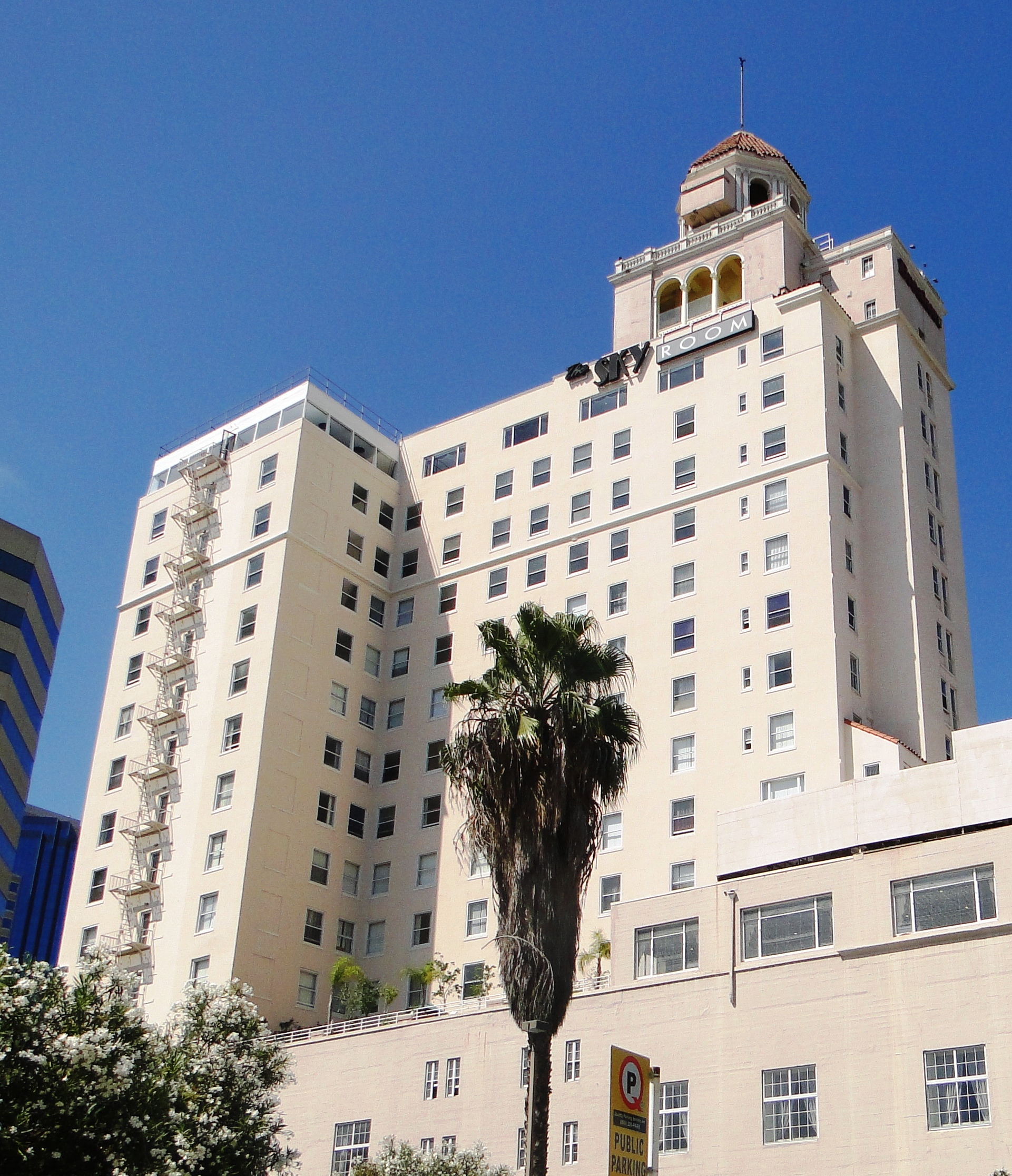
- Breakers Hotel, September 2009

- Location within the Los Angeles metropolitan area Location within California Location within the United States
- 33.766435°N 118.19048°W
- Location: 200–220 East Ocean Blvd., Long Beach, California

History
- Built: 1926

Site notes
- Architect: Walker & Eisen
- Architectural style: Romanesque or Spanish Renaissance
- Governing body: private
- Website: https://www.fairmont.com/breakers-long-beach/

Long Beach Historic Landmark

The Fairmont Breakers Long Beach is a historic landmark 14-story hotel on East Ocean Avenue in downtown Long Beach, California. Founded in 1926 as an oceanfront resort hotel, it reopened in 2024 after a complete restoration. The building has been designated a Long Beach Historic Landmark and the hotel is a member of Historic Hotels of America, an official program of the National Trust for Historic Preservation.

== History ==
=== Development and opening (1925–1927) ===
The Breakers Hotel was developed by a local Long Beach banker and capitalist, Fred B. Dunn. Construction began in fall 1925, with a projected cost of $2,250,000. The original structure consisted of a single-story base that spanned an entire city block with a central tower rising thirteen stories above the main body of the building. The complex also included arcade and basement floors beneath the Ocean Boulevard level. The hotel's architecture was described at the time as "ultra Spanish." At the time, the total cost was said to be $3,000,000. The building opened in September 1926 with a banquet and dinner at which Long Beach's Mayor Fillmore Condit and Fred Dunn spoke. The banquet also included a program of entertainment by vaudeville artists.

The hotel opened three years before the nearby Villa Riviera, so its imposing tower, rising 15 stories from the beach, gave it "a prominence greater than that of any other in the city." On its opening, the Breakers was promoted as one of Southern California's finest luxury resort hotels. The hotel had 330 guest rooms and 232 ft (71 m) of prime ocean frontage in downtown Long Beach. Other features of the hotel included an elaborate 500-seat dining room known as the "Hall of Galleons," roof garden, coffee shop, beauty shop, barber shop, Victorian Turkish baths, and "smart shops." The hotel catered to "surf bathers" with a special elevator that transported the bathers, after they had "donned their bathing suits in their rooms," to the Arcade level, from which there was an entrance to the beach.

One of the hotel's unusual features was the availability of radio broadcasts in each guest room. An October 1926 article in the Los Angeles Times described the "outstanding" in-room entertainment feature as follows:

Each room in the new hostelry has four radio jets, each connecting with the radio-receiving room in the tower. By plugging in on any of these four jets, programs from broadcasting stations are heard ... If there is a particular program on the air which a guest particularly desires to hear, it is only necessary to phone the receiving room and the operator will tune it in.

At its opening, the Breakers was available for both temporary guests and others who made it their permanent residence. The hotel was expected to "be the means of attracting thousands of people to Long Beach."

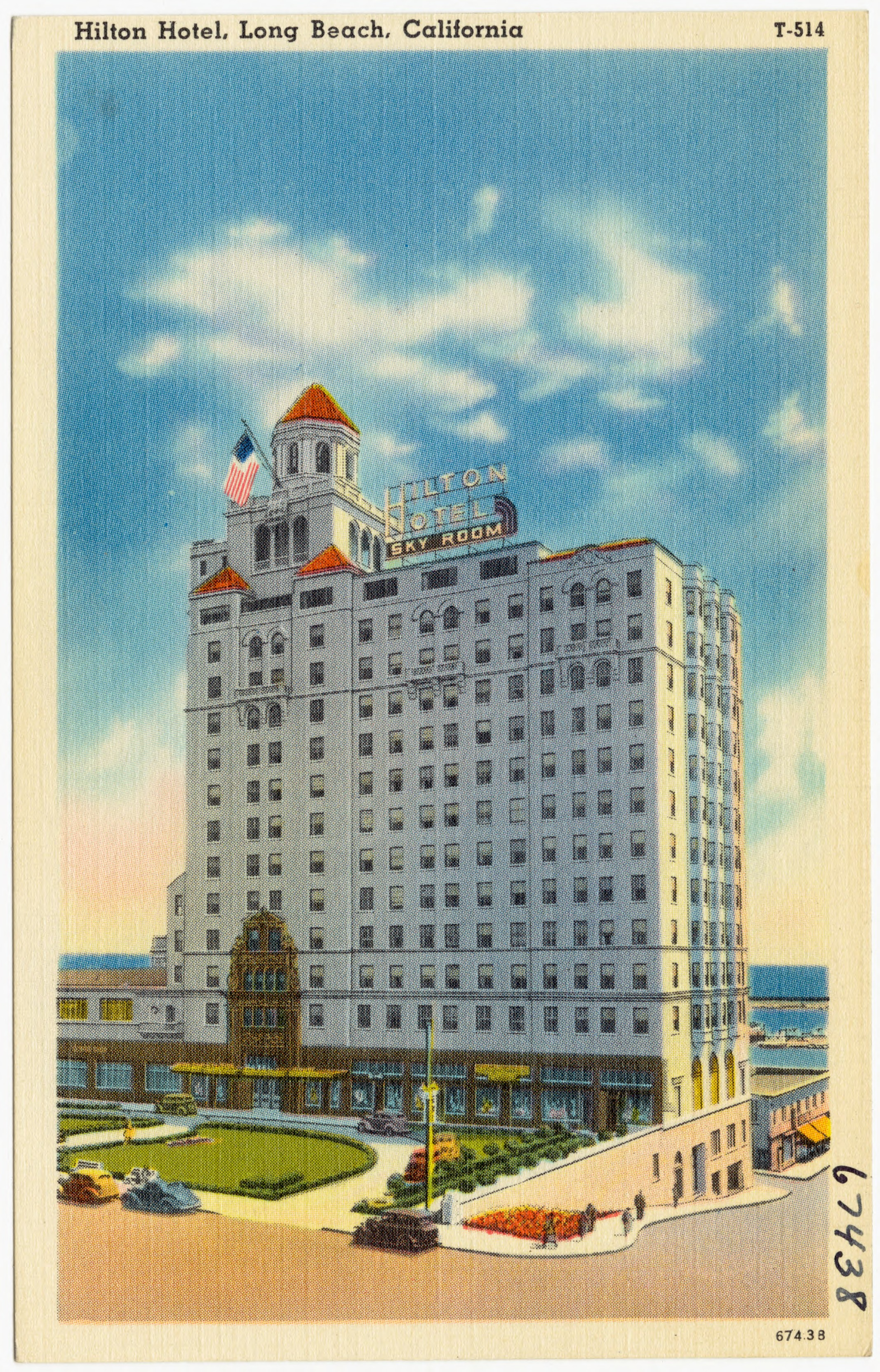
The hotel depicted on a 1940s postcard

=== Years of decline (1929–1935) ===
Less than a year after its opening, the hotel was sold by Fred Dunn to an unnamed group of investors from Pasadena, Los Angeles and New York. The sale price in 1927 was reported to be $1,750,000. The new owners announced plans for extensive remodeling, including the closure of several dining rooms and conversion of the ballroom into a summer garden.

The onset of the Great Depression and the 1933 Long Beach earthquake pushed the Breakers into bankruptcy. The 1933 Long Beach earthquake, which resulted in over 100 deaths, caused only minor damage to the Breakers, but the widespread destruction in Long Beach caused major damage to the city's tourist trade. The hotel served as the headquarters for the Red Cross relief efforts following the earthquake. In August 1934, the Los Angeles Times reported that the hotel had sustained a significant operating loss in 1933 and was delinquent on its real estate and personal properties taxes for the past three years.

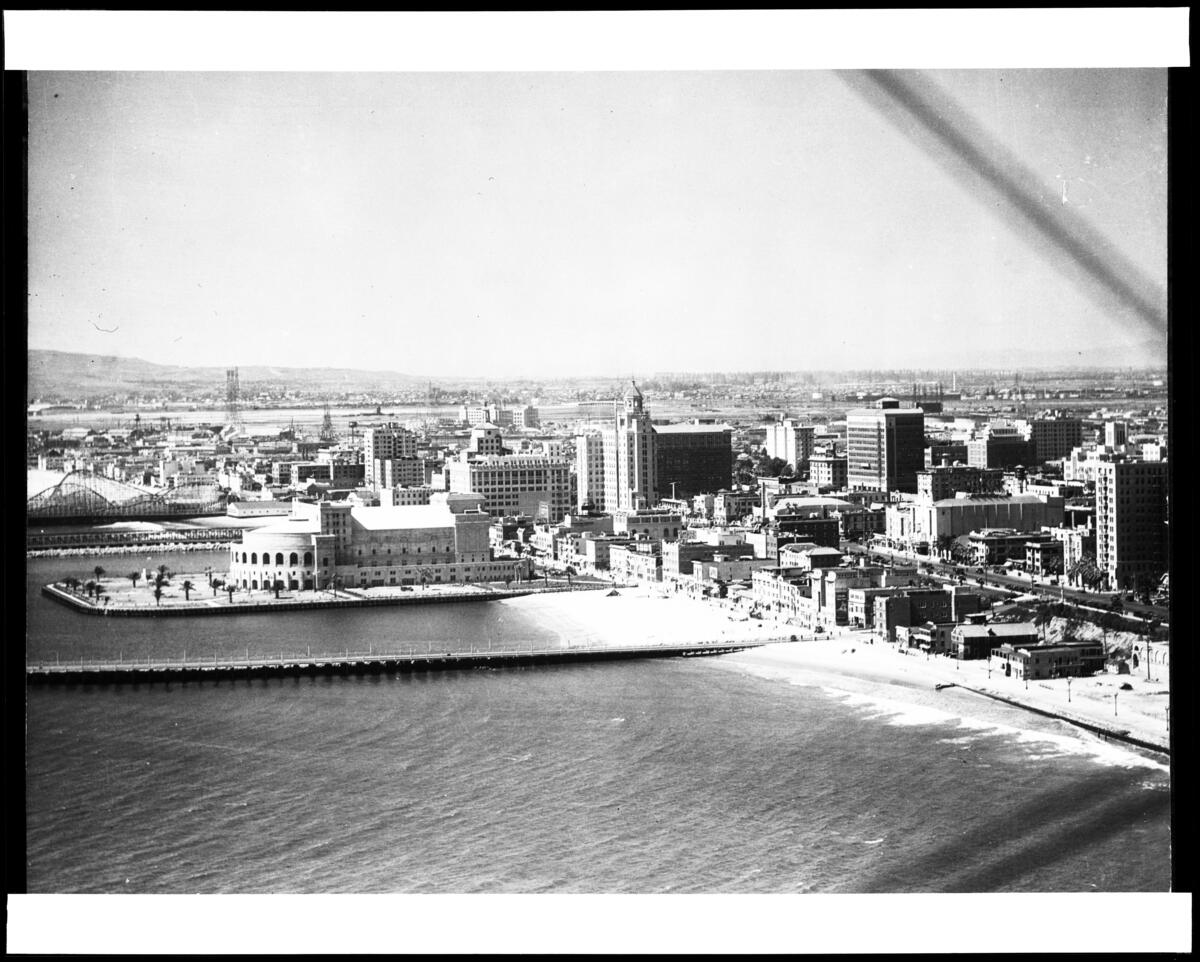
Aerial view of Municipal Auditorium, Rainbow Pier, and the Breakers, c. 1935

=== Hilton years and Sky Room (1938–1947) ===
In 1938, the hotel was purchased by Conrad Hilton at a reported cost of $150,000 and $35,000 in back taxes. Hilton renamed the Breakers the Hilton Hotel, the eighth hotel in the Hilton chain. Hilton spent at least $200,000 on renovations and converted the penthouse into the Sky Room restaurant, which became one of the most popular gathering spots in Southern California. Movie stars like Clark Gable, Errol Flynn, Rita Hayworth, Cary Grant and John Wayne were said to have been customers at the Sky Room. One customer recalled the Sky Room as: "a dating place, like the Brown Derby and Coconut Grove. It was the place to go."

During World War II, two pillboxes with gun-mountings were installed on the rooftop for harbor defense, and the Sky Room became the official Airwatch headquarters for Long Beach harbor. One of the pillboxes and gun mountings remained intact on the roof as late as 1991.

=== Wilton (1947–1961) ===
In 1947, Hilton sold the hotel to Frank Fishman, who renamed it the Wilton Hotel. During the 1950s, the hotel changed ownership several times, and promises to spend hundreds of thousands of dollars to remodel the aging hotel were not kept. An episode of The Lone Wolf, "The Long Beach Story", featured the Wilton.

=== Breakers International and closure (1961–1964) ===
In 1961, the hotel was purchased by Fred Miller, one of the founders of the Flying Tigers Line, who had purchased US Airlines in 1951. Miller renamed the hotel the Breakers International Hotel and spent $1.25 million refurbishing the property from top to bottom. Miller reportedly hoped to "recapture, for Long Beach, the beauty, dignity and service of the city's greatest hotel." However, Miller was not able to turn around the resort's fortunes. In 24 months as owner, Miller reported that he lost half of his net worth. In November 1963, Miller gave up and closed the hotel.

The Long Beach Press-Telegram pronounced the hotel "a dead behemoth on the beach." Others noted the hotel's over-reliance on convention business: "This hotel had to try to make 80 percent of its revenues from convention business. There is no rail service or air service to Long Beach, and the 20-minute run on the freeway to Los Angeles where the industry is hurts all the hotels." One commentator opined, "God and Conrad Hilton couldn't have saved this hotel." The hotel's head bellman, Paul Grantham, who had been employed at the hotel since 1928, blamed the "coming of the motels."

In January 1964, the hotel was sold at auction to pay off its creditors. Despite an appraised value of $4.3 million for the land and improvements, the property sold for just $1.75 million to Long Beach realtor Harvey Miller, who announced plans to convert the structure into a retirement hotel. The hotel remained shuttered for nearly three years as plans stalled, and the vacant building was referred to as "the West Coast's largest pigeon roost."

=== Retirement hotel (1967–1982) ===
In September 1966, the hotel re-opened as the New Breakers International Hotel, a combination residential retirement hotel and transient hotel for overnight guests. By January 1967, the property was occupied 70% by permanent residents, who had the option of an American plan at $175 per month including hotel conveniences and three meals a day, or a European plan at $115 a month without meals.

In 1975, the residential retirement hotel was refurbished again. The renovations included all new carpets, drapes, furnishings, automated elevators, and an updated phone system. The owners stated their intention to create the ultimate in retirement living for the senior citizens of Long Beach. In 1978, New Breakers Hotel Company sold the property to Stoneridge Management Company for less than $3 million.

=== Conversion back to hotel use (1982–1988) ===
In 1982, the building was partially converted back into a hotel. It underwent a $15 million renovation and restoration, which was completed in 1985.

On August 1, 1986, the fully reopened Breakers Hotel was placed under the management of Jack Wrather's Wrather Port Properties, which also managed the city's major tourist destinations, the Spruce Goose and the Queen Mary. At this point, the Breakers contained 242 guest rooms, including 20 suites, a restaurant and night club on the top floor, and a ballroom restored to its original 1920s decor. The Sky Room, which had been given a Polynesian theme by prior owners, was renovated in an Art Deco style. At the time of the re-opening, the Los Angeles Times wrote: "Its 60 years have been a roller-coaster ride of ups and downs, prosperity and penury, bright lights and gloomy emptiness. Just now, its direction is up."

The excitement about the Breakers' restoration was short-lived. The hotel failed to draw a sufficient number of guests to turn a profit and closed its doors again on January 14, 1988.

=== Designation as Historic Landmark (1989) ===
In 1989, the Breakers, still vacant after its closure in 1988, was designated a Long Beach Historical Landmark, requiring approval from the Cultural Heritage Commission before making any major changes in the building's appearance.

=== Senior citizen housing (1990–2015) ===
The property was purchased following its 1988 closure by Ocean Boulevard Associates, which spent $23 million on earthquake retrofitting and restoring its 1920s-style Romanesque architecture. The Breakers re-opened in November 1990 as an "Assisted Living" Residence for senior citizens. As of October 1991, the Breakers had 38 residents, with an average age of 84, paying rents starting at $1,000 a month, including three meals a day, housekeeping and local transportation. An in-house Medical Staff provided medication administration and routine activities for those in need of leadership. The facility closed in March 2015, after state authorities revoked its license.

=== Renovated Sky Room (1997–2018) ===
In 1997, the Sky Room, originally developed by Conrad Hilton in 1938, was restored and re-opened by the property's new owner Bernard Rosenson. Rosenson restored the Art Deco look of the Sky Room and redesigned it to focus on its 360-degree view. The new Sky Room offered an "ultra-retro menu" and music by a swing and jazz band called the Sky Room Orchestra. The restaurant had a separate entrance and a special dedicated elevator, so that it would not break California laws forbidding restaurants from operating in retirement homes. The restaurant remained open as a separate concessionaire after the retirement home closed and the building was sold, but both the Sky Room and the adjoining Cielo bar closed in April 2018, in preparation for the structure's conversion back to a hotel.

=== Restoration as a hotel (2017–Present) ===
In November 2017, Pacific6, a Long Beach based investment and development partnership, assembled by Long Beach businessman and philanthropist John Molina with partners Kevin Davis, Robert Gordon, Jon Heiman, Todd Lemmis and David Telling, purchased the building and announced their intention to fully restore the Breakers and operate it as a 185 room luxury boutique hotel, The Breakers Hotel & Spa.

On July 28, 2022, it was announced that the restored hotel would be managed by the luxury Fairmont Hotels and Resorts chain as Fairmont Breakers Long Beach. It reopened on November 19, 2024.

== See also ==
- List of City of Long Beach Historic Landmarks
