= Insurance Exchange Building =

Coordinates: 33°46′10″N 118°11′27″W

- U.S. National Register of Historic Places
- Long Beach Historic Landmark
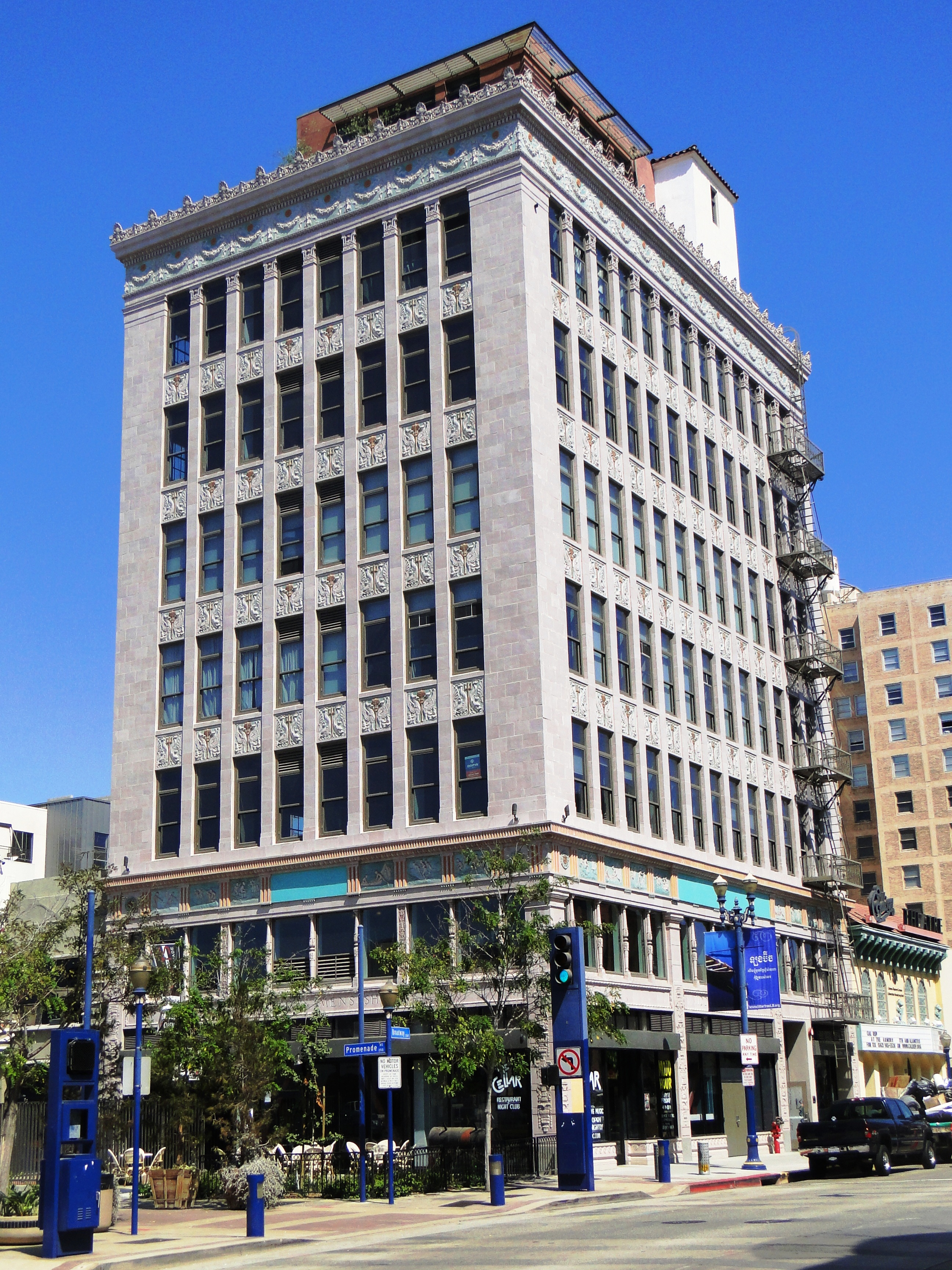
- Insurance Exchange Building, September 2009

- Location within the Los Angeles metropolitan area Location within California Location within the United States
- Location: 205 E. Broadway, Long Beach, California
- Built: 1925
- Architect: Harvey H. Lochridge
- Architectural style: Early Commercial, Beaux Arts
- NRHP reference No.: 03000002
- Added to NRHP: February 5, 2003

The Insurance Exchange Building, formerly known as the Middough Building and the Middough Brothers Building, is a registered historic building located on Broadway in downtown Long Beach, California, USA. The eight-story Beaux Arts building was one of the largest office buildings in downtown Long Beach when it opened in 1925. The building was added to the National Register of Historic Places in 2003.

== Description and history ==
The Insurance Exchange Building was known as the Middough Building when it opened in 1925. The eight-story office building was built by Lorne and Way Middough who moved their men's and boy's clothing store into the first floor.

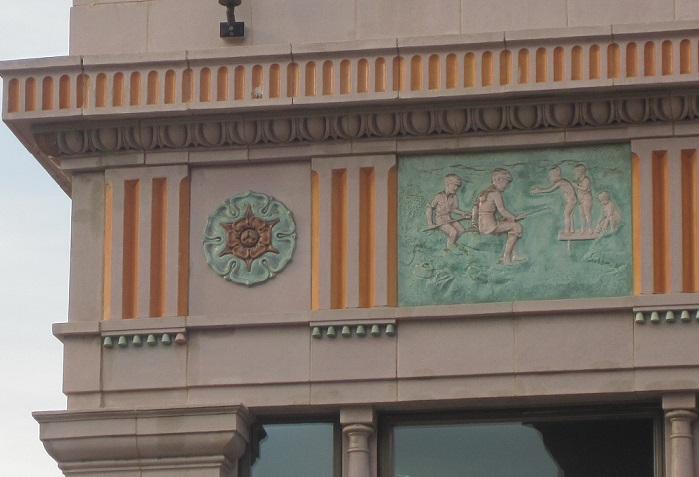
Relief

The newly formed Long Beach Municipal Court was one of the building's original tenants, moving into the third, fifth and sixth floors in July 1925. The court remained in the building for five years until additional space was needed for other courts and county offices.

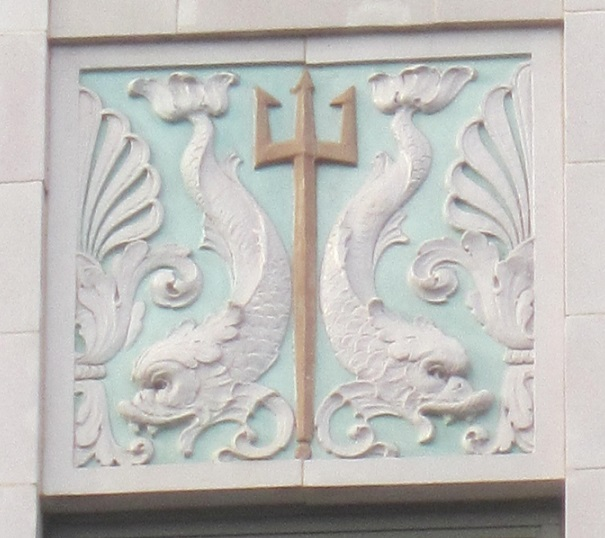
Relief

In 1931, the Middough brothers sold the building, and its name was changed to the Insurance Exchange Building.

With 28,000 square feet (2,601 m^{2}) of floor space, the building was one of the largest office structures in downtown Long Beach. In 1958, the building was sold, and the new owners announced plans to remodel and modernize the building and to establish a "de luxe restaurant" on the top floor. At the time of the sale in 1958, stockbrokers, Dean Witter & Co., occupied the ground floor, and other major tenants included Household Finance Co. and Veloz and Yolanda dance studio.

In 1962, the building was sold again at a reported purchase price of $750,000. The new owner, Don Roberts Co. Inc. of Beverly Hills, announced plans to turn the building into a center for insurance companies and their representatives.

In February 2003, the building was added to the National Register of Historic Places. In 2007, the building was one of the first upgrade projects to be completed as part of The Promenade redevelopment of the downtown area. The upgrade project included a nightclub and Jamaican restaurant.

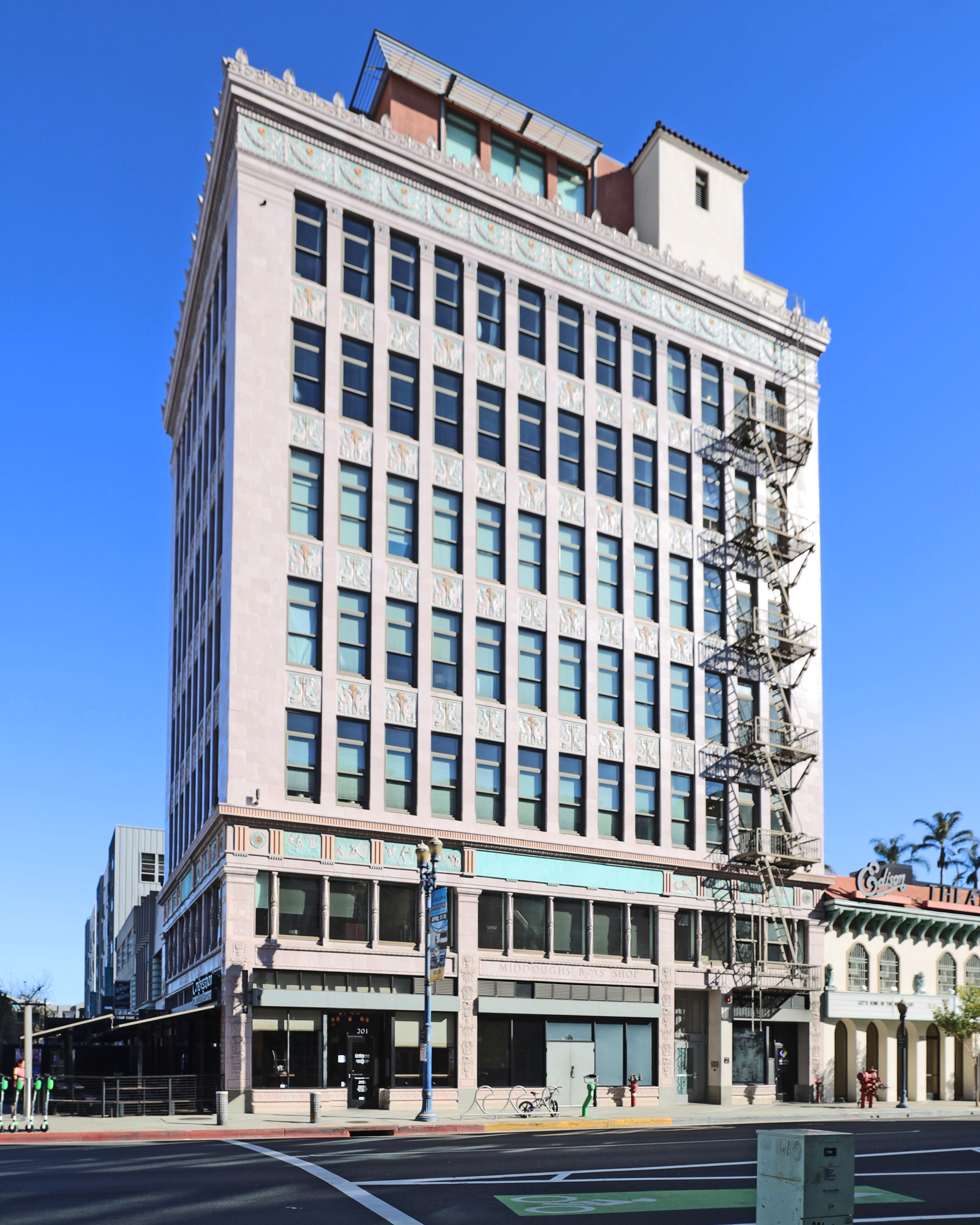
Insurance Exchange Building

== See also ==
- List of City of Long Beach Historic Landmarks
- National Register of Historic Places listings in Los Angeles County, California
