= First Congregational Church (Long Beach, California) =

Historic church in California, United States

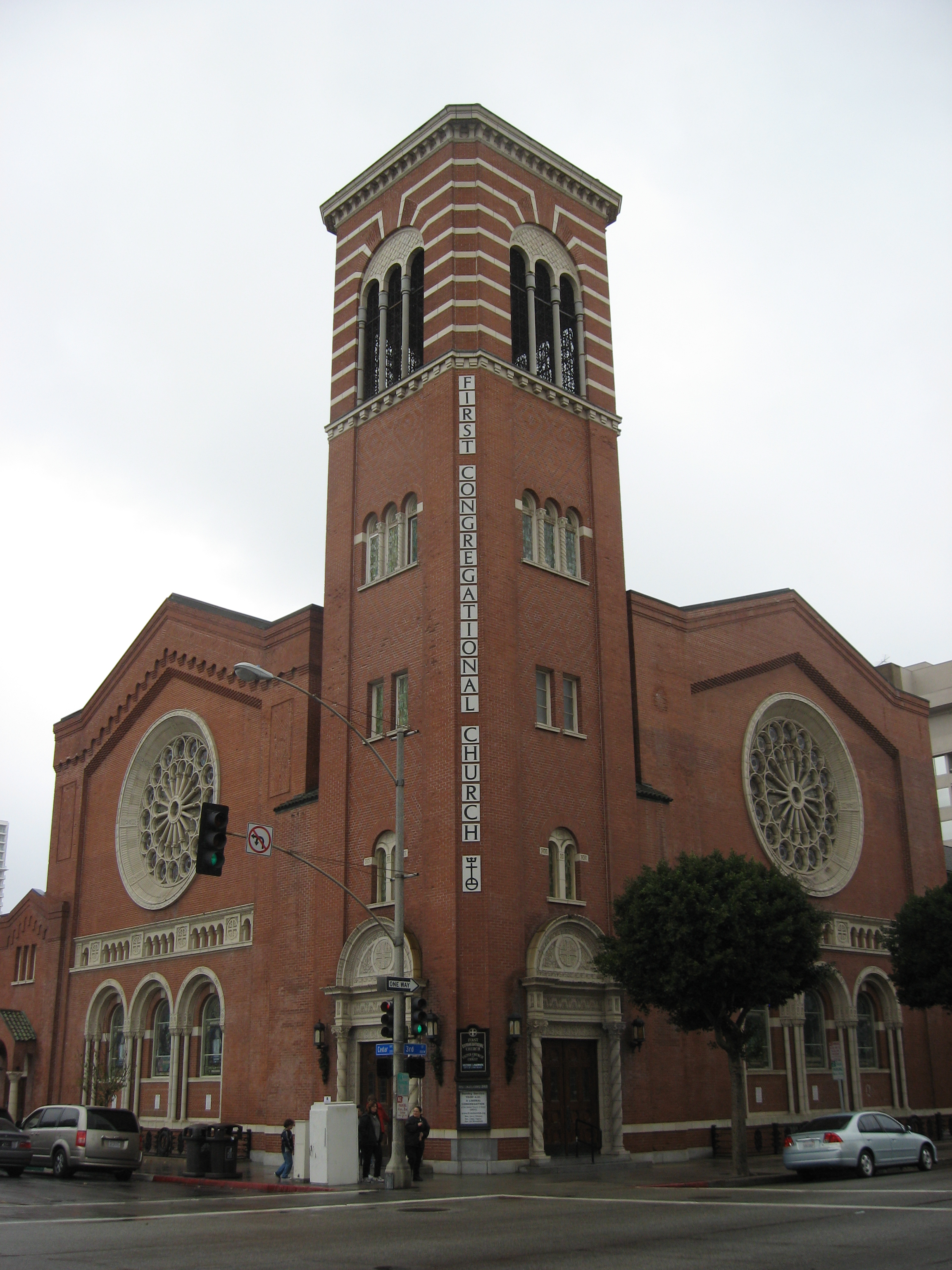
- First Congregational Church, February 2008
- First Congregational Church
- 33°46′13″N 118°11′43″W
- Location: 241 Cedar Ave., Long Beach, California
- Country: United States
- Denomination: United Church of Christ
- Churchmanship: Congregationalist
- Website: www.firstchurchlb.org

History
- Status: Church
- Founded: 1888
- Dedicated: December 1914

Architecture
- Functional status: Active
- Architect: H. M. Patterson
- Architectural type: Italian Romanesque Revival
- Completed: 1914
- Construction cost: $210,000
- First Congregational Church of Long Beach
- U.S. National Register of Historic Places
- Long Beach Historic Landmark
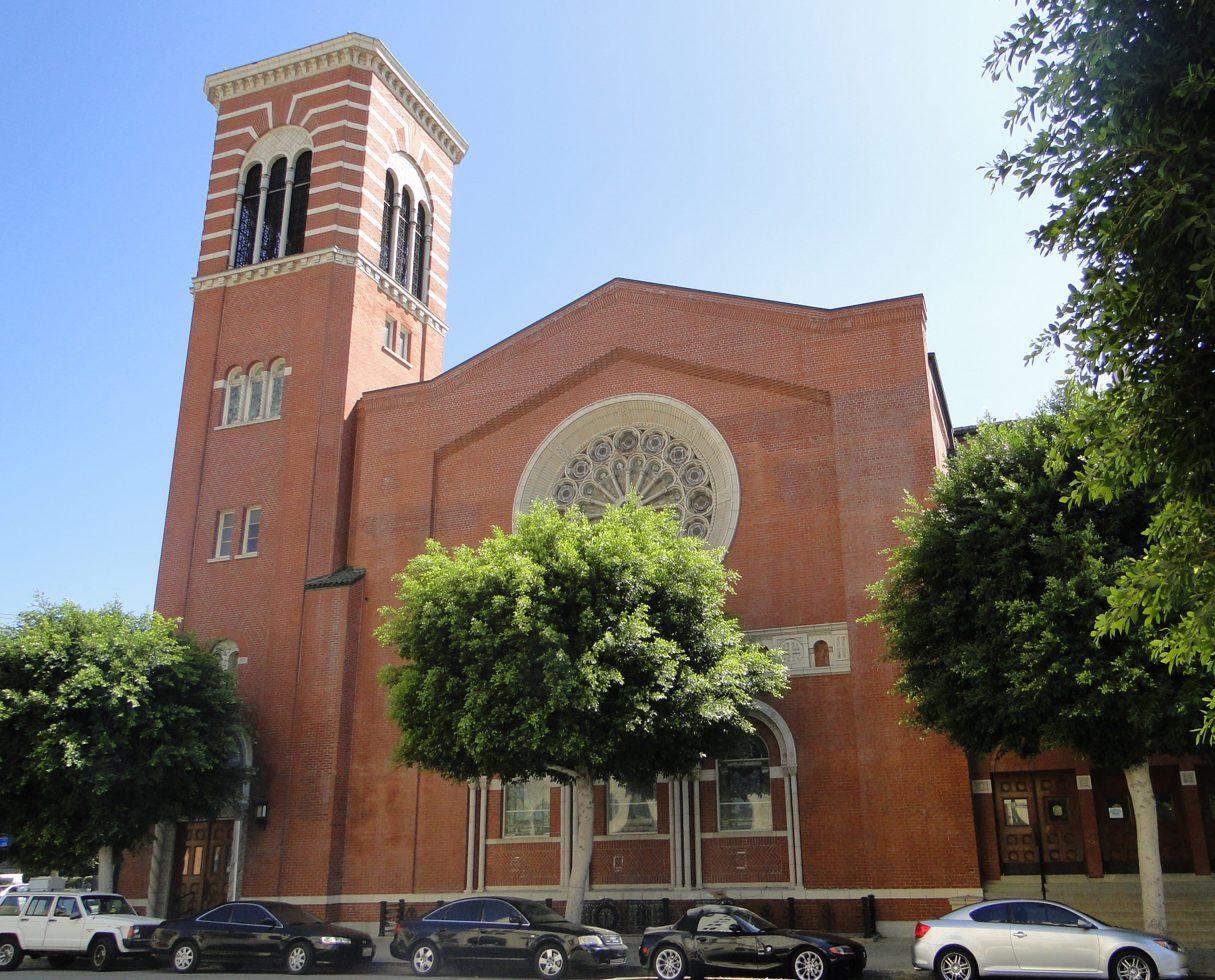
- The church in September 2009
- NRHP reference No.: 12000810
- Added to NRHP: September 25, 2012

First Congregational Church is a church of the United Church of Christ located in downtown Long Beach, California. The church occupies a historic red brick structure that was built in 1914. The Italian Romanesque Revival building has been designated as a Long Beach Historic Landmark and was added to the National Register of Historic Places in 2012.

== Construction and architecture ==
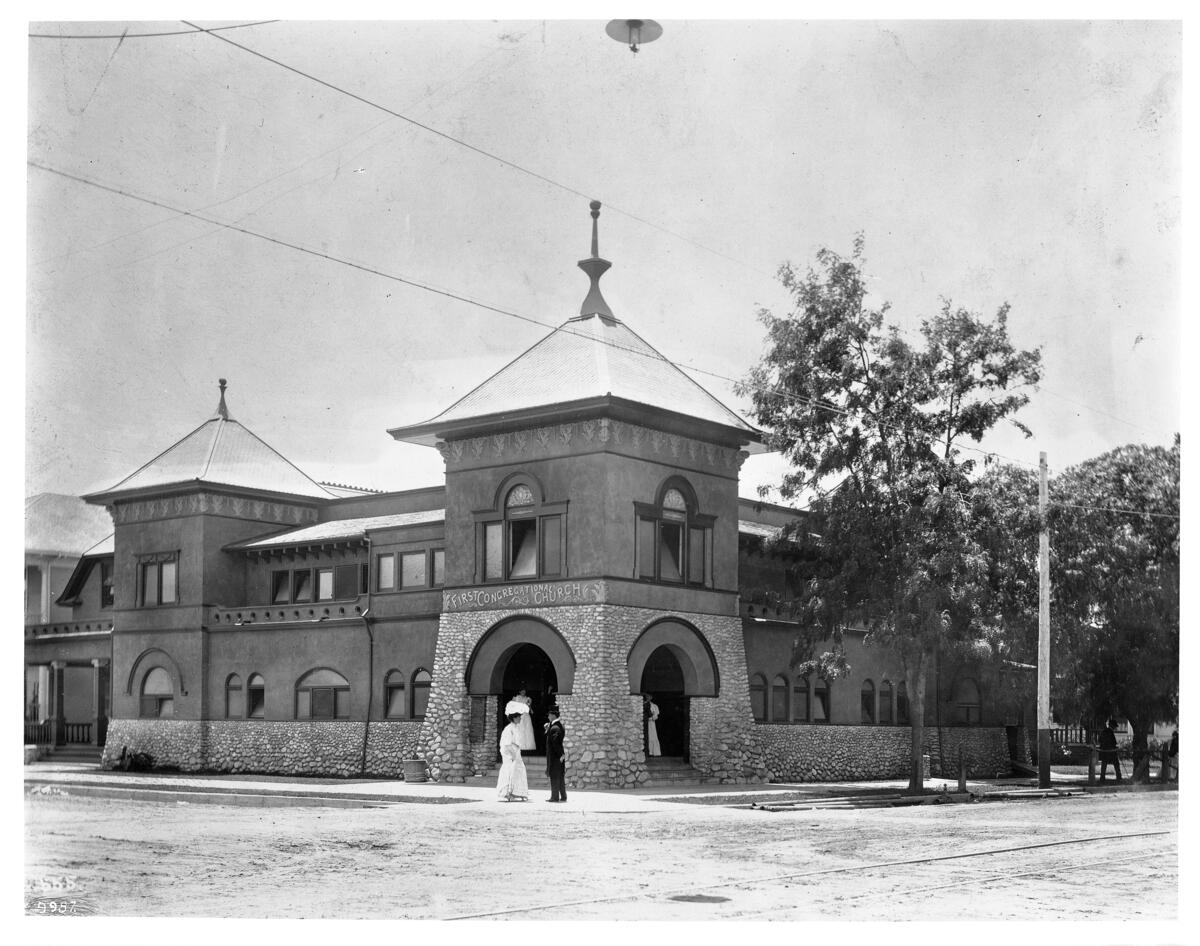
Exterior view of the First Congregational Church in Long Beach, ca.1905

The church was founded in 1888. The current church building, designed in the Italian Romanesque style, was completed in 1914 at a total cost of $210,000. Jotham Bixby Sr., known as the "Father of Long Beach", was the largest contributor to the construction fund, having given $25,000. The building was designed in the Romanesque style by architect H.M. Patterson of Los Angeles and built of red pressed brick laid in patterns and trimmed with white terra cotta. The large auditorium had the capacity for seating 1,500 persons. The Los Angeles Times wrote that the "immense auditorium, the roof of which is fifty-five feet above the floor, gives one the impression he is entering one of the cathedrals of Europe." The Times also referred to the church's art-glass windows as being "among the finest to be seen in the West." The church also featured three great rose windows above the gallery and six picture windows below the gallery. The center window was called the "Light of the World."

== History ==
The church building was dedicated in December 1914 with more than 2,000 Congregationalists in attendance. The Los Angeles Times described the church as "magnificent" and reported that its "architecture and appointments are without peer in Southern California." It was the largest church in Southern California when it opened.

In 1924, a three-story education building with an auditorium was added to the campus. By 1927, the congregation had grown to become the fifth largest Congregational church in the United States with 1,700 members.

The church sustained extensive damage in the 1933 Long Beach earthquake and was closed for several months while repairs were made. Rev. Henry Kendall Booth was the pastor at the church from 1909 until his death in 1942.

The church appeared in the 2007 movie License to Wed.

== Social activism and theology ==
The church practices a liberal theology and has a long history of social activism, including programs to assist the poor, homeless and disabled. In 1992, the church publicly declared that it welcomed gay, lesbian, bisexual and transgender persons into membership, employment and leadership. By 2005, 42% of the church members were from the gay, lesbian, bisexual and transgender community.

In 2007, the church gained media attention when the senior pastor, Jerald Stinson, vowed to defy an order that he block homeless people from sleeping on the steps and grounds of the church. At the time, Stinson said, "The city's threats are ludicrous. We're not going to do what they want us to do. Allowing these people to sleep on our property is, for us, a religious act."

== See also ==
- List of City of Long Beach Historic Landmarks
