= Long Beach Professional Building =

- U.S. National Register of Historic Places
- Long Beach Historic Landmark
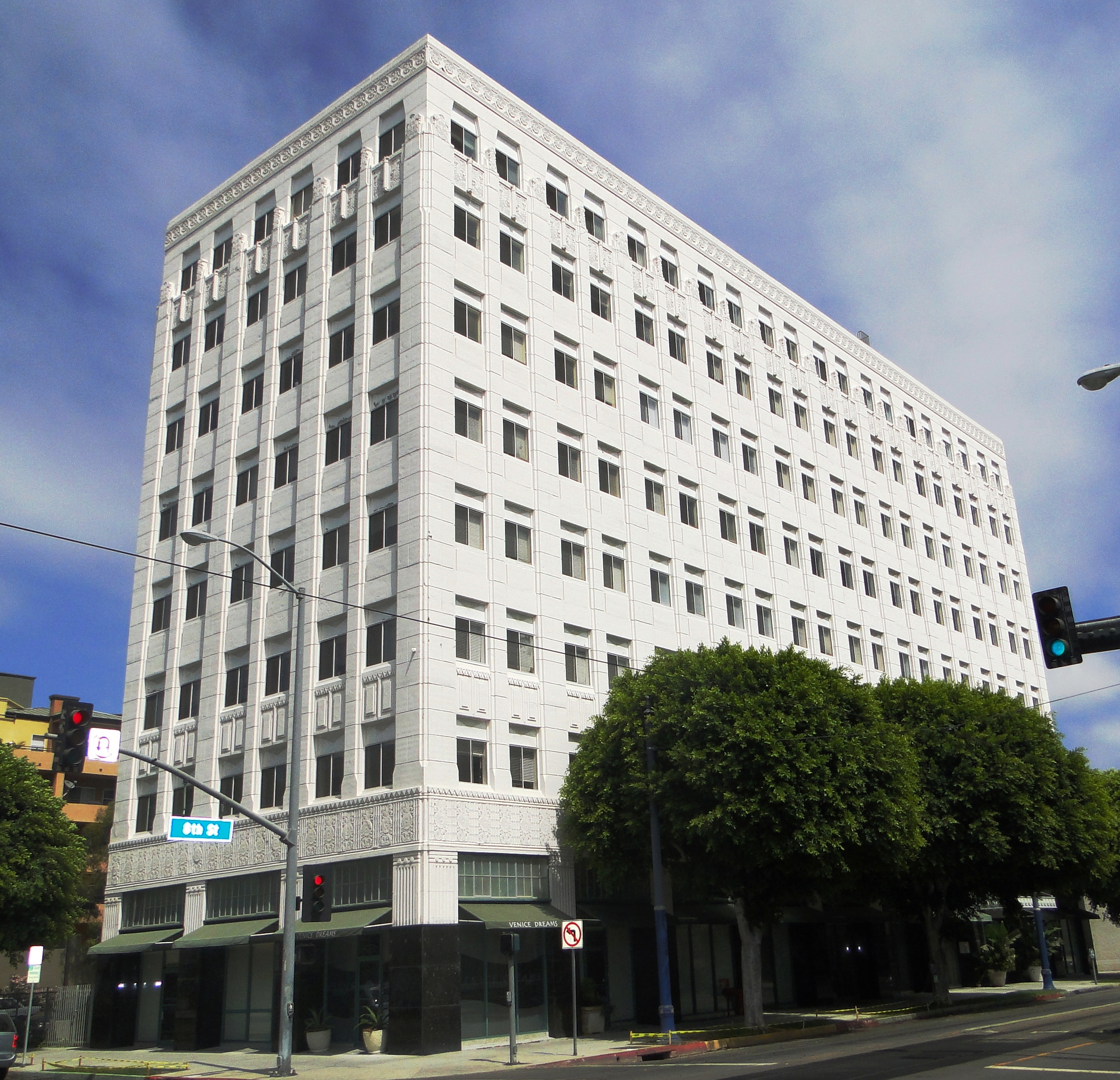

- Location within the Los Angeles metropolitan area Location within California Location within the United States
- Location: 117 E. 8th St., Long Beach, California
- Coordinates: 33°46′36″N 118°11′32″W
- Area: less than one acre
- Built: 1929
- Architect: Lee, W. Douglas
- Architectural style: Art Deco
- NRHP reference No.: 05000773
- Added to NRHP: August 3, 2005

The Long Beach Professional Building is a historic medical office building in downtown Long Beach, California added to the National Register of Historic Places in 2005.

The eight-story Art Deco two-part vertical block building with its pink and black lobby was built in 1929. It was designed by architect William Douglas Lee. It is particularly notable as the city's first large office building devoted exclusively to medicine. It is a cast-in-place concrete building.

It is also credited for introducing elements commonly found in the so-called "WPA Moderne" style of the 1930s.

In 2018, the building was re-opened by owners, Global Premier Development, and now operates under the name Regency Palms as an Assisted Living and Memory Care facility.

KTGY Architecture + Planning was responsible for the historic renovation.

== See also ==
- List of City of Long Beach Historic Landmarks
