= St. Regis Building =

- Long Beach Historic Landmark
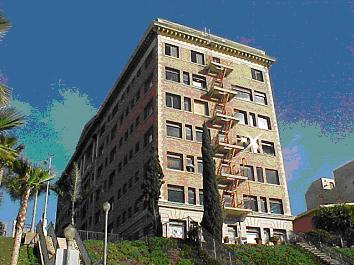
- Location: 1030 E. Ocean Blvd., Long Beach, California
- Built: 1922
- Architectural style: Renaissance Revival, Greek Revival

The St. Regis Building is a historic condominium building on Ocean Boulevard in the Alamitos Beach neighborhood of Long Beach, California. It was constructed in 1922. It has an ionic entablature rimming the seventh floor and the facade has a large triangular pediment and boxed cornice.

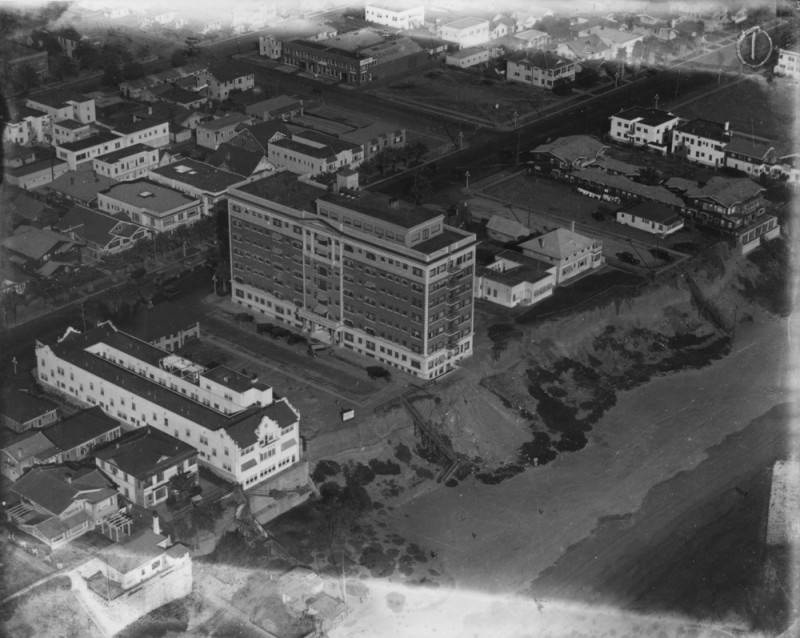
Aerial view of the St. Regis, 1922

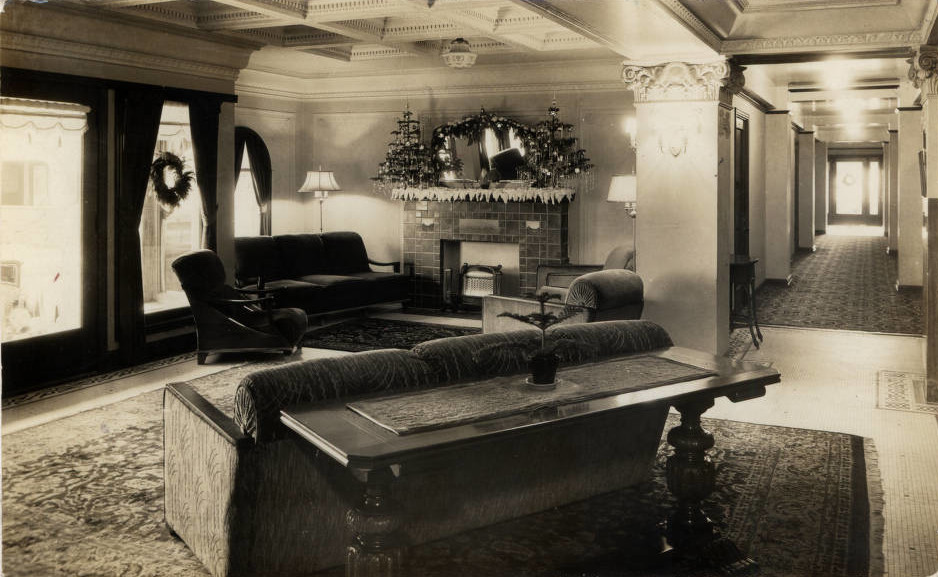
St. Regis Apartments lobby, 1922

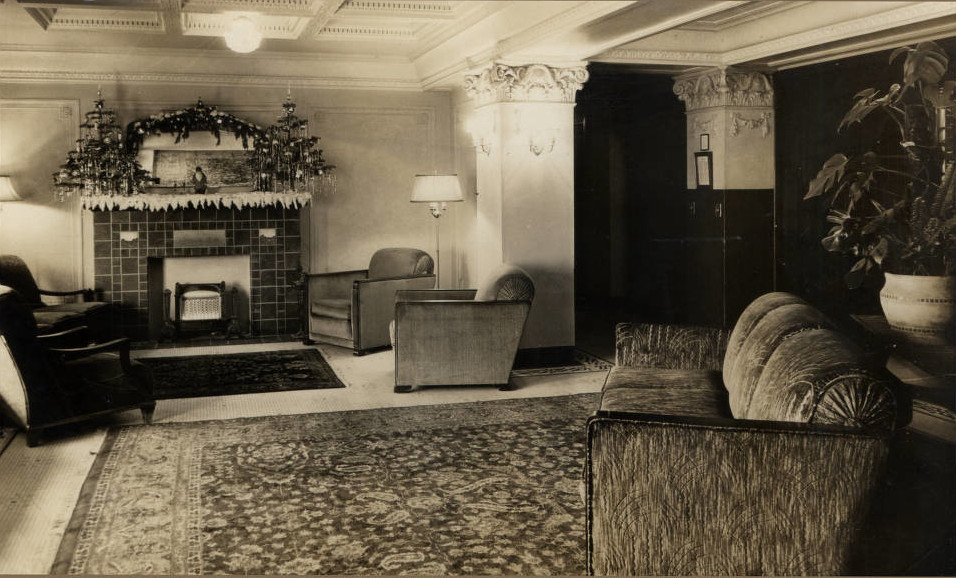
Ornate ceiling and columns, 1922

== See also ==
- List of City of Long Beach historic landmarks
