= First National Bank of Long Beach =

- U.S. National Register of Historic Places
- Long Beach Historic Landmark
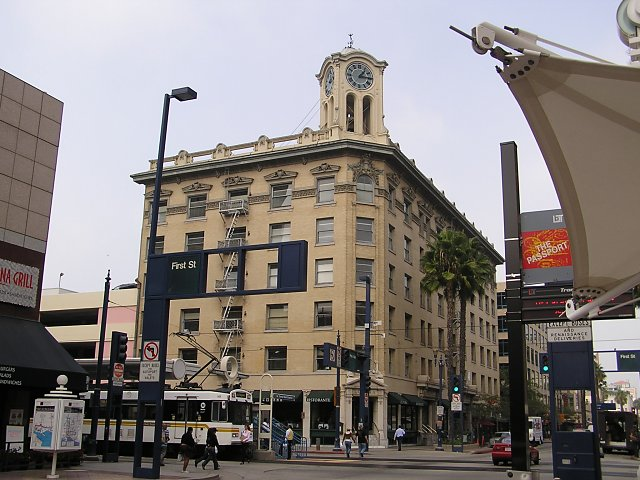
- The building in 2007

- Location within the Los Angeles metropolitan area Location within California Location within the United States
- Location: 101--125 Pine Ave
- Nearest city: Long Beach, California
- Coordinates: 33°46′06.36″N 118°11′33.39″W
- Built: 1906
- Architect: Train & Williams
- NRHP reference No.: 90001432
- Added to NRHP: September 13, 1990

First National Bank of Long Beach (also known as the Metropolitan Building and the Enloe Building) in downtown Long Beach, California is listed on the National Register of Historic Places.

The bank building originally was three stories, and was surpassed in 1906 by the current building, designed by Train and Williams. The distinctive clock tower with its six-foot-diameter clock face was added in 1907. The structure was designed in a French Renaissance Revival style utilizing pressed yellow brick on the street sides and common red brick on the remaining two sides.

A number of bank tenants have occupied the building, including (in order):

- The First National Bank of Long Beach (5456) (1906-1925)
- The California National Bank of Long Beach (11873) (1925-1929)
- California First National Bank of Long Beach (11873) (1929-1936)
- Bank of America, National Trust & Savings Association (13044) 1936 to sometime in the 1960s.

During the 1950s, many of the original decorative elements such as the decorative cornice were removed or covered as part of modernizations efforts. In the 1980s, federal tax incentives motivated a project to restore the building to its original look and to repair the clock tower. The ground floor of the building has housed L'Opera Ristorante since 1990.

The building was purchased for $10.9 million in 2014 ($14.8 million in 2025). In 2024, the owner submitted plans to convert the building into 70 residential units and also add a 3,600 square feet (330 m^{2}) rooftop deck.

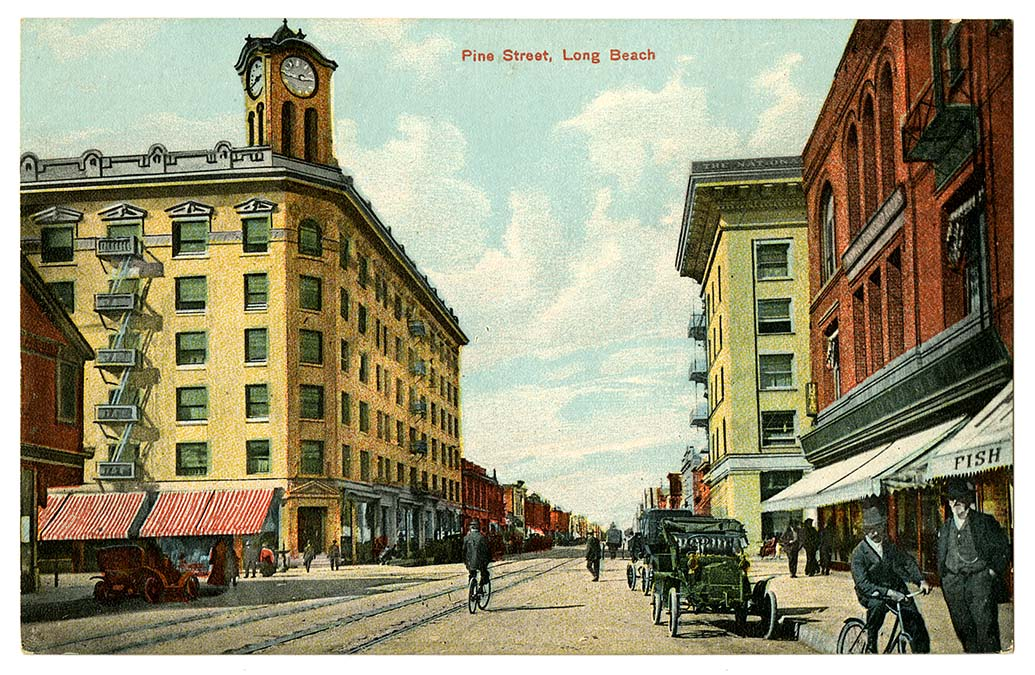
Postcard depicting Pine Street, courtesy, California Historical Society

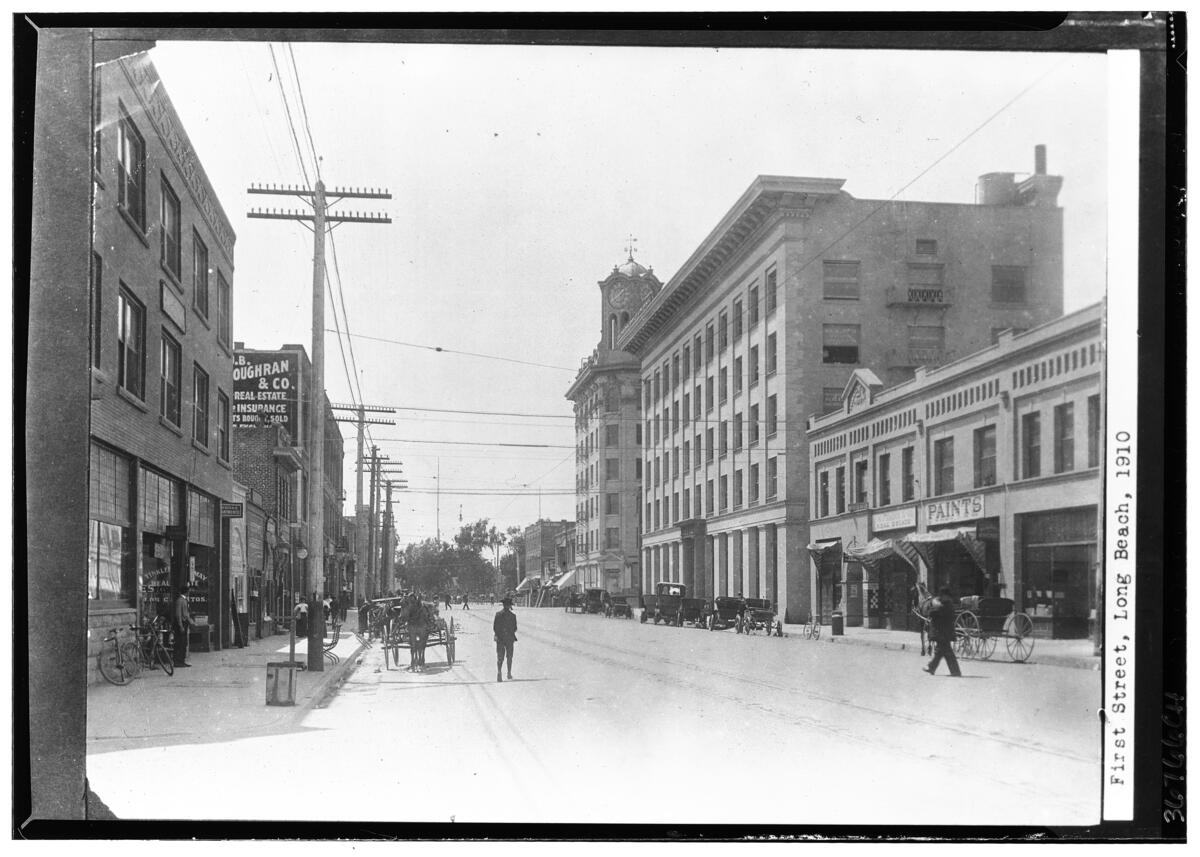
First Street and the First National Bank building in the background, 1910

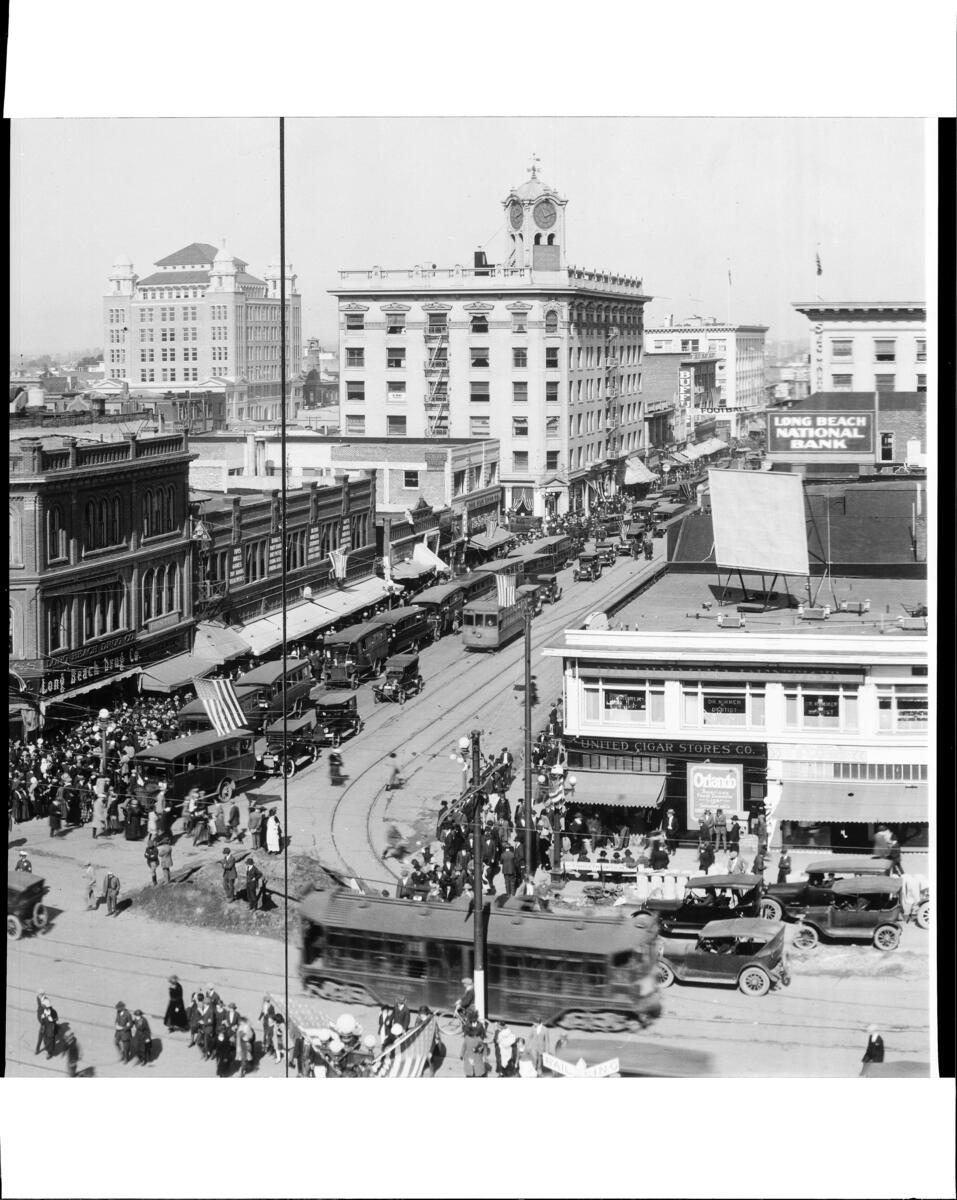
The building on Armistice Day, 1920

== See also ==
- List of City of Long Beach Historic Landmarks
