= Long Beach Main Post Office =

- U.S. Post Office-Long Beach Main
- U.S. National Register of Historic Places
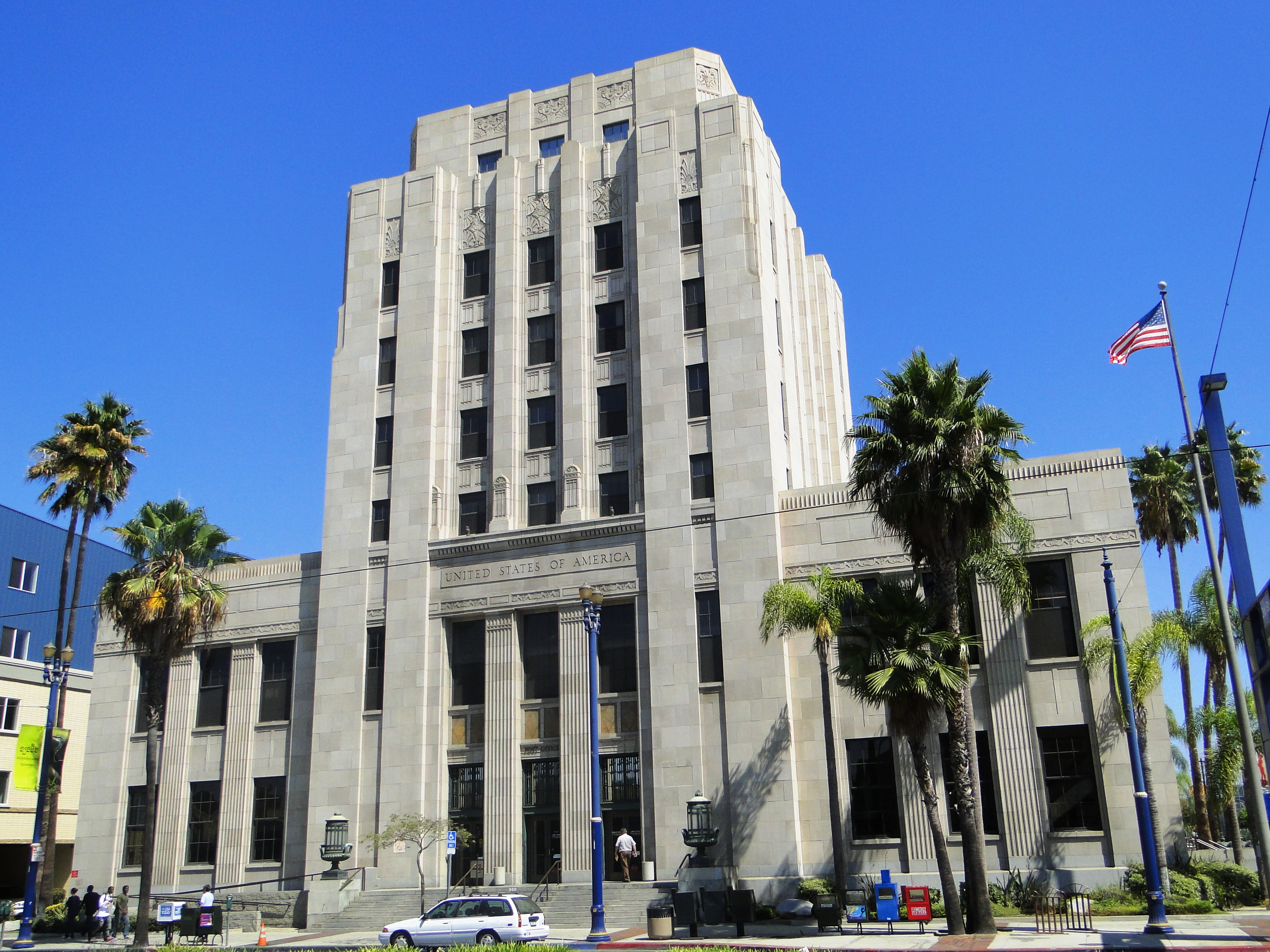
- Main Post Office in Long Beach, September 2009

- Location within the Los Angeles metropolitan area Location within California Location within the United States
- Location: 300 Long Beach Blvd., Long Beach, California
- Coordinates: 33.770838°N 118.18896°W
- Built: 1934
- Architect: Louis A. Simon and Office of the Supervising Architect under James A. Wetmore
- Architectural style: Art Deco, PWA Moderne
- NRHP reference No.: 85000129
- Added to NRHP: 1985

The Long Beach Main Post Office is a post office located on Long Beach Boulevard in downtown Long Beach, California.

The Art Deco and PWA Moderne style building opened in 1934 and was added to the National Register of Historic Places (as U.S. Post Office-Long Beach Main) due to its architectural significance in 1985. It remains in operation as a post office.

== Description ==
The structure was built from 1932 to 1934, out of large masonry blocks with terra cotta sheathing. The structure's most prominent feature is the central tower rising four-and-a-half stories from the street level. The building's design has been credited to Louis A. Simon and the Office of the Supervising Architect under James A. Wetmore. From 1933 to 1939, Simon was the head of the Office of the Supervising Architect, an agency of the United States Treasury Department that designed federal government buildings.

The building's architectural style has been described as "Starved Classicism" and "PWA Moderne". One writer has referred to the building as "Post-Quake Moderne," due to the fact that the Moderne style of Art Deco architecture was prevalent as Long Beach was rebuilt after the 1933 Long Beach earthquake. In their book, An architectural guidebook to Los Angeles, architectural historians David Gebhard and Robert Winter described the Long Beach Main Post Office as "PWA Moderne, accomplished with restrained and sophisticated taste."

== History ==
Long Beach's postal system was established in 1885, predating the city's official incorporation. The first postmaster was Col. W.W. Lowe.

The proposal for the new main post office building was officially accepted in March 1931, and the groundbreaking took place one year later in March 1932. Construction was underway when the 1933 Long Beach earthquake struck the city. Construction was halted briefly, but work resumed a week later after a survey by contractors showed little damage. The scaffolding was removed from the structure at the end of July 1934, and 5,000 persons attended the opening ceremony in September 1934. The structure has been in continuous operation as a post office since 1934.

== Gallery ==
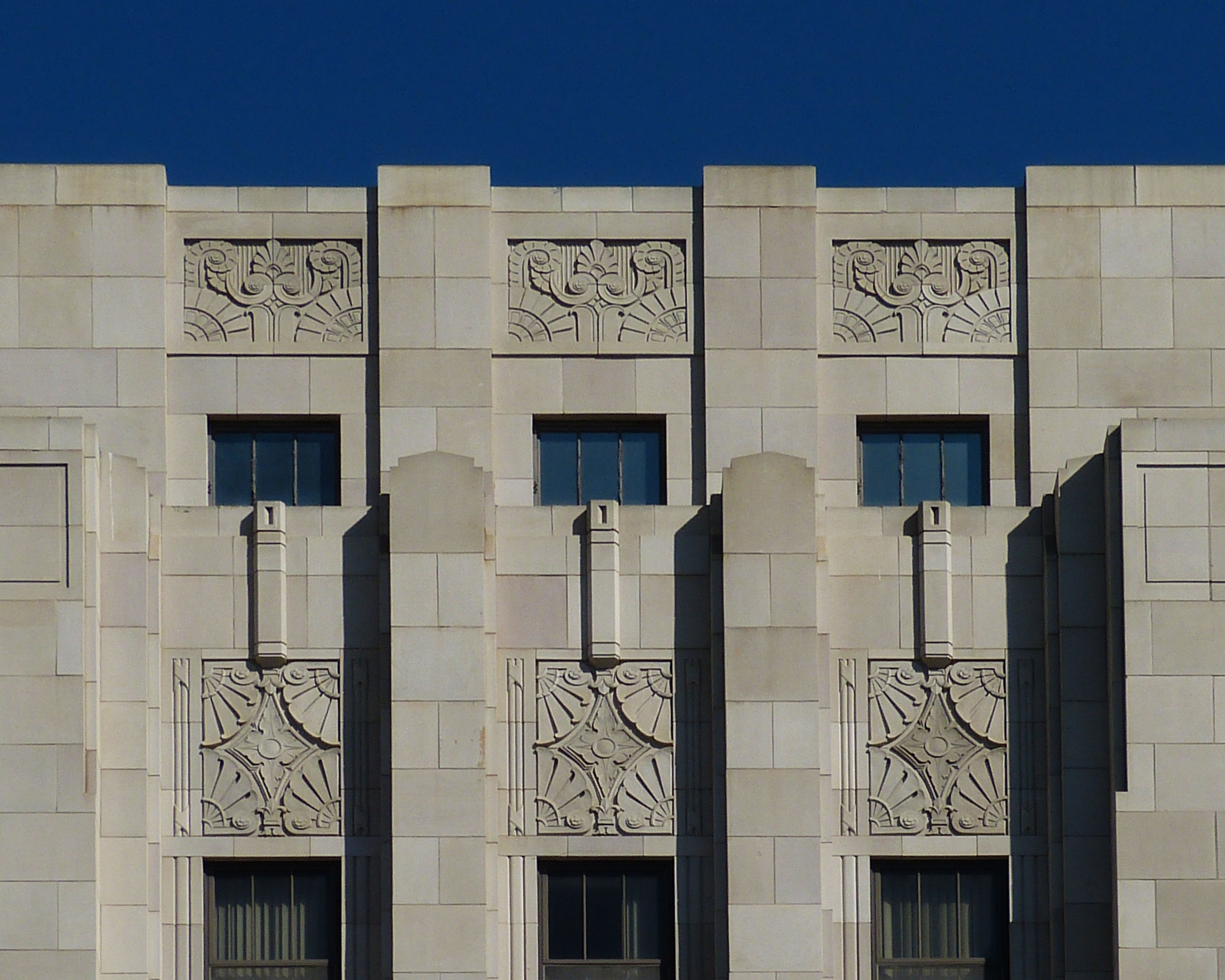
Reliefs

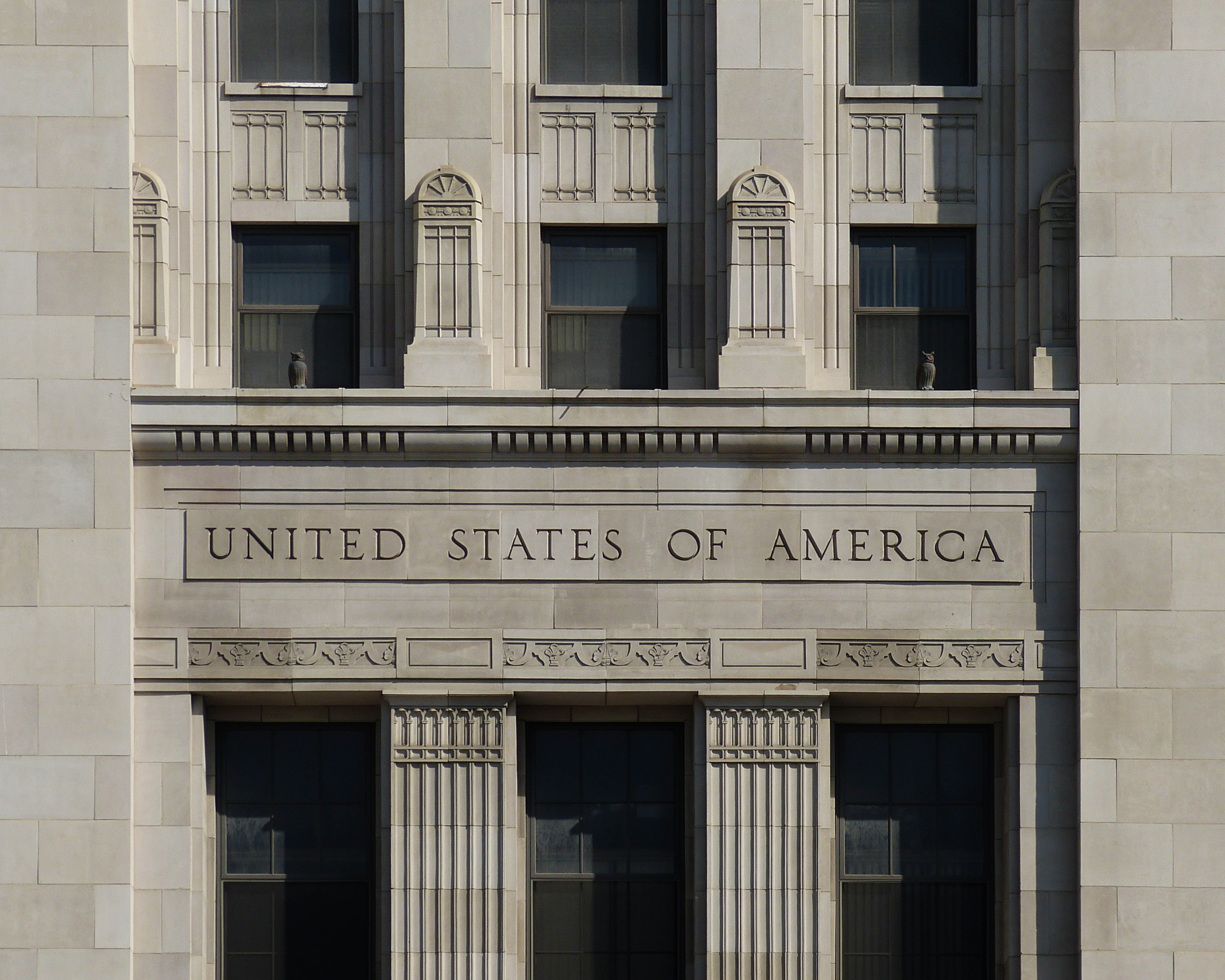
Engraving

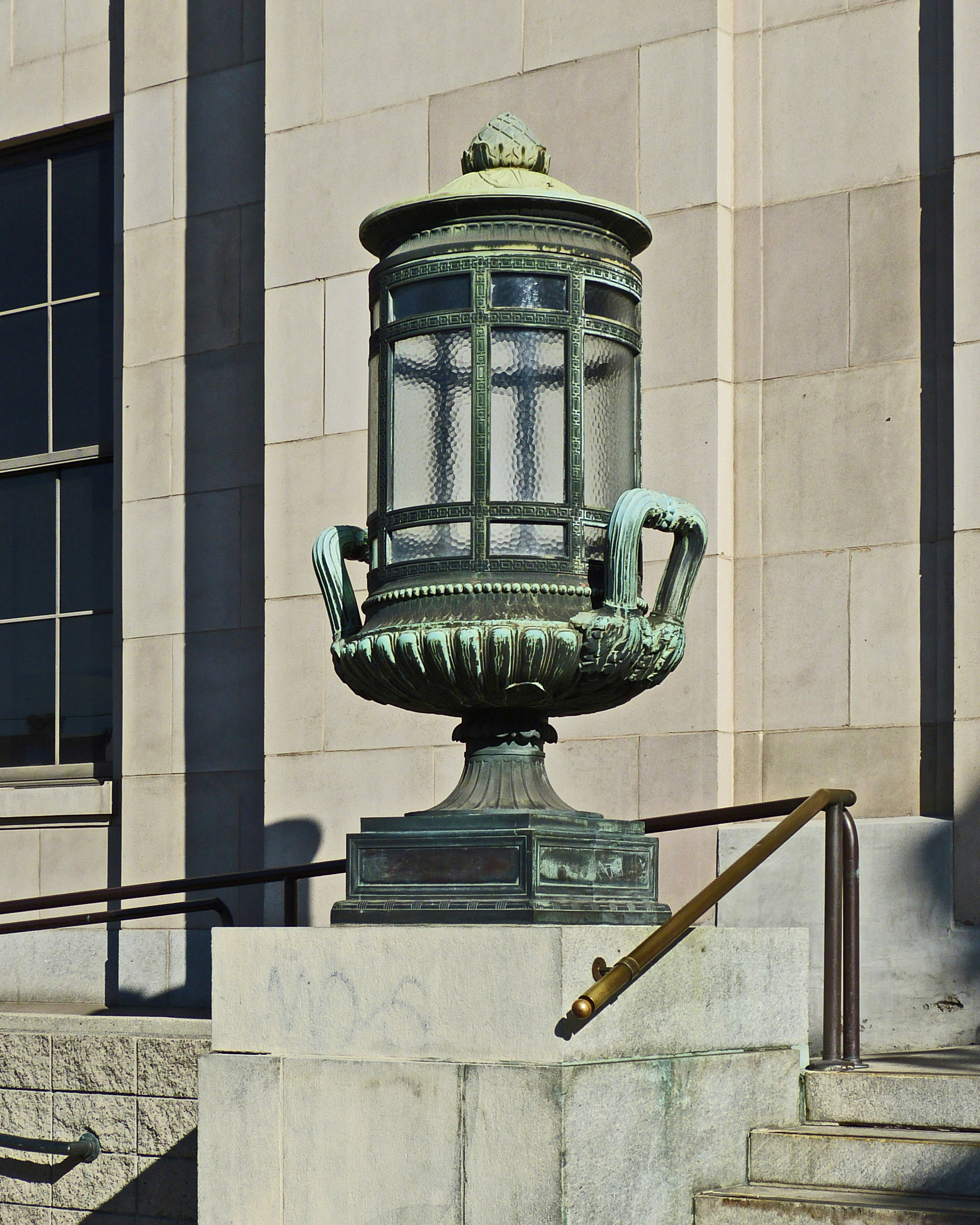
Fixture

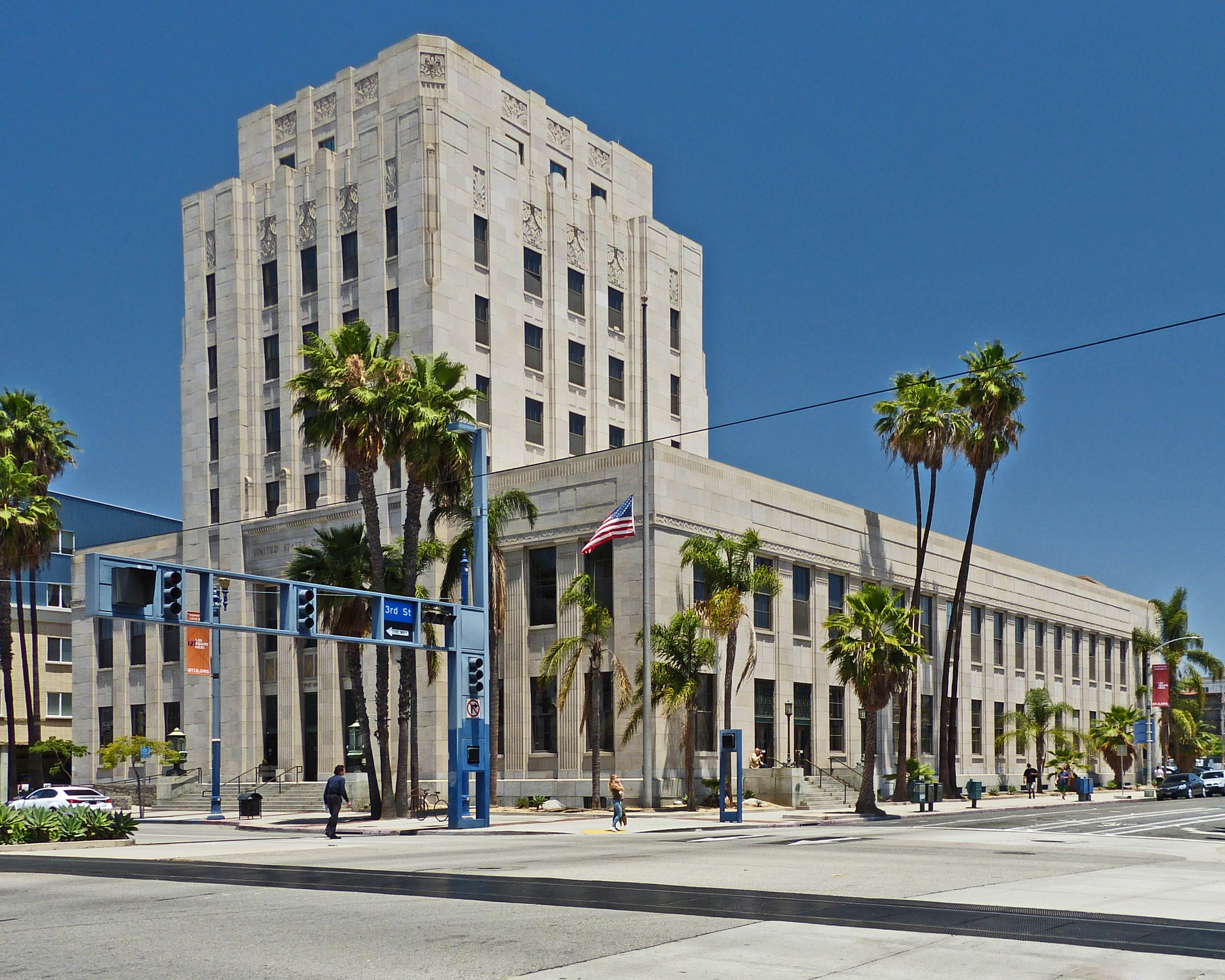
View from 3rd Street

== See also ==
- List of City of Long Beach historic landmarks
- National Register of Historic Places listings in Los Angeles County, California
- List of United States post offices
