= Scottish Rite Cathedral (Long Beach, California) =

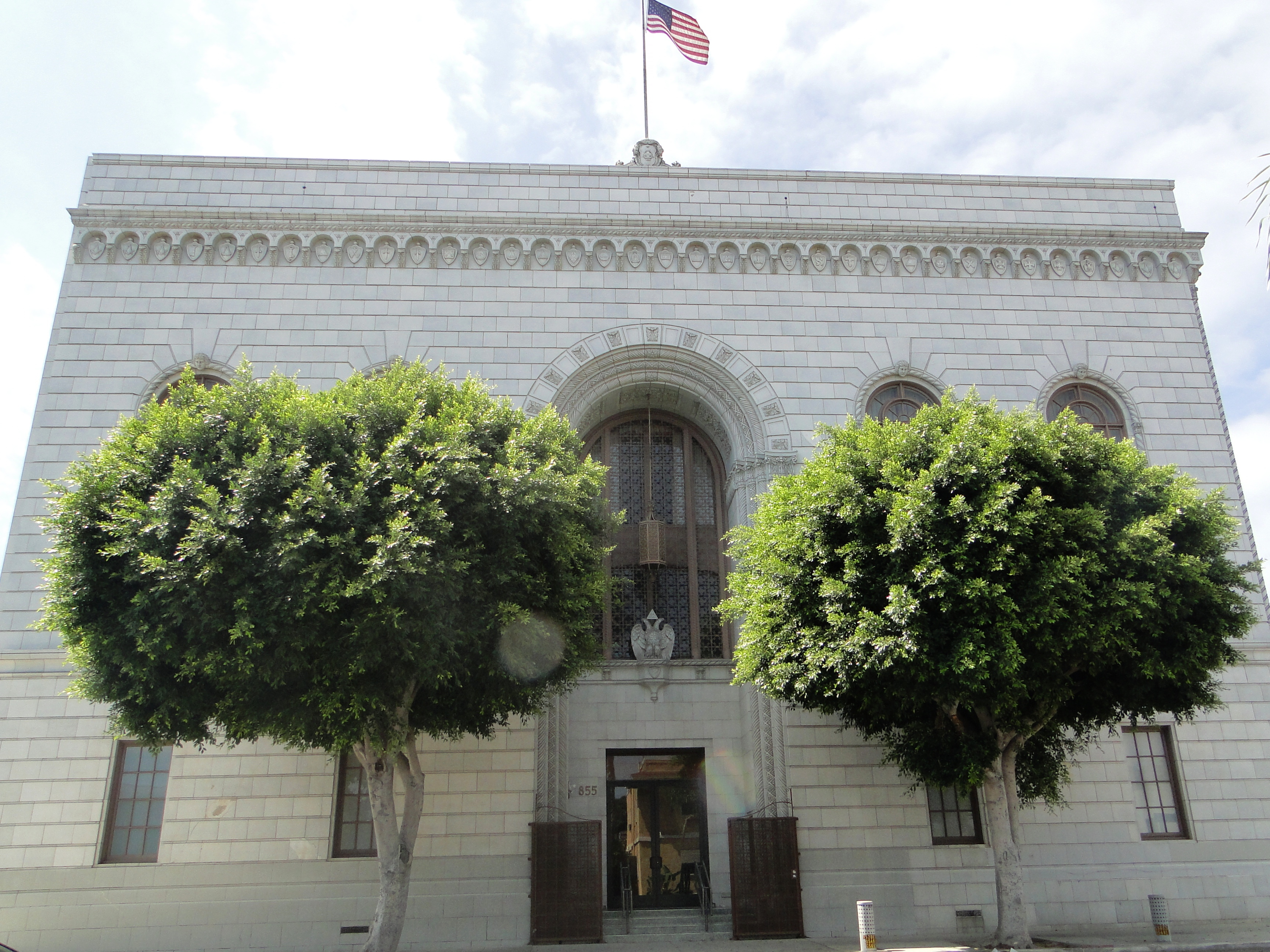
- Scottish Rite Cathedral, September 2009

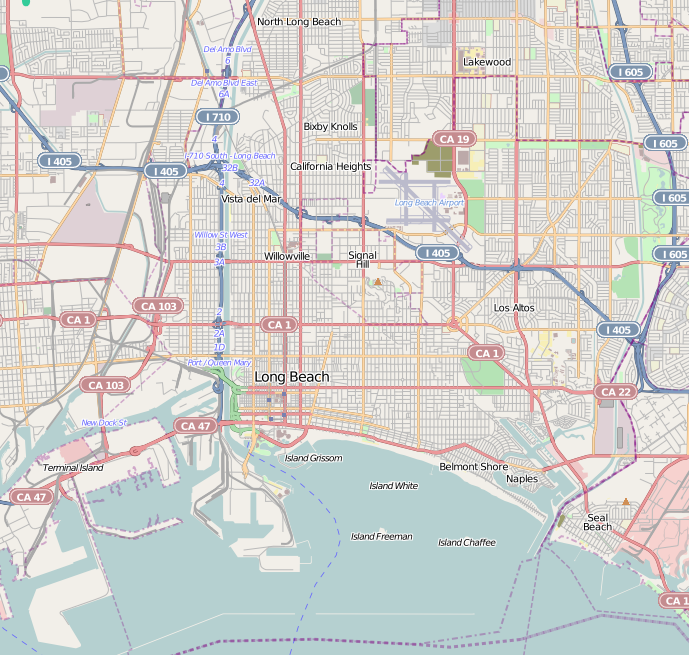
- Location in Long Beach
- 33°46′39″N 118°11′17″W
- Location: 855 Elm Ave., Long Beach, California

History
- Built: 1926

Site notes
- Architect(s): Wright & Gentry (Parker O. Wright)
- Architectural style: Romanesque Revival
- Governing body: Private
- Website: https://www.lbscottishrite.org/

Long Beach Historic Landmark

Scottish Rite Cathedral in Long Beach, California, is a Long Beach Historic Landmark. It is a five-story Romanesque Revival structure built for the local Scottish Rite branch of Freemasonry. It was declared a historic landmark in 1980.

== Description ==
The five-story Romanesque Revival building was built for use in the Scottish Rite branch of Freemasonry. It was built from 1925 to 1926 from steel frame and reinforced concrete with exterior granite terra cotta. Architects Wright & Gentry prepared the drawings for the building as well as the Long Beach York Rite Temple. The general contractor on the project was W.E. Campbell.

The building's auditorium has a 30-foot-high ceiling with hand-painted designs. The stage measures 27 feet across the front curtain area and is 40 feet deep. It is used for theatrical performances, weddings, and other events. There is seating for 800.

== History ==
The groundbreaking for the building was in July 1925. The skeleton of steel, weighing approximately 500 tons, was installed in just 27 days. Some 250 tons of ornamental terra cotta purchased from the Los Angeles Pressed Brick Company were also used on the structure. Architect Parker O. Wright described the choice of materials as follows: "Steel was selected because buildings of this type are more enduring and more nearly earthquake proof than those of any other material."

The cathedral was dedicated in September 1926 in a three-day ceremony during which several hundred individuals were invested with various degrees of Masonry. At the time of its opening, the Los Angeles Times called it "one of the most beautiful structures of its kind in the West." The total cost of the building with furnishings was estimated to be $500,000.

In 1980, the building became the eighth structure to be designated as a Long Beach Historic Landmark. At the time, the Los Angeles Times referred to it as an "enormous" building with an "imposing facade" and an "elaborately decorated main auditorium."

== See also ==
- Masonic Temple (Long Beach, California)
- List of City of Long Beach Historic Landmarks
