= St. John's Missionary Baptist Church =

Historic church in North Carolina, United States

- U.S. National Register of Historic Places
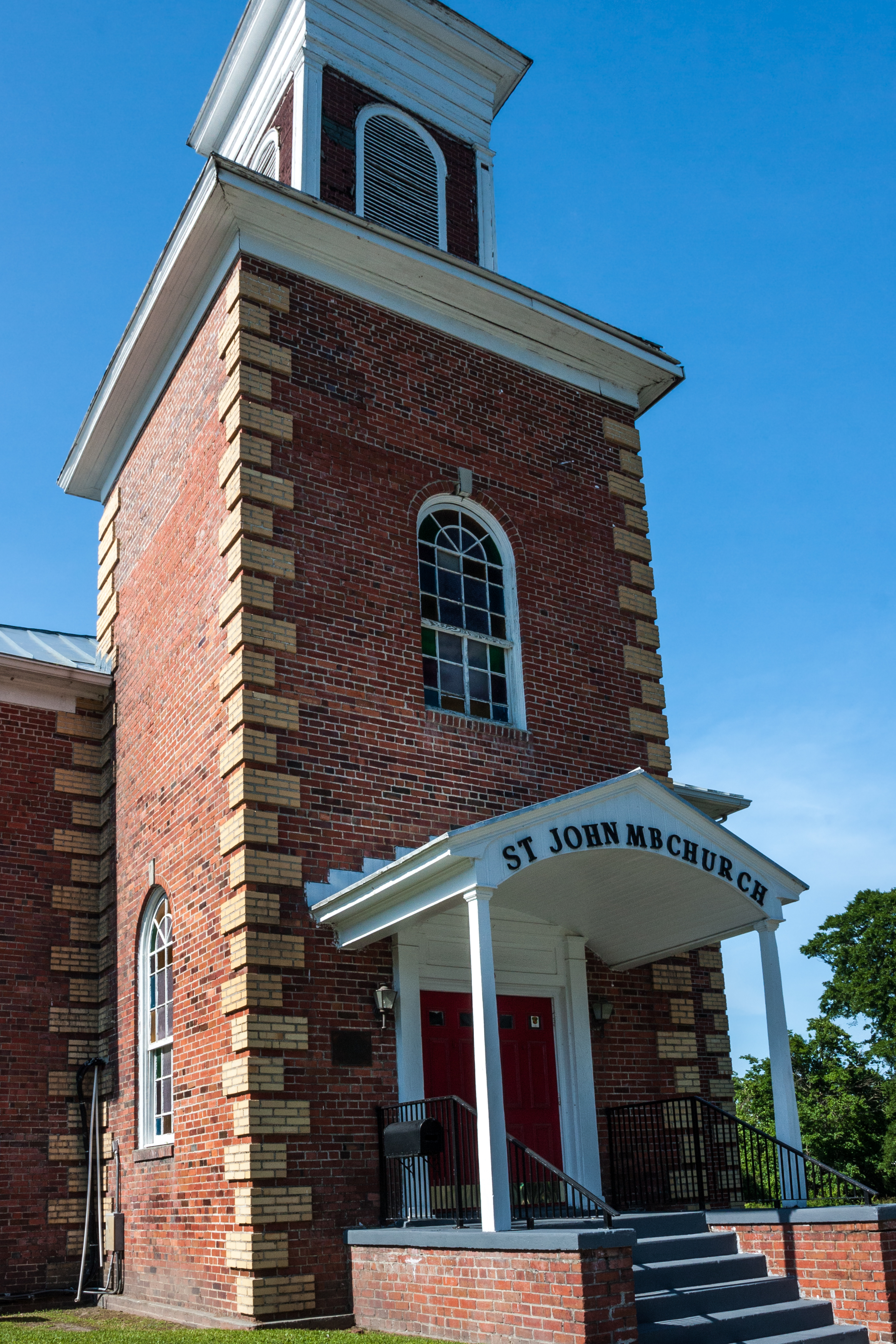

- Location within North Carolina Location within the United States
- Location: 1130 Walt Bellamy Dr., New Bern, North Carolina
- Coordinates: 35°6′16″N 77°3′12″W
- Area: less than one acre
- Built: 1926
- Architect: Perry, Mr.
- Architectural style: Classical Revival
- MPS: Historic African American Churches in Craven County MPS
- NRHP reference No.: 97000575
- Added to NRHP: June 30, 1997

St. John's Missionary Baptist Church is a historic African-American Baptist church at 1130 Walt Bellamy Drive in New Bern, Craven County, North Carolina, United States. It was built in 1926, and is a rectangular brick church building on a raised basement in the Classical Revival style. It features a three-stage central entrance tower. It is believed to be the oldest black Baptist congregation in New Bern.

It was listed on the National Register of Historic Places in 1997.
