= Adelaide Tichenor =

Civic leader and philanthropist (1845–1924)

Adelaide M. Tichenor
- Born: Adelaide Alexander; October 9, 1845; Ravenna, Ohio, U.S.
- Died: May 10, 1924 (aged 78); Long Beach, California, U.S.
- Spouse: Lester Tichenor (m. 1885)

Adelaide M. Tichenor (1845–1924) was a civic leader in Long Beach, California. She was the founder and first president of the Ebell of Long Beach. She is best known for donating her estate to establish the Tichenor Clinic for Children, fulfilling her desire to provide care to children with chronic orthopedic disabilities, regardless of their ability to pay.

== Biography ==
Tichenor was born in Ravenna, Ohio. Tichenor received her degree from Oberlin College and went on to study at St. Louis Normal College (in Missouri) and Massachusetts Normal Art School. She worked as a teacher in Boston and St. Louis before moving to Redlands, California to take a teaching job in 1878. In 1895 she moved to Long Beach after a period of traveling. She remained there for the remainder of her life, working on the management of properties in the area.

Tichenor founded the Ebell club on November 16, 1896; the club was intended as a women's club to be centered on improving conditions in the area. Tichenor was later president of the Ebell club when they built a new club house in 1905, and she laid the ceremonial cornerstone with a box of items commemorating the event.

Tichenor was recognized at different points for her civic contributions, which included helping to establish the local library and the YWCA. When she learned of a need for a nursery, she donated land and building that became The Day Nursery through a donation of land and a building. While the donation was initially anonymous, as the documentation was completed her name became known and she met with the organization to share her reasons for supporting the project.

Starting in 1920, Tichenor set the stage for a institution to serve as a place to care for children with medical conditions.

Tichenor died on May 10, 1924. Following her death, the newspapers expanded upon the charitable contributions detailed within her will.

== Personal life ==
Tichenor married Lester Schuyler Tichenor in 1885, who died in 1892. Her house in Long Beach, known as the Adelaide M. Tichenor house, was designed in 1904 by the architectural firm Greene and Greene.
