= Bixby family =

California real estate family

The Bixby family is an American family that was heavily involved in the development of California ranches and real estate in the 19th and 20th centuries. Through various companies, they controlled at one time or another large swathes of California real estate, much of it derived from Mexican land grants. Over several generations, their holdings included Rancho Los Cerritos and Rancho Los Alamitos, and parts of Rancho San Justo and Rancho Palos Verdes, totaling well over 100,000 acres. Parts of the towns of Long Beach, Bellflower, Paramount, Signal Hill, Lakewood, and Los Alamitos emerged from former Bixby-held lands. Within Long Beach, the neighborhoods Bixby Hill, Bixby Knolls, and Bixby Village are named after the family, as well as Bixby Park in the Alamitos Beach neighborhood.

The key members of the family connected to California real estate are the brothers Llewellyn and Jotham Bixby, their first cousins Thomas and Benjamin Flint, and a cousin of the next generation, John William Bixby. Llewellyn's daughter Sarah Bixby Smith wrote a well-known memoir of growing up on the Bixby family ranches in the late 19th century; her second husband, Paul Jordan-Smith, was also a writer. Jotham's daughter Fanny Bixby Spencer was a philanthropist and anti-war activist who was also one of the nation's earliest policewomen.

Jotham and Margaret Bixby founded the First Congregational Church in 1888 and later contributed to the construction of the 1914 building.

== Bixby genealogy ==
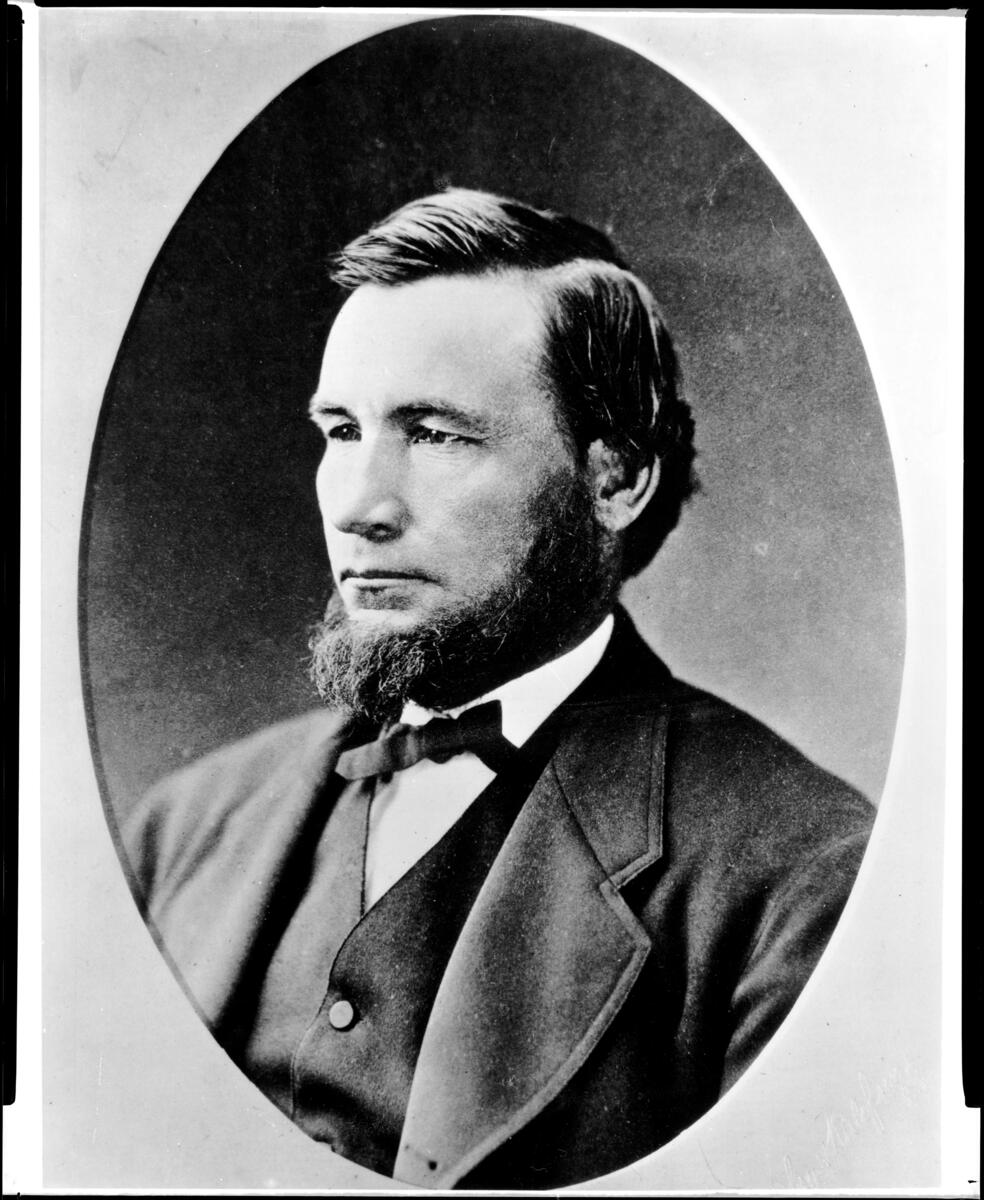
Jotham Bixby

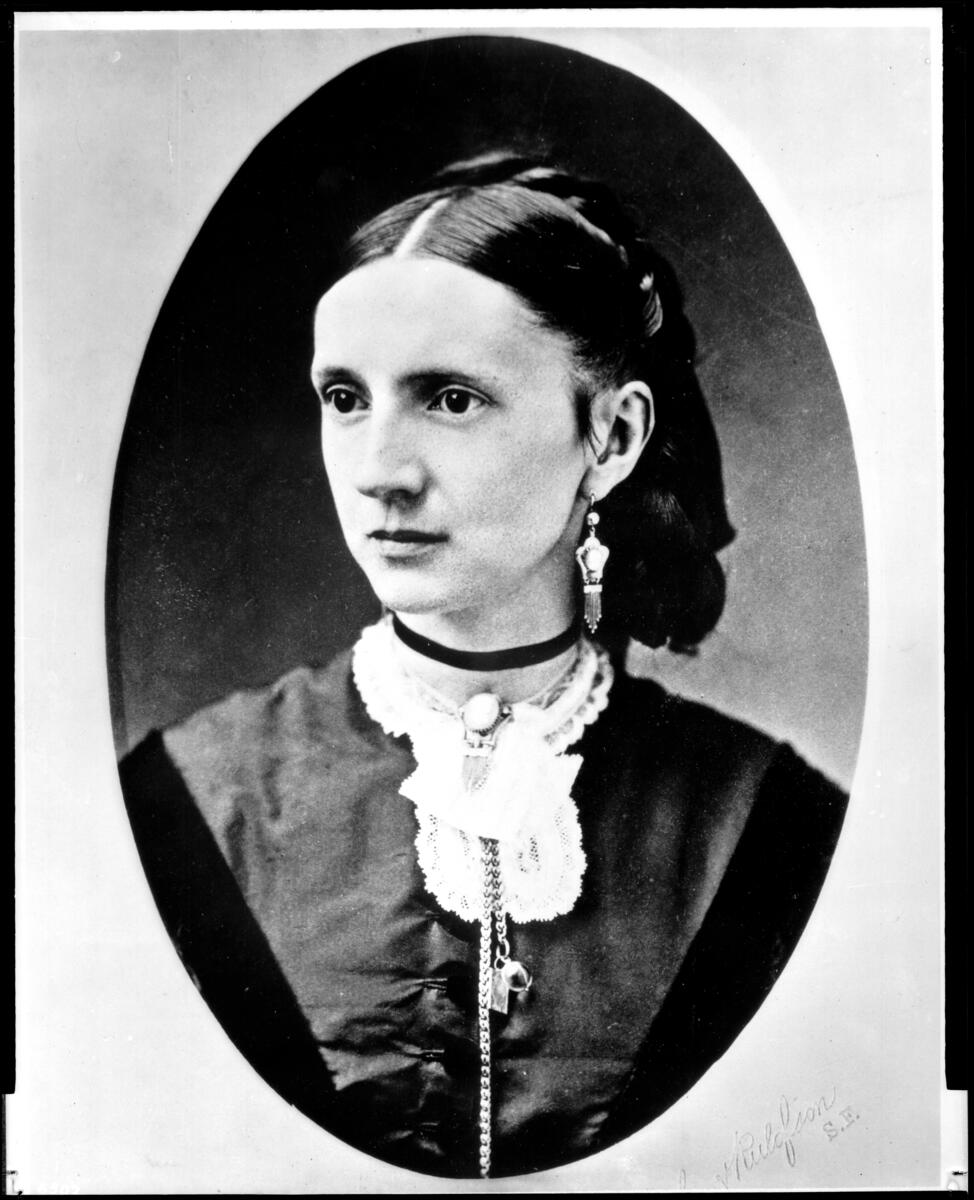
Margaret Winslow Hathaway (Mrs. Jotham Bixby)

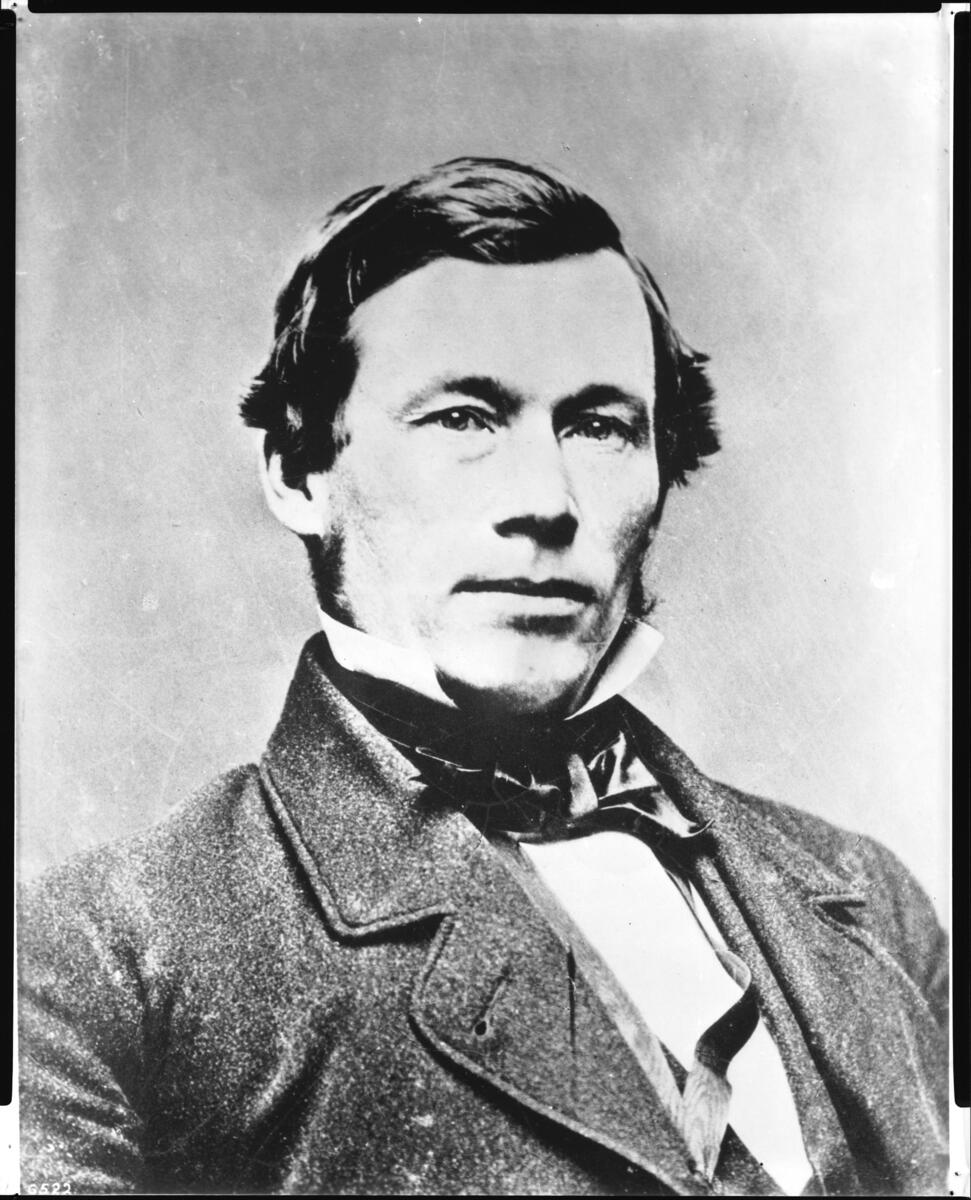
Llewellyn Bixby

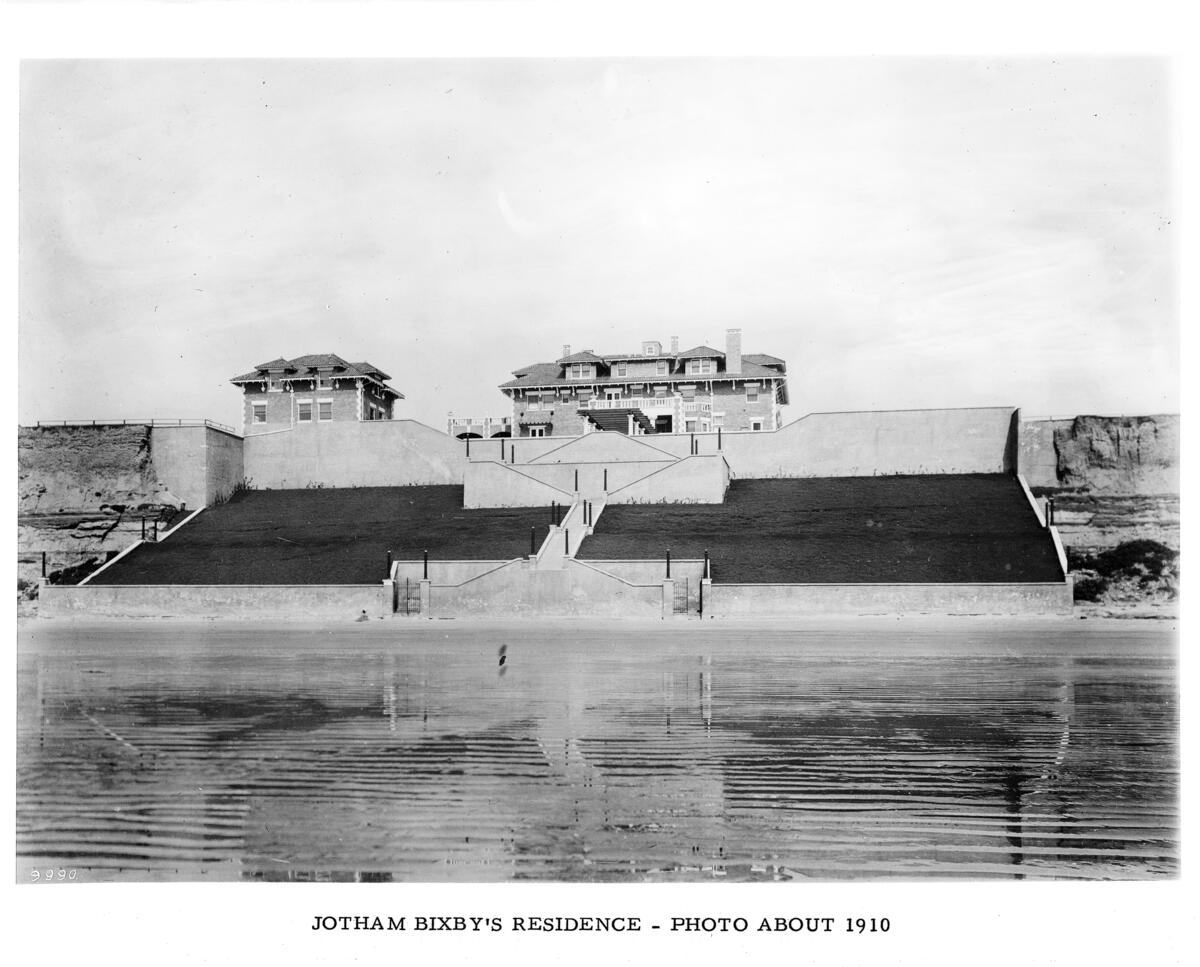
Bixby seaside residence

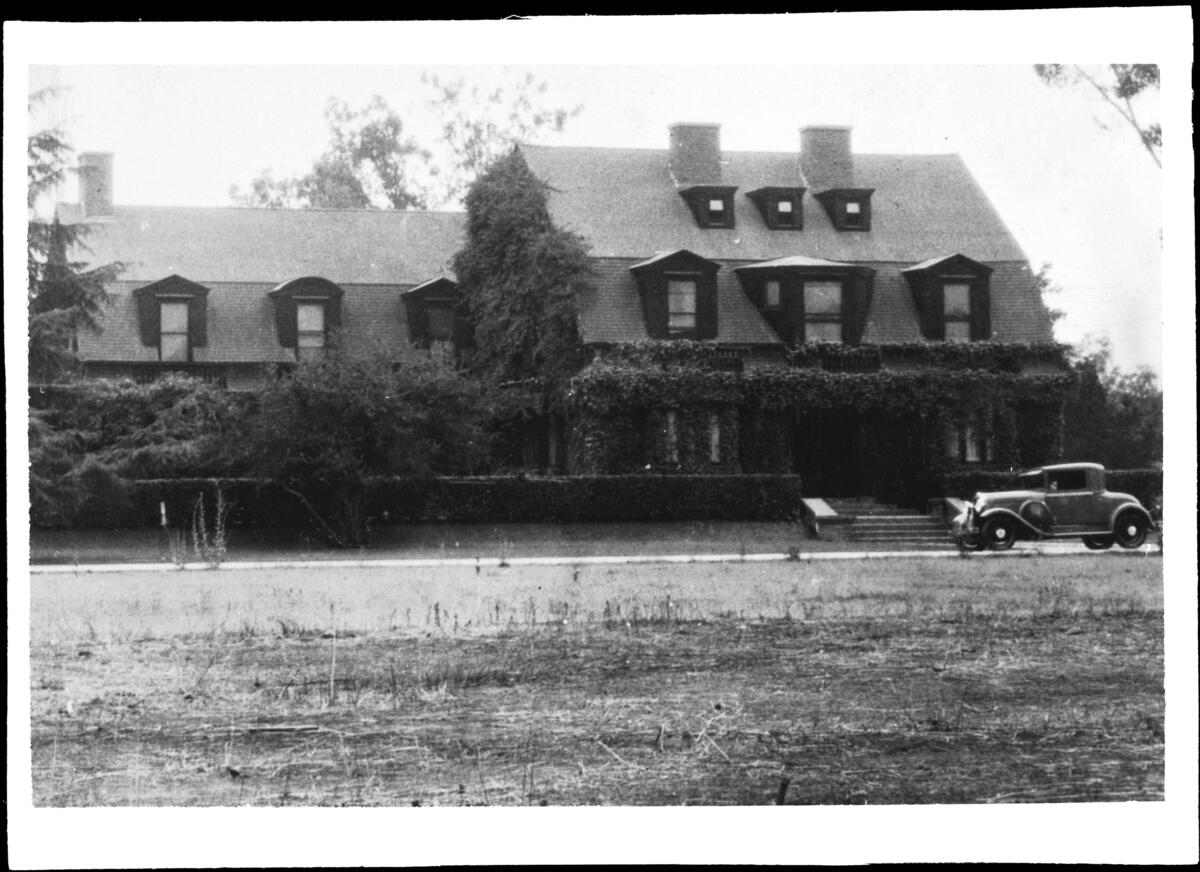
Bixby ranch house in Los Cerritos

(1) Joseph Bixby (1620-1701) born in Suffolk, England, emigrated to Boxford, Mass. before 1638; m. Sarah Herde [9 children]

(13) Benjamin Bixby (1650-1727) born in Ipswitch, Mass.; m. Mary -- [3 children]; m. Mary -- [8 children]

(134) Samuel Bixby (1689-1741) born in Topsfield, Mass.; m. Martha Underwood [8 children]

(1343) Samuel Bixby (1721-1809) born in Sutton, Mass.; m. Lydia Bond [11 children]

(13436) Solomon Bixby (1761-1835) born in Sutton, Mass.; m. Lucy Taylor [12 children]

(134363) Amasa Bixby (1794-1872) born in Norridgewock, Maine; m. Fanny Weston (1794?-1869); [13 children]

    - Llewellyn Bixby (1825-96) m. Mary Hathaway [3 children]
      - Sarah Hathaway Bixby (b. 1871) m. Paul Jordan-Smith
    - Jotham Bixby (1831-1917) m. Margaret Winslow Hathaway [7 children]
      - Fanny Weston Bixby (1879-1930) m. William Carl Spencer (1871-1950)

(134368) Simon Bixby (1803-1862) born in Norridgewock, Maine; m. Deborah Norton Flint (1806-76) [10 children]

    - John William Bixby (b. 1848) m. Susan P. Hathaway (d. 1906; sister of Margaret Winslow Hathaway)

== See also ==
- Bixby land companies
- Los Cerritos Ranch House
- Bixby Slough
- Bixby Marshland
