= California Heights, Long Beach, California =

California Heights
- Neighborhood of Long Beach
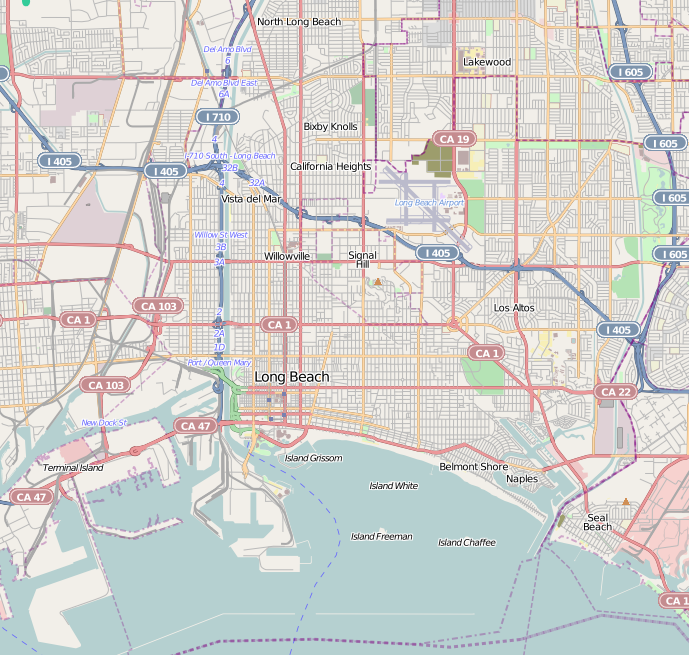
- Location within Long Beach, California Location within the Los Angeles metropolitan area Location within southern California Location within California Location within the United States
- Coordinates: 33.8222°N 118.1764°W
- Country: United States
- State: California
- County: Los Angeles
- City: Long Beach
- ZIP Code: 90807

California Heights is a historic neighborhood of Long Beach, California.

== Location ==
California Heights is located north of Signal Hill, east of Los Cerritos, south of North Long Beach and Bixby Knolls, and west of Long Beach Airport. Shops and restaurants are conveniently located on Atlantic Avenue, which runs through the district.

The western sections of California Heights and Bixby Knolls are informally known as Château-Thierry. The borders of Château-Thierry are San Antonio Dr., Atlantic Ave., Wardlow Rd. and Long Beach Blvd. This tract was owned by the family of Earl S. Daugherty. In 1919, Earl Daugherty developed the 20-acre Château-Thierry Airfield on that tract, named in honor of the recent Battle of Château-Thierry. The later housing development took the same name.

== Description ==
Until the early 1920s California Heights was part of the Bixby Ranch (now Rancho Los Cerritos) and was used primarily as grazing land. It was the discovery of oil on Signal Hill and the ensuing land boom in 1921 that caused the Jotham Bixby Company to subdivide and sell off lots in the California Heights tract.

In 1927, California Heights petitioned the City of Long Beach for paved streets, sidewalks, curbs and ornamental lighting.

The California Heights-Chateau Thierry area grew rapidly, with approximately 250 families moving into the neighborhood between 1925 and 1927. The area continued to attract new families, and by 1939 most of the building was complete.

== Architecture ==
California Heights has been designated a historic district by local ordinance since 1990. Modification to any house in the district requires a Certificate of Appropriateness.

The district consists of approximately 1,500 homes. The predominant architectural style is Spanish Colonial Revival. Craftsman bungalows and Tudor Revival styles can also be found.

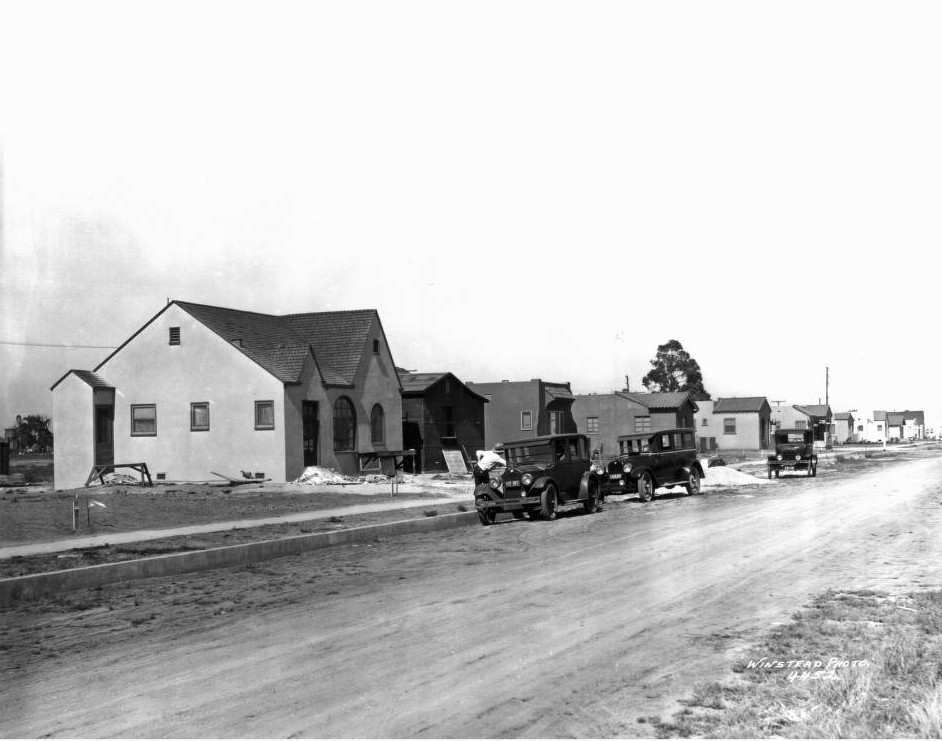
Construction in California Heights, 1927

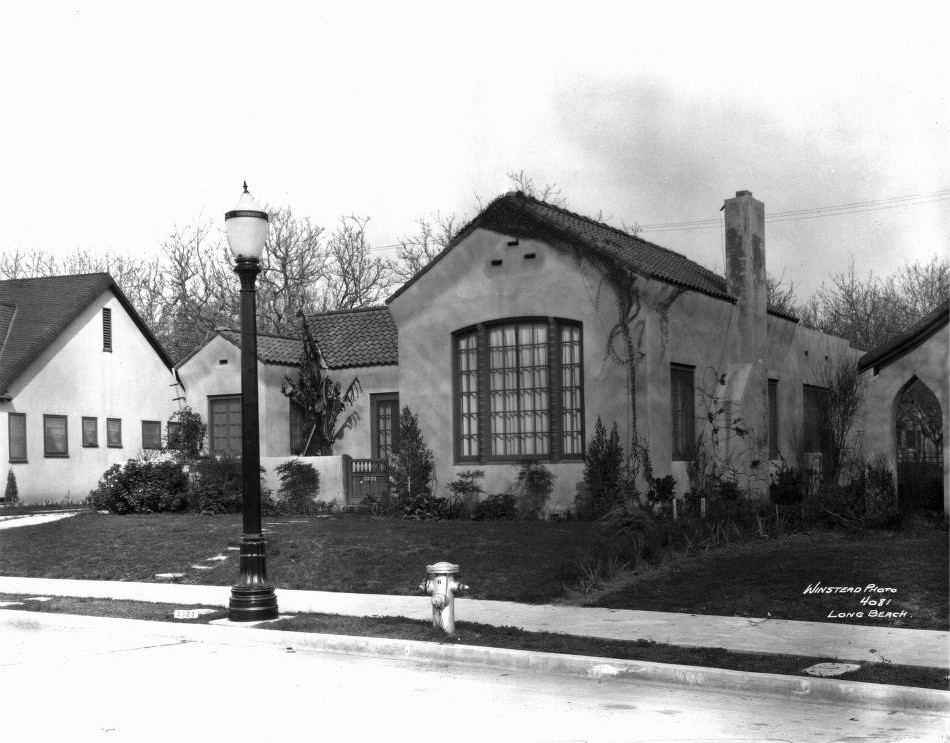
Spanish colonial house in California Heights, 1927

== See also ==
- Neighborhoods of Long Beach, California
