= Bixby Knolls, Long Beach, California =

Coordinates: 33.8356°N 118.1767°W

Bixby Knolls, California
- Neighborhood of Long Beach
- Nickname: Bixby
- Interactive map of Bixby Knolls, California
- Country: United States
- State: California
- County: Los Angeles
- City: Long Beach
- ZIP Code prefix: 90807
- Area code: 562

Bixby Knolls is a neighborhood in Long Beach, California, named after the Bixby family.

== Location ==
Bixby Knolls is an area of Long Beach adjoining North Long Beach to the north, California Heights on the southeast, Wrigley on the southwest. Its approximate boundaries are the 405 Freeway to the south (or Wardlow Avenue), Del Amo Blvd to the north (or the Southern Pacific railroad tracks), the Los Angeles River and the Lakewood city boundary to the west of Atlantic Avenue, south of Bixby Road. Atlantic Avenue and Long Beach Boulevard are the main north–south arteries through the neighborhood. The neighborhood includes the Los Cerritos - Virginia Country Club and the original Los Cerritos Ranch House historic site.

== Description ==
The majority of the homes in the area were custom-built between 1920 and 1940, providing a variety of home architecture. Small shops and restaurants dot a strip of Atlantic Avenue south of San Antonio and north of the 405 Freeway, as well as on the streets surrounding this main thoroughfare. The neighborhood is also served by several nearby grocery stores and shopping centers.

Bixby Knolls has an active local community. The Helen Borgers Theater, home to the Long Beach Shakespeare Company, and the Historical Society of Long Beach, are housed on Atlantic Avenue, just north of Carson Street. On the west side of the neighborhood, adjacent to the Los Angeles River, is the large Virginia Country Club, which is also the location of the Rancho Los Cerritos historic site.

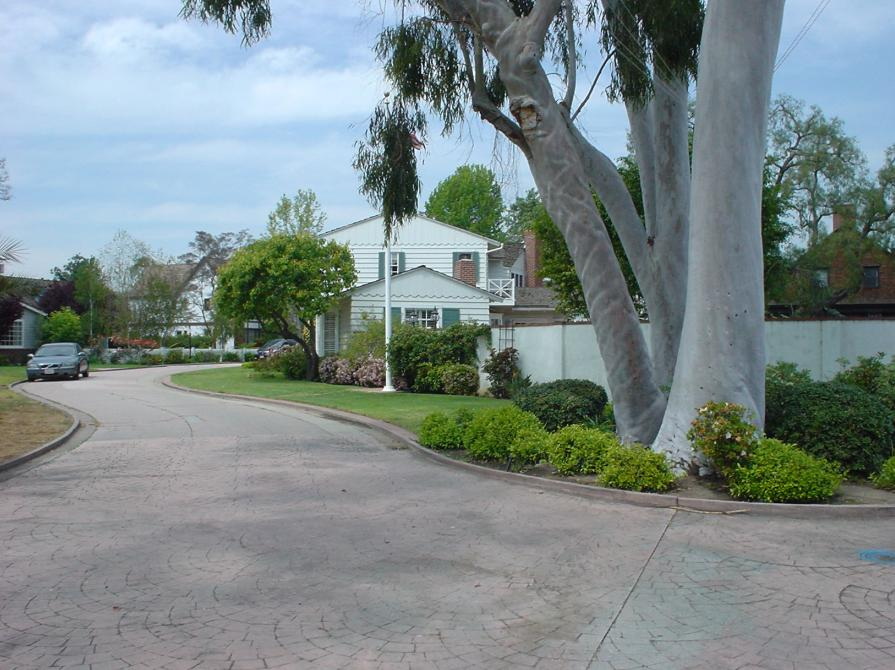
La Linda Drive looking North West from the entrance.

== Schools ==
The Long Beach Unified School District serves Bixby Knolls.

Bixby Knolls area public schools include Longfellow Elementary School, Los Cerritos Elementary School, Burroughs Elementary School. and Hughes Middle School. Several private schools are also in the area including St. Barnabas School.

For high school, the home school is Long Beach Polytechnic High School, but students can apply to any eligible program in the Long Beach Unified School District.

== Parks ==
The Bixby Knolls Park is in the area. Other parks include Los Cerritos Park in the Los Cerritos neighborhood and Somerset Park in the Bixby Terrace neighborhood.

== Historical places and notable architecture ==
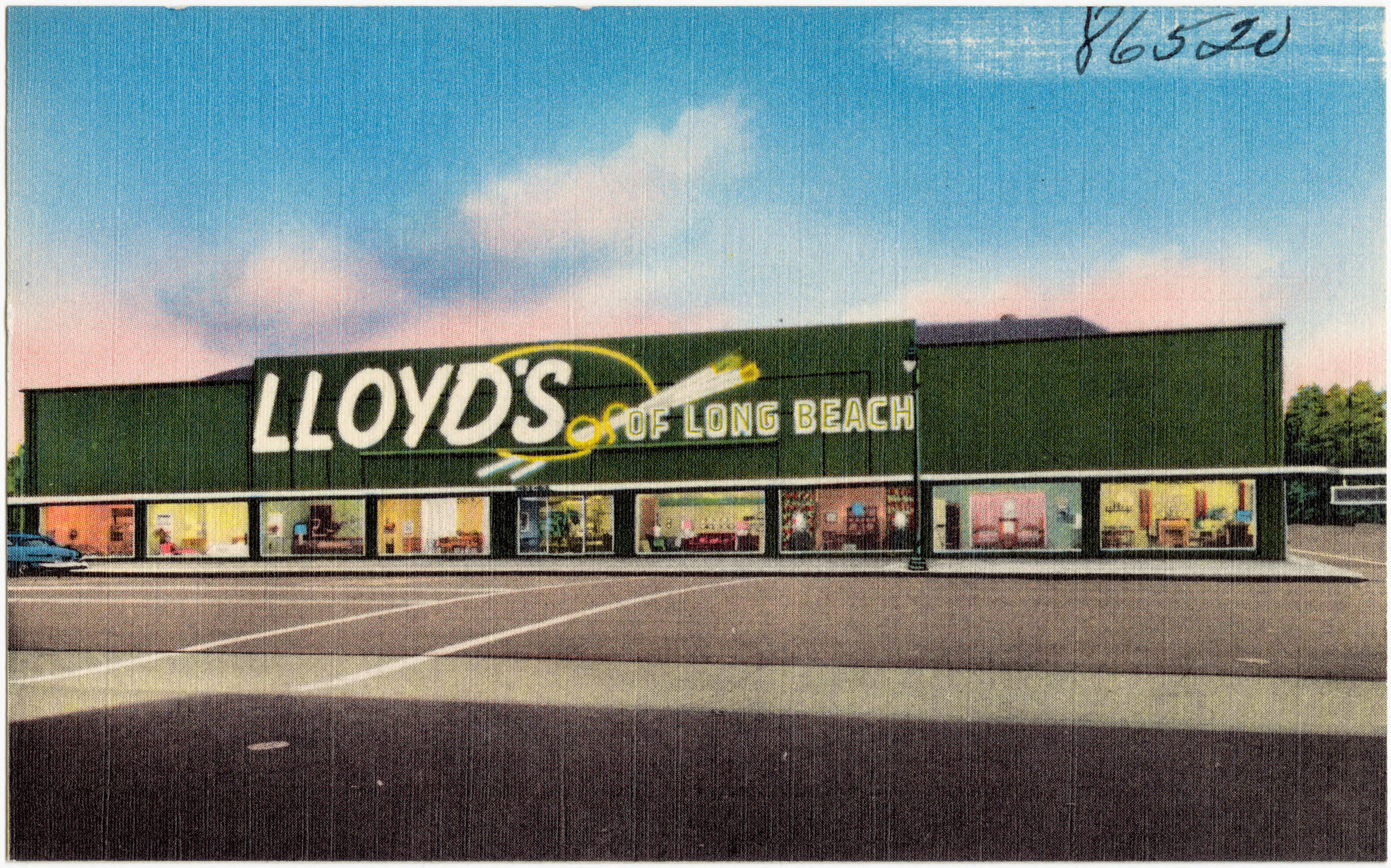
Lloyd's of Long Beach, 4141 Atlantic Ave., c. 1930-45

Southern California chain Robert's department store had its flagship store in Bixby Knolls at 4450 Atlantic Avenue. It opened in December 1967 and was 52,000 sq. ft. in size. closed in 1994, and sat empty for 15 years. It was razed only in 2009, to make way for a new Marshalls. The loss of the store was long symbolic of the decline of Bixby Knolls as a retail center, and in a broader sense. The Petroleum Club operated between 1955 and 2019.

Notable architecture includes:

- Hugh R. Davies - 20th Century House, International and Streamline Moderne styles
- Kirtland Cutter

== See also ==
- Neighborhoods of Long Beach, California
