= Fanny Bixby Spencer =

American philanthropist and antiwar writer

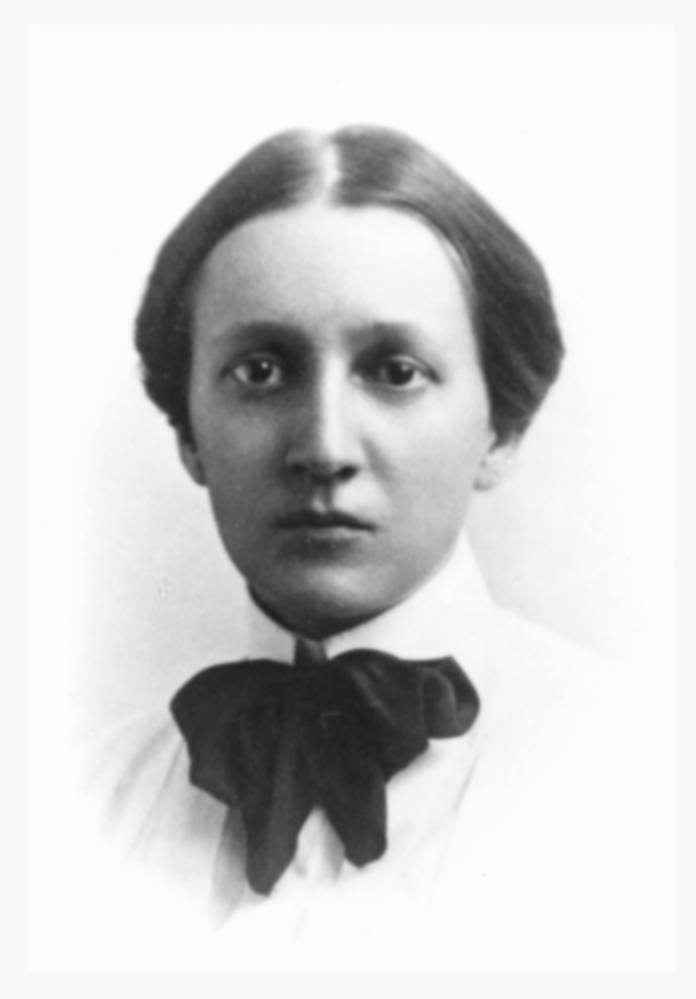
Fanny Bixby c. 1909

Fanny Weston Bixby Spencer (November 6, 1879 – April 30, 1930), also referred to as Fanny Bixby was an American philanthropist and antiwar writer. She joined the fledgling Long Beach police force in January 1908, making her one of the country's earliest policewomen.

== Family and education ==
She was born Fanny Weston Bixby in Los Angeles, California, the youngest of nine surviving children of Jotham Bixby and Margaret Hathaway Bixby. Jotham had arrived in California in 1852 from Maine, where he and several cousins had formed Flint, Bixby & Company, which acquired major landholdings, including the 27,000-acre Rancho Los Cerritos in what is now Long Beach. Fanny grew up wealthy, and although she was an active philanthropist, when she died in 1930 her $2.5 million estate was the largest ever probated in Orange County up to that point.

Fanny grew up on Rancho Los Cerritos, of which Jotham was the manager. Later, Fanny's grandfather, the prominent abolitionist and Unitarian minister George Whitefield Hathaway, came to live with the family. Fanny Bixby wrote about his abolitionist activities, including turning his house into a station on the Underground Railroad, in her pamphlet entitled How I Became a Socialist.

Fanny Bixby was educated at the Marlborough School in Los Angeles and the Pomona Preparatory School. She attended Wellesley College for three years but left without a degree. At Wellesley, she studied sociology with Emily Greene Balch, who would go on to win the 1946 Nobel Peace Prize.

== Philanthropy and police work ==
While still at Wellesley College, she worked for a time at the Denison Settlement House in Boston (founded by Balch) and the Nurse's Settlement House in San Francisco. On leaving college, she moved back to Long Beach, where she founded the Newsboy Club in the basement of a building her father owned so that the paper delivery boys would have somewhere to go that was off the streets. She also taught some of the newsboys to read. She donated money to various civic causes, including Long Beach's first hospital (Seaside Hospital), and the Walt Whitman School (private) and her settlement house, both in the Boyle Heights district on the east-side of Los Angeles. She and her husband often invited ghetto youth of working mothers to stay on their farm in Orange County to divert them from gangs and delinquency.

In 1907 she founded what is now Long Beach Memorial Medical Center. She also helped found the town of Costa Mesa, California.

When Long Beach formed its police force in 1908, Captain Tom Williams brought Fanny Bixby onto the force because of her extensive philanthropic work in the city. She was sworn in as a special police matron on January 1, 1908, making her one of the first women police officers in the country. The Los Angeles Herald reported of her appointment that California was "now demonstrating that when necessary a woman can become a policeman, or should we say policewoman?"

Fanny Bixby had charge of all cases involving women and children and was authorized to make arrests. She refused any pay, and thus did not become the country's first paid policewoman — that honor would go to Alice Stebbins Wells two years later. Fanny Bixby worked with the Long Beach police force for four years.

== Antiwar activities ==
An admirer of Leo Tolstoy, Fanny Bixby was a socialist and a pacifist. She published some poetry in the California Socialist Party's newspaper, the Oakland World, and she attended at least one antiwar meeting in Pasadena before the Espionage Act of 1917 made it risky to speak out against the government. After the war, she published her views in a number of antiwar pamphlets.

She was strongly against militaristic symbolism, such as standing for the Pledge of Allegiance, forcing children to sing the national anthem in schools, and saluting the flag. Her 1920 play The Jazz of Patriotism was about a woman who is ostracized for refusing to salute the flag. It premiered at the Egan Theater (later the Musart Theater) in downtown Los Angeles.

== Publications ==
- The Revolution Non-resistant (1919)
- The Jazz of Patriotism (an Anti-War Play) (1920)
- The Repudiation of War (1922)
- Militarism in America (1926)
- How I Became a Socialist (n.d., published as Fanny Bixby)
- Tolstoy and the Tolstoyan Life (n.d.)

== Personal life ==
Fanny Bixby met her future husband, W. Carl Spencer, at a Socialist Party meeting in 1917. They moved to Costa Mesa (then named Harper) in 1919, where they raised five adopted children and supported many others. Formerly a dockworker, Carl became a developer, and Fanny continued her philanthropy to such effect that in the decade they lived there, the town grew from 250 to 3,000 residents. The couple donated land to the city for a park and a library.

Fanny Bixby Spencer died of cancer at the age of 51. A couple of years before she died, she wrote to her cousin Sarah Bixby Smith: "I have three lines of work, bringing up my foster children, helping my neighbors (mostly Japanese farmers) and banging my head against the stone wall of militarism and conservatism that hems me in."

Her papers are housed at the Rancho Los Cerritos Museum.

== See also ==
- Bixby family
- Bixby land companies
