= Los Cerritos Ranch House =

Historic house in California, United States

- U.S. National Register of Historic Places
- U.S. National Historic Landmark
- Long Beach Historic Landmark
- California Historical Landmark
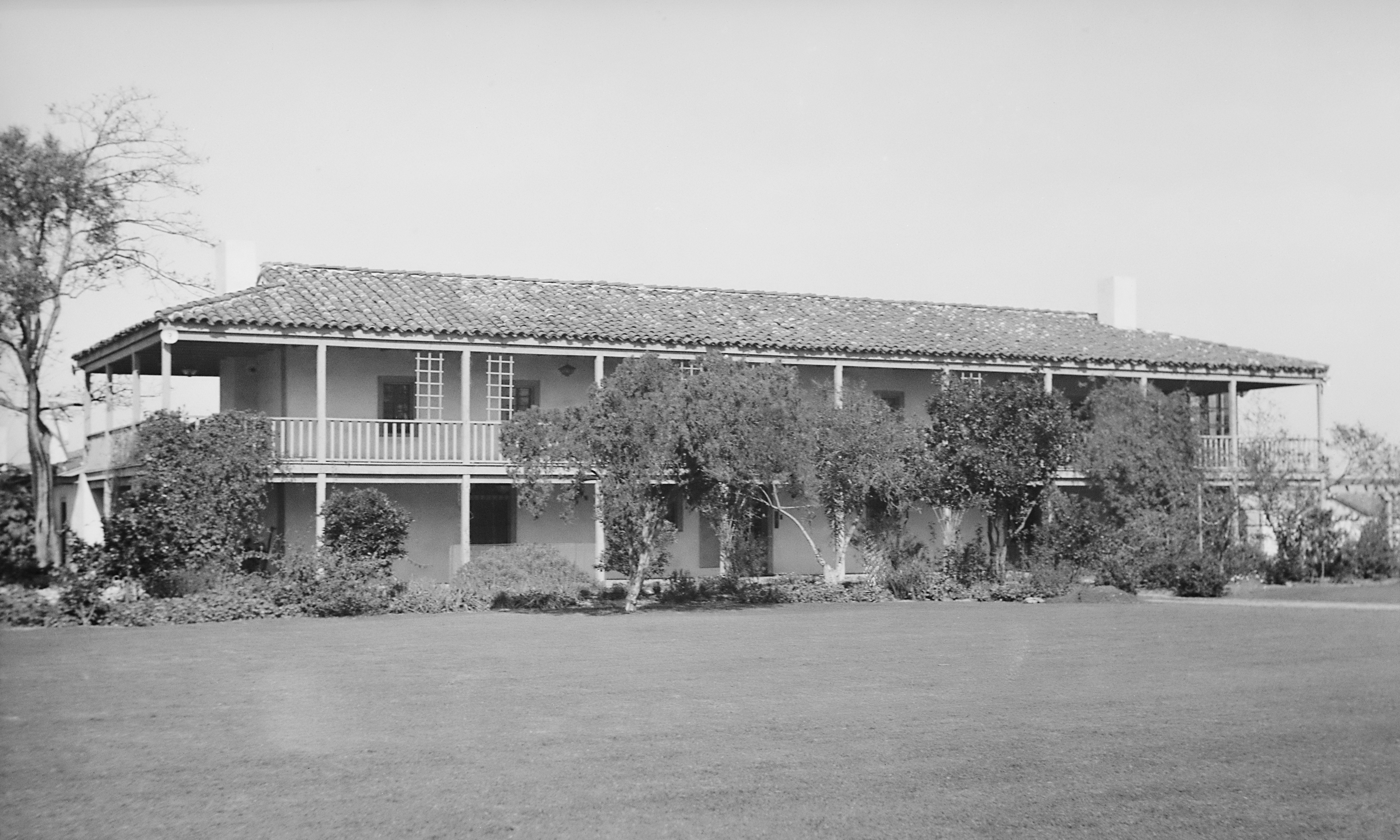
- Los Cerritos Ranch House

- Location within the Los Angeles metropolitan area Location within California Location within the United States
- Location: 4600 Virginia Road, Long Beach, California
- Coordinates: 33°50′11″N 118°11′40″W
- Built: 1844
- Website: www.rancholoscerritos.org
- NRHP reference No.: 70000135
- CHISL No.: 978

Significant dates
- Added to NRHP: April 15, 1970
- Designated NHL: April 15, 1970
- Designated CHISL: Aug. 23, 1988

Los Cerritos Ranch House, also known as Rancho Los Cerritos or Casa de los Cerritos, in Long Beach, California, United States, was "the largest and most impressive adobe residence erected in southern California during the Mexican period". Los Cerritos means "the little hills" in English. It was declared a National Historic Landmark in 1970. It is currently a museum.

== History ==
The structure, a Monterey Colonial adobe, was built in 1844 for merchant Jonathan Temple, a Yankee pioneer who became a Mexican citizen. The house was once the headquarters for a 27,000-acre (110 km^{2}) ranch; the major activity on the ranch was cattle and sheep.

The land was part of the 167,000-acre (680 km^{2}) Rancho Los Nietos land grant to Manuel Nieto that was eventually divided into six parcels, one of which was Rancho los Cerritos. In 1843, Temple purchased the rancho and built the adobe house in 1844 as headquarters for his cattle operations. In 1866, Temple sold the rancho to Flint, Bixby & Company which converted the ranch from cattle to sheep. Jotham Bixby, the brother of one of the company's founders, managed and resided at the ranch from 1866 to 1881. Jotham Bixby, known as the "father of Long Beach", eventually purchased the property for himself and raised seven children at the adobe. One of Jotham's children who was raised at the ranch house was Fanny Bixby Spencer, who later became known as a philanthropist, poet, and pacifist.

Beginning in the late 1870s, Bixby began leasing or selling portions of the ranch, which became the cities of Downey, Paramount and Lakewood. Between the 1880s and 1920, the adobe fell into disrepair. In 1929, Llewellyn Bixby (Jotham's nephew) purchased the property, and made extensive renovations to the house, including plaster cement coating, a new red-tiled roof, electricity, plumbing, fireplaces, a sun porch, new floors and much of the landscaping. Llewellyn Bixby died in 1942, and the family sold the house to the City of Long Beach in 1955. The City turned the house into a museum dedicated to educating the public about California's rancho period.

== Operation as a museum ==
Rancho Los Cerritos Historic Site was converted into a public museum operated by the Rancho Los Cerritos Foundation in partnership with the City of Long Beach. It is open for tours, programs and events. The house is furnished in a Victorian fashion as it would have been when Jotham Bixby raised his family there in the 1870s. There is a visitor center with exhibits about the site's history from Native American times to the present. A formal Italian garden includes olive, pomegranate and cypress trees planted by Temple. The site also features a 3,000-volume California history research library and a museum shop.

The museum was closed for 17 months from 2001–2002 to allow for seismic retrofitting, removal of lead paint and asbestos insulation, brickwork repairs and modifications to improve accessibility for the disabled.

== Gallery ==
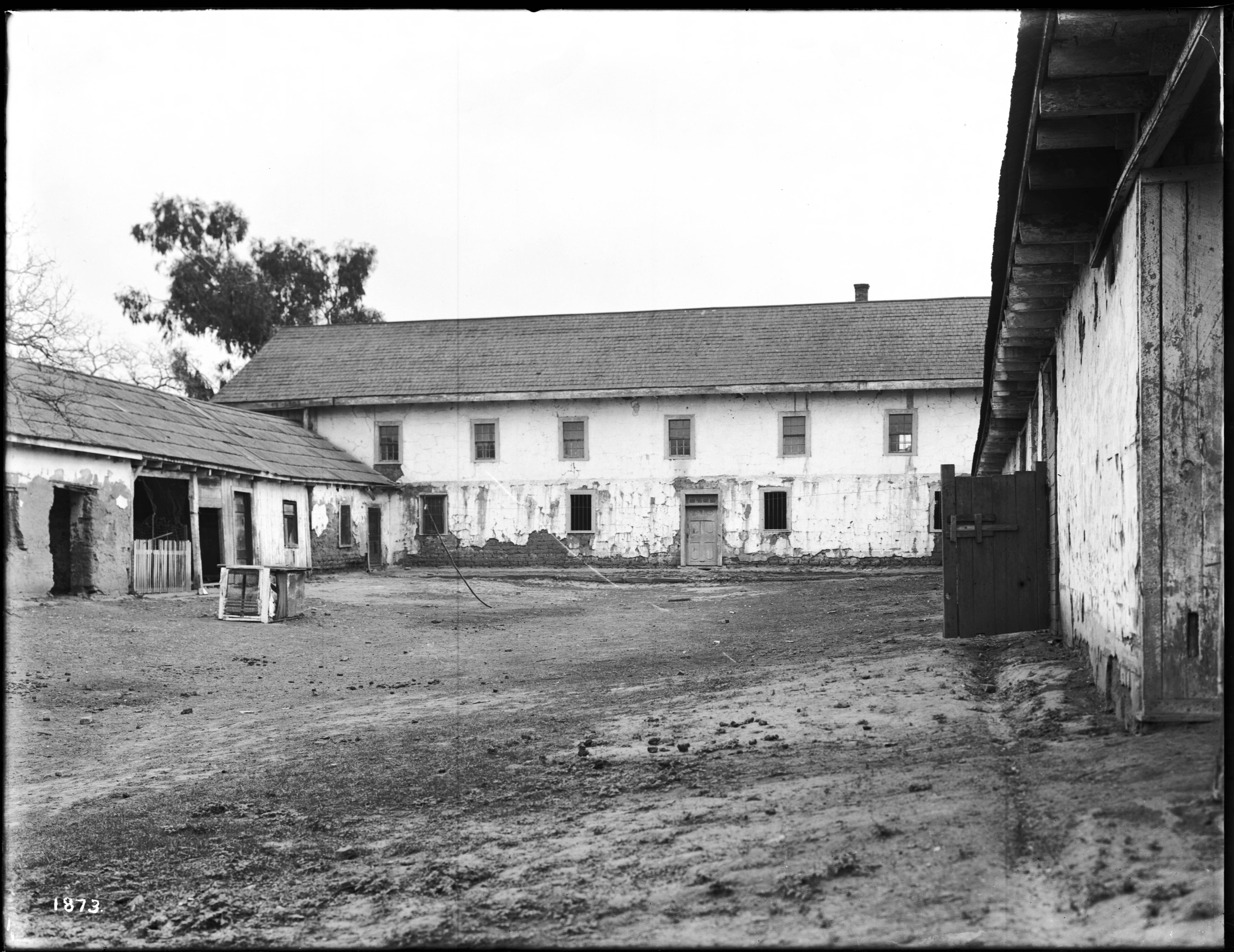
Patio before restoration, ca.1890-1910

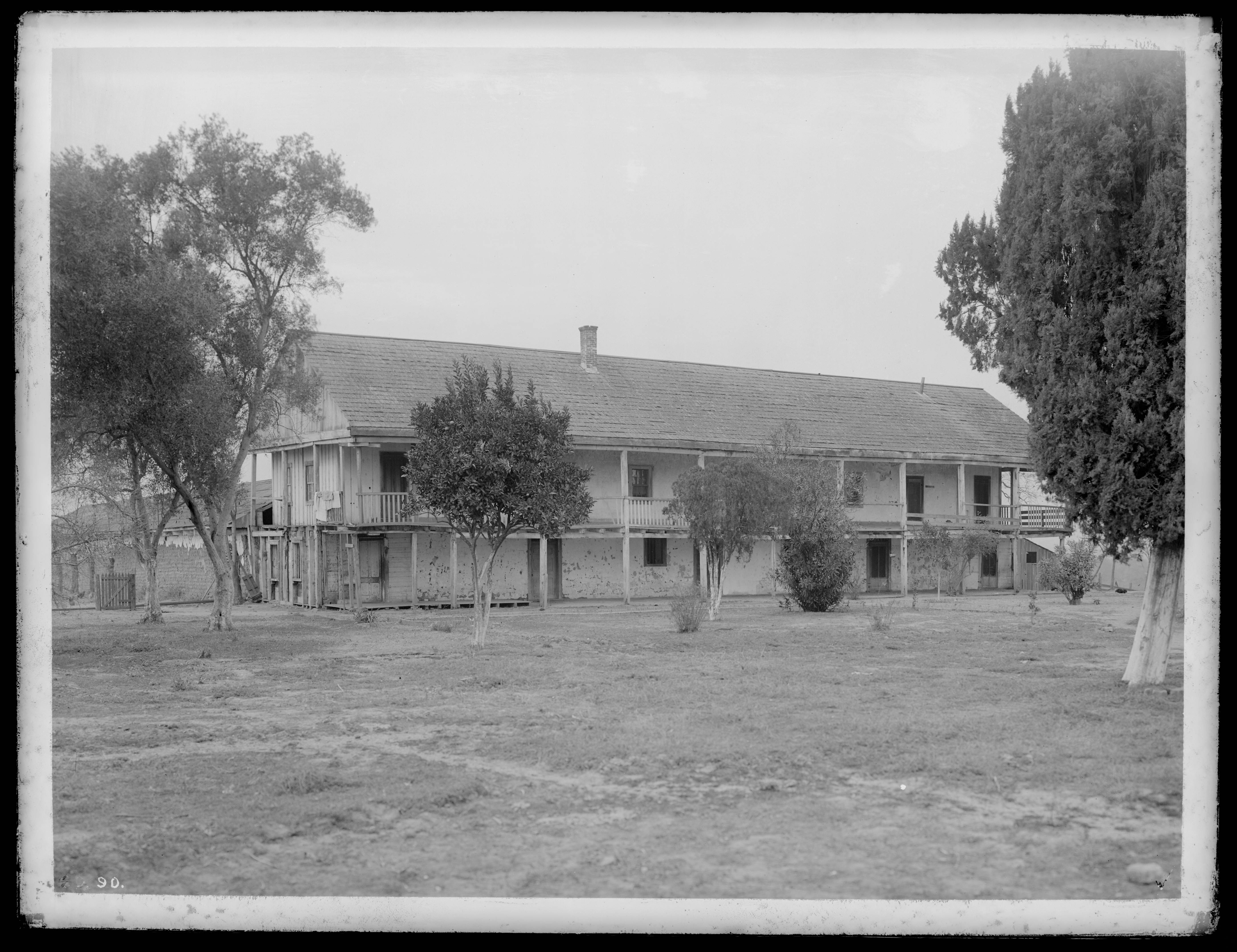
East front side, before restoration, ca.1900

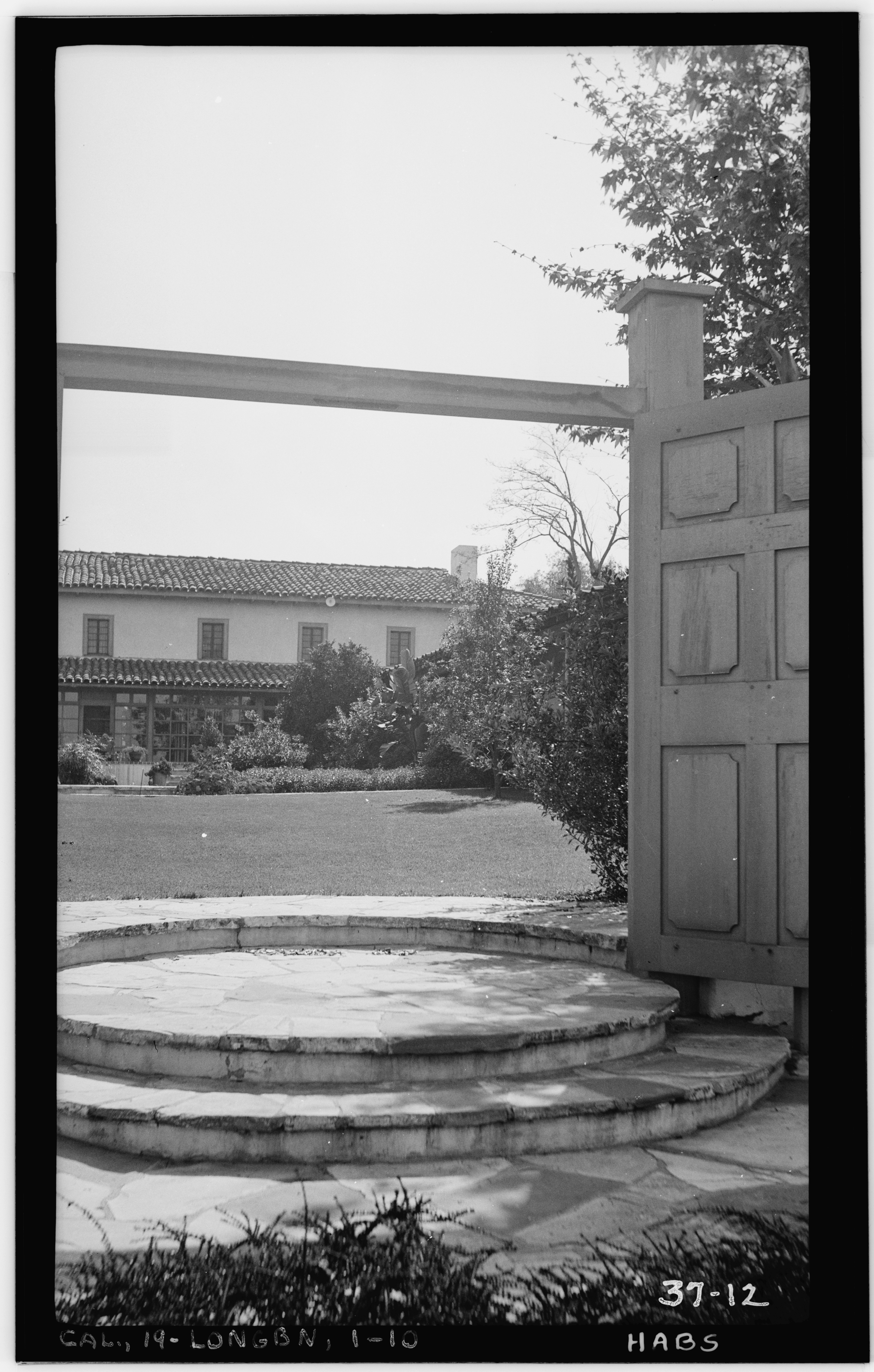
Patio after restoration. Photo by Daniel Cathcart, March 8, 1934.

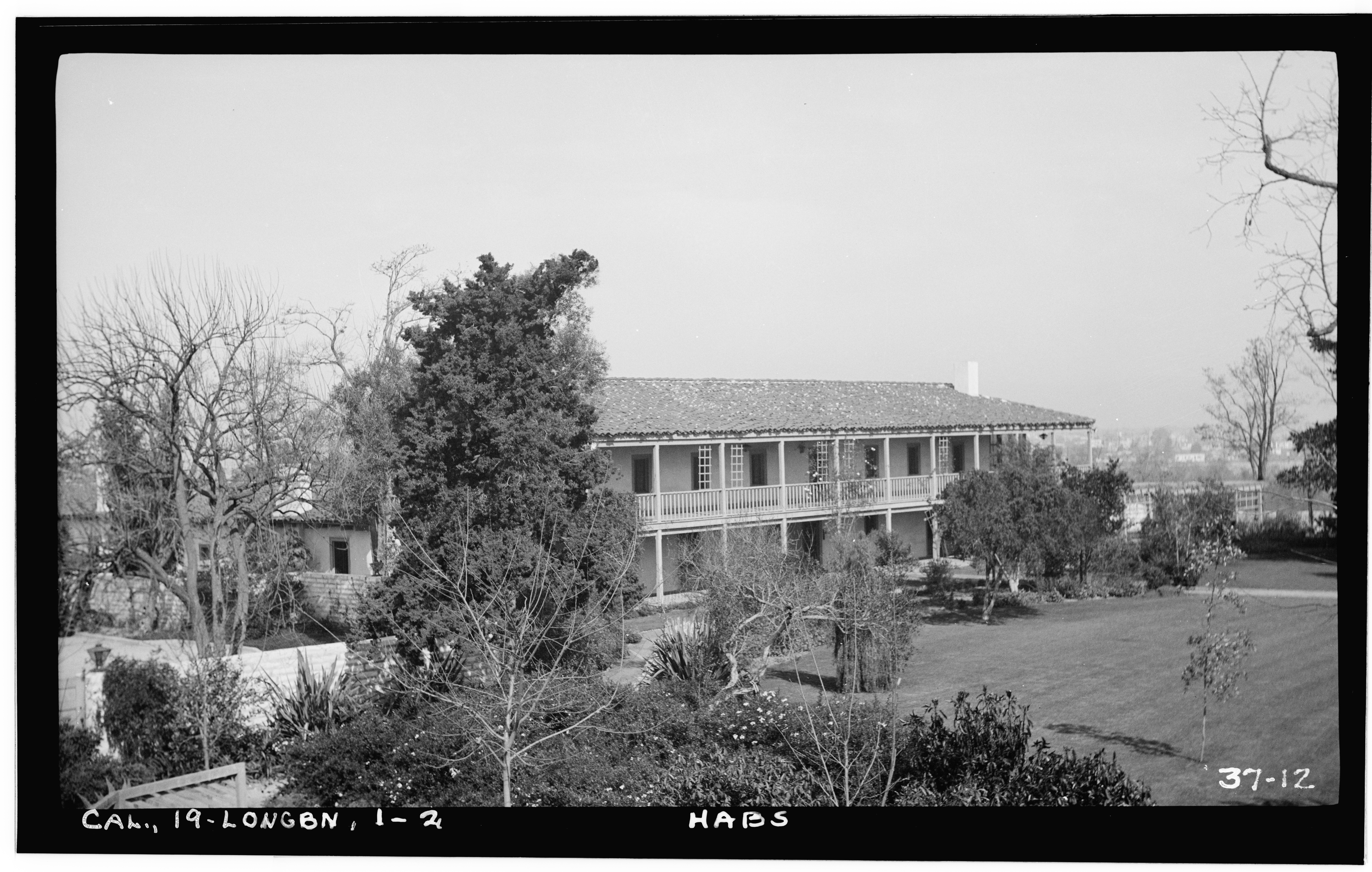
After restoration. Photo by Daniel Cathcart, March 8, 1934.

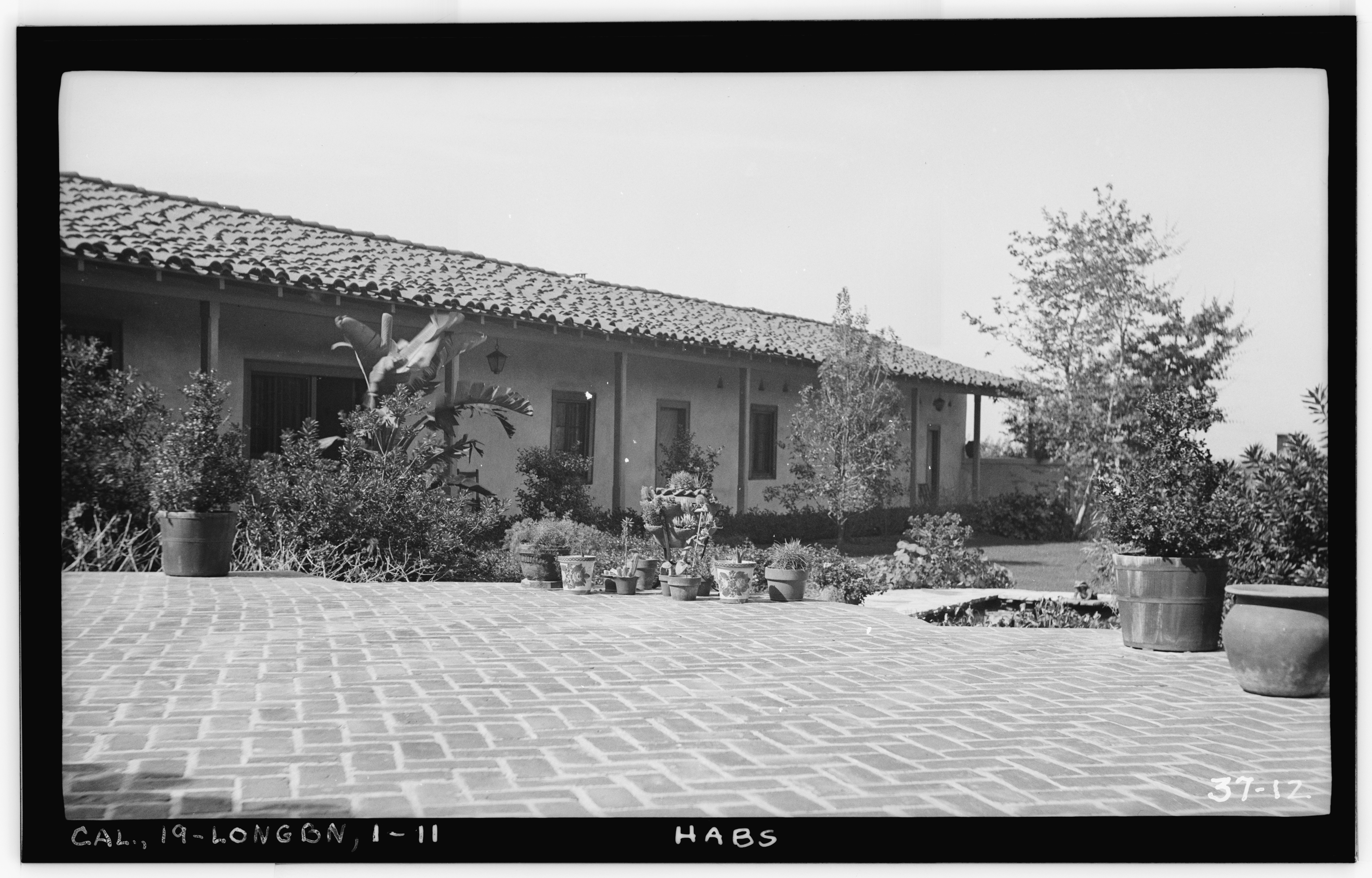
Patio

== See also ==
- Los Cerritos neighborhood
- Rancho Los Alamitos
- List of City of Long Beach Historic Landmarks
- National Register of Historic Places listings in Los Angeles County, California
- Ranchos of California
- California Historical Landmarks in Los Angeles County
