= Sarah Bixby Smith =

American writer (1871–1935)

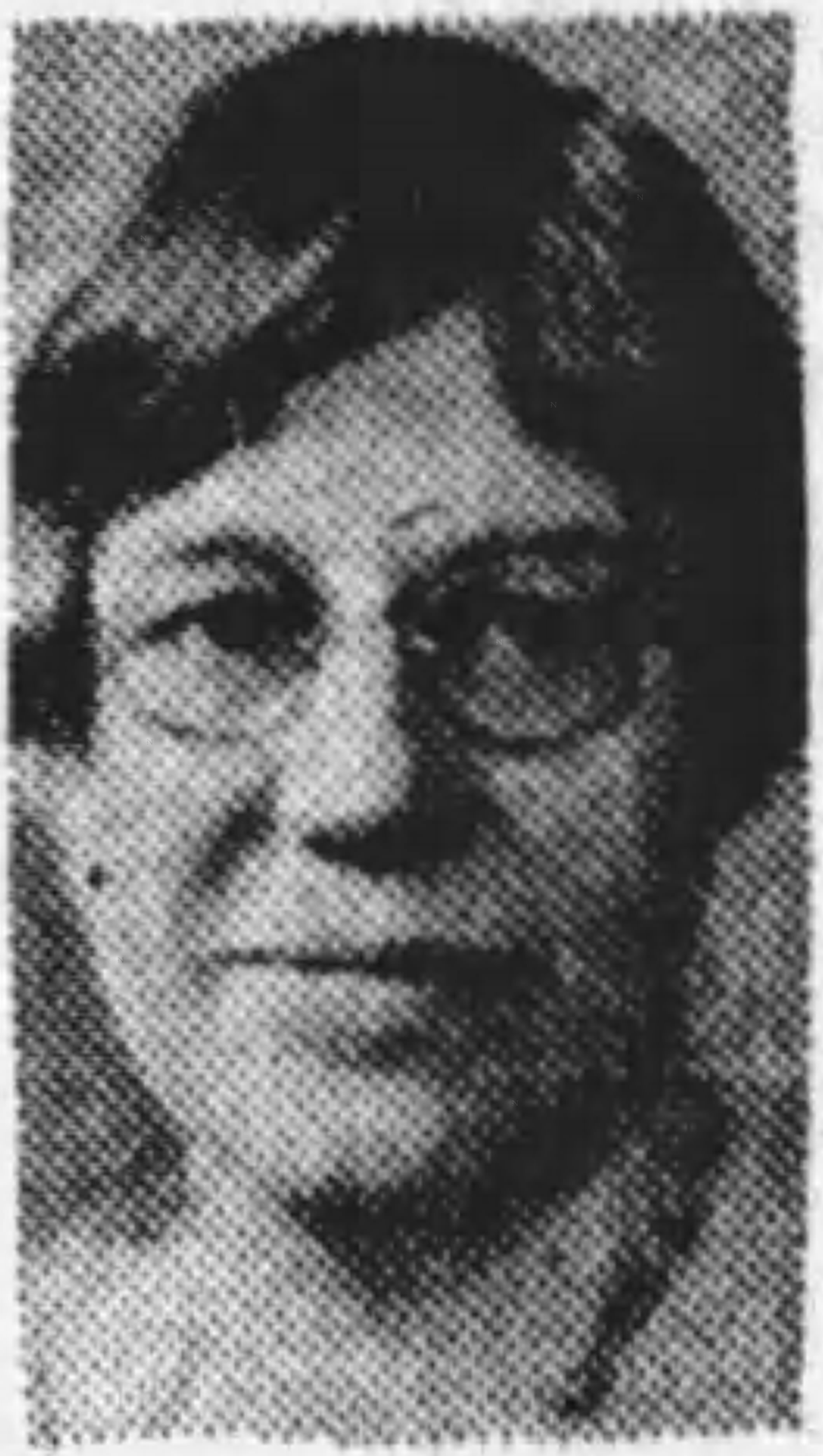
- Born: Sarah Hathaway Bixby; 1871; Rancho San Justo
- Died: 1935 (aged 63–64); Long Beach, California
- Occupation: Writer
- Spouses: Arthur Maxon Smith (m. 1896; div. 1916) Paul Jordan-Smith (m. 1916; div. 1934)

Sarah Bixby Smith (1871–1935) was a California writer and an advocate of women's education. Adobe Days, her memoir of growing up in southern California, is considered a classic of the genre.

== Early life and education ==
Sarah Hathaway Bixby was born at Rancho San Justo near San Juan Bautista, California, in 1871. Her parents were Llewellyn and Mary Hathaway Bixby. Llewellyn Bixby was a sheepman, and with other members of the Bixby family had come to California in 1852, driving sheep and cattle from the East. Llewellyn, with his brother Jotham and three cousins (John William Bixby, Thomas Flint, and Benjamin Flint), formed the Flint-Bixby Company in 1855 to buy land to run their livestock. By the mid-1880s, they had amassed large landholdings. In addition to Rancho San Justo were Rancho Los Cerritos and Rancho Los Alamitos in Long Beach, California, Rancho San Juan Cajón de Santa Ana, and part of Rancho de los Palos Verdes. Sarah spent her childhood on the San Justo, Los Cerritos, and Los Alamitos ranches.

She earned her bachelor's degree from Wellesley College in 1894 and became a writer and advocate for women's independence and higher education.

== Career ==
Bixby Smith wrote both lyric poetry and nonfiction. Her volumes of poetry include My Sage-brush Garden (1924), Pasear (1926), Wind Upon My Face (1930), and The Bending Tree (1933).

Bixby Smith is best known for three highly personal memoirs of California history. The first, "A Little Girl of Old California" (1920), was a brief memoir of her girlhood, later expanded into the book Adobe Days (1925). Adobe Days uses details of Smith's childhood on the family sheep ranches to tell the intertwined stories of the pioneering Bixby family as it rose to prominence in California and the development of Los Angeles from its frontier-town days to the end of the 19th century. It has been called "deservedly a classic of California autobiography ... [capturing] perfectly that intersection of civilization and frontier, New Englandism and Spanish Southwest, which turn-of-the-century California defined as its own special heritage." She also wrote Milestones in Los Angeles: Being a Brief Narrative of Los Angeles Through Five Decades (ca. 1933). At the time of her death, she was working on a book about the history of southern California.

Bixby Smith collaborated with second husband Paul Jordan-Smith on a manifesto extolling an elevated and spiritual feminism. Entitled The Soul of Woman: An Interpretation of the Philosophy of Feminism, it was published under his name in 1916.

== Advocacy ==
Bixby Smith was involved with women's groups and served at various times as president of the Friday Morning Club and vice-president of the American Association of University Women. She was also a trustee of Scripps College and a member of the Claremont School Board and the Historical Society of Southern California board. In the early 1930s, she was a delegate to the Pacific Relations Conference in Shanghai.

== Art ==
Bixby Smith was an amateur painter of landscapes and portraits in a realist style that hearkens back to the mid-nineteenth century. Her paintings prompted her second husband Paul Jordan-Smith's Disumbrationism hoax.

== Personal life ==
Bixby Smith was married and divorced twice. In 1896, she married Arthur Maxson Smith. With her inherited wealth, she financed Arthur's graduate divinity school studies at the University of Chicago and Harvard on his way to becoming a Unitarian minister. In 1900, they moved to Hawaii for two years when Arthur was appointed the head of Honolulu's Oahu College and Punahou School. They returned to the mainland as a result of Arthur's liaisons with Oahu College students and moved to Claremont, California, where Arthur taught philosophy at Pomona College from 1904 to 1909. They commissioned architect Arthur B. Benton to build them a 14-room mansion on 20 acres directly across the street from the campus.

In 1909, when Bixby Smith discovered that her husband had been having an affair with the children's au pair, she helped him to get a new position in northern California at the First Unitarian Church in Berkeley. Smith's life became more complicated when she got romantically involved with Paul Jordan-Smith, an interim minister at the same church, who had been divorced in Chicago three years earlier, and who was also a graduate student and instructor in the English Department at the University of California, Berkeley. When their liaison was discovered, the English Department faculty voted not to renew his fellowship.

After Bixby Smith's 1916 divorce from Arthur and marriage on March 30 of the same year to Paul, the couple moved with the children to her mansion in Claremont, which had in the meantime been turned into a school for boys by W. E. Garrison. In 1917, the school's lease ended and they began renovating the house back into a private residence, which they named Erewhon on completion. Around this time, they met and subsequently became friends with one of Bixby Smith's cousins, the photographer Edward Weston, who made a photographic portrait of her around 1919. There are also a number of Weston photographs of bathers shot around Erewhon's indoor pool. In late 1926, the couple moved to a mansion at 4800 Los Feliz Boulevard in Los Angeles, where their dinner parties were famous for bringing members of the city's bohemian circles together with the ruling oligarchy. By early 1934, Paul had left Bixby Smith and they were divorced.

From her marriage to Arthur Maxson Smith, she had five children: Arthur Jr. (known as Maxson), Bradford, Llewellyn, Roger, and Janet. Her marriage to Paul added his three children from an earlier marriage (to Tennessee-born Ethel S. Park) to the household: Isabella Lucile, Wilbur Jordan, and Ralph Wendell, who lived part of their young lives with their father and stepmother at Claremont, and the rest of the time with their mother and stepfather in Houston.

== Death and legacy ==
Bixby Smith, a diabetic, died of a trichinosis infection in Long Beach, California, on September 13, 1935, at the age of 64.

Bixby Smith's correspondence, along with photographs, press clippings, and other documents, are in the Charles E. Young Research Library Department of Special Collections at the University of California, Los Angeles. Rancho Los Cerritos (now run as a museum) houses the Sarah Bixby Smith Manuscript Collection and has four of her oil paintings on display.

== Books ==
Poetry

- My Sage-brush Garden (Torch Press, 1924)
- Pasear (Torch Press, 1926)
- Poems: Selected for Americanization Classes (1929)
- Wind Upon My Face (J. Zeitlin, 1930)
- The Bending Tree (J. Murray, 1933)

Nonfiction

- "A Little Girl of Old California" (1920)
- Adobe Days: A Book of California Memories (J. Zeitlin, 1925)
- Milestones in Los Angeles: Being a Brief Narrative of Los Angeles Through Five Decades (ca. 1933)

== See also ==
- Bixby family
- Bixby land companies
