= Leonie Pray House =

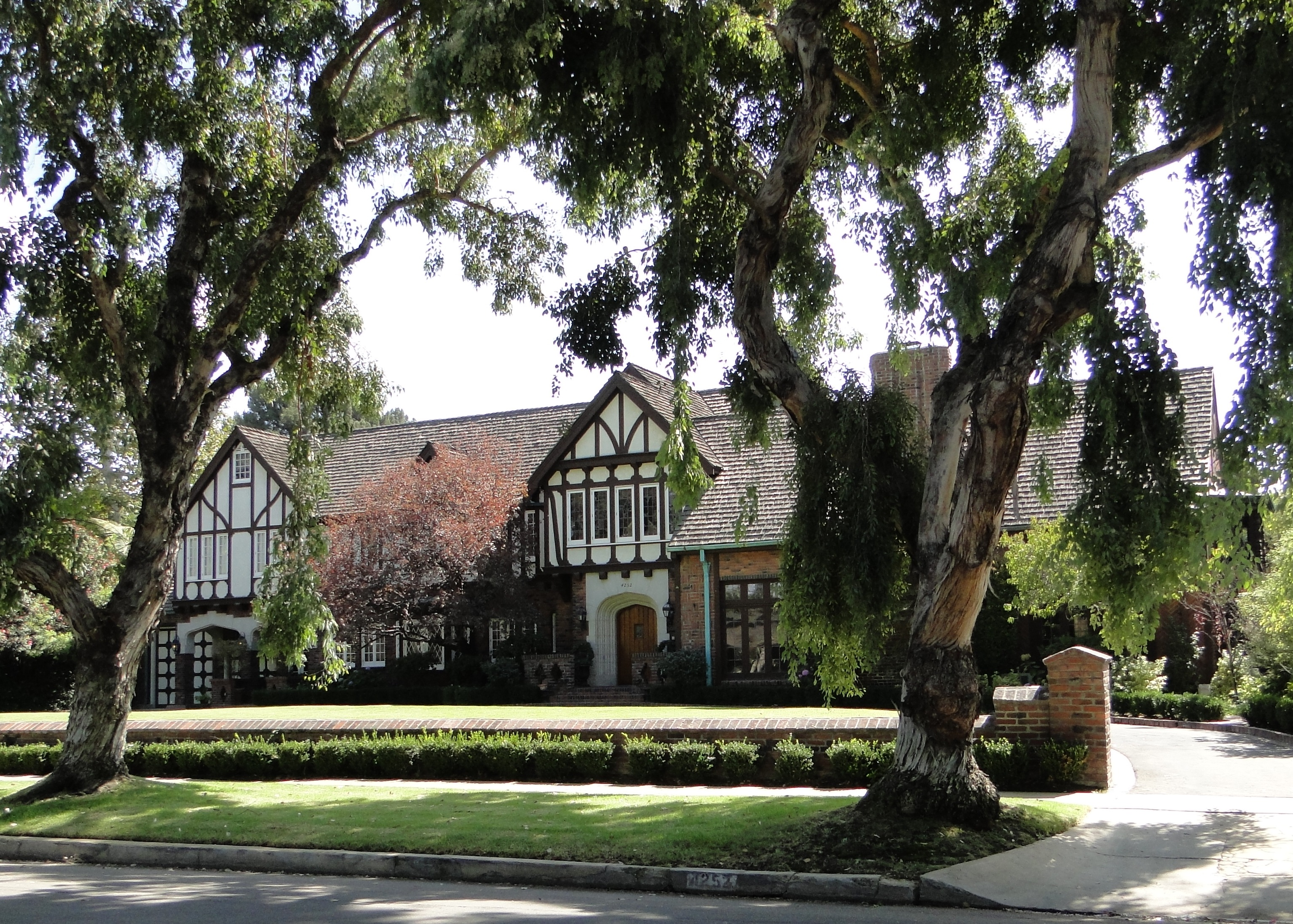
- Leonie Pray House, October 2009

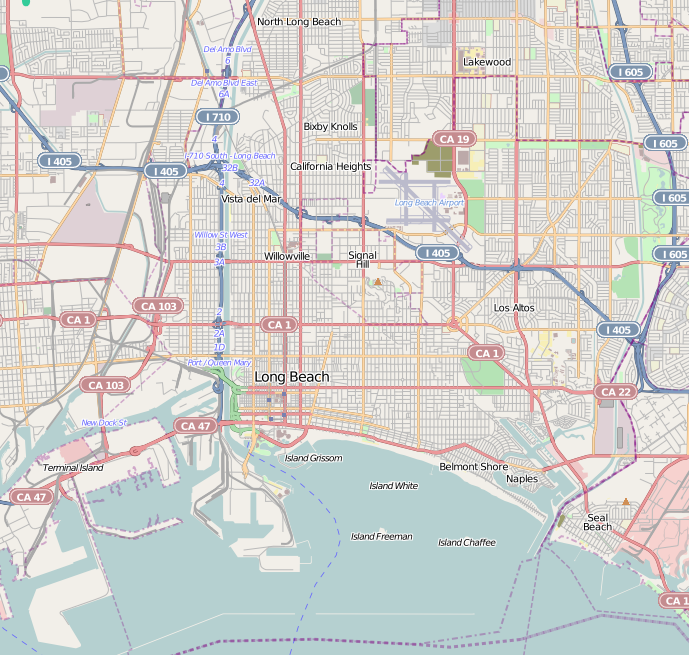
- Location in Long Beach
- 33°50′02″N 118°11′47″W
- Location: 4252 Country Club Dr., Long Beach, California

History
- Built: 1927

Site notes
- Architect: Clarence Aldrich
- Architectural style: English Tudor Revival
- Governing body: Private

Long Beach Historic Landmark

Leonie Pray House, also known as "Dawson-Pray House," is a Long Beach Historic Landmark located in the Los Cerritos neighborhood of Long Beach, California. It is a 6,500-square-foot (600 m^{2}) English Tudor Revival mansion designed by architect Clarence Aldrich. It has been used as a filming location for films and television series, including Donnie Darko, Not Another Teen Movie and Beverly Hills, 90210.

== History ==
In 1907, William E. "Billy" Babb arrived in Long Beach. He was the manager of a phone company and also a building contractor. Babb and his business partners completed plans for an eleven acre residential development on Signal Hill, shortly before oil was discovered there. Subsequently, Babb made a fortune on oil royalties, and designed and constructed 4252 Country Club Drive in 1927.

In 1929, the house was purchased by Russell Honore Pray (1892-1971) for his wife, Leonie Pray. Russell Pray was a lawyer who graduated from the University of Michigan Law School in 1913. He served in France during World War I and held the rank of captain at the time of his discharge. Following discharge, he remained in Paris, first attending Sorbonne University, then practicing law. While living in France, he met his wife, Leonie Pray.

The couple married in Paris after "a whirlwind courtship" and then moved to Long Beach. She attended a school in Pasadena to rid herself of her French accent, and as a graduation present, Russell Pray purchased the English Tudor house for her.

Beginning in 1932 and continuing through the 1970s, the Prays decorated the house with flowers and a two-story Christmas tree and held an annual New Year's Eve party at the house. Following the 1973 open house, the Long Beach Press-Telegram wrote: "Everyone is still talking about Leonie Pray's elegant New Year's Eve party, so I will too. Her lovely Los Cerritos home bloomed with pink azaelas but the guests were most impressed by the 14-foot Christmas tree. By a trick of light selection when the 300 tree lights are on, the observer gets an image of four magnificent trees." In 1976, a Long Beach newspaper described the holiday tradition: "Champagne sparkled at the Los Cerritos home of Leonie Pray just as it has each New Year's Eve for half a century. Except for the World War II years, Leonie and her late husband, Russell, invited friends and neighbors to open house."

The house was a center of social life for the upper class of Long Beach for many years. Leonie became an actress in community theater while her husband practiced law. A Long Beach newspaper later wrote that "it was in the Pray home that Leonie starred as a hostess."

Liberace, then a young concert pianist, made one of his first appearances in the Prays' living room. Opera star Risë Stevens also sang for a select group at the home.

In 1966, the Prays were still living in the house when the Long Beach Independent ran a story on the house. The paper wrote: "When things get dull on the fishing and hunting fronts, one can always turn to the North Forties, out in Los Cerritos Heights, for wildlife notes. That applies especially to the Russell and Leonie Pray home, 4252 Country Club Drive, where there is never any end to wildlife. Perhaps it is because both Russell and Leonie love birds and animals of all kinds."

In 1968, a Molotov cocktail firebomb ignited a blaze at the home. At the time, Russell Pray, then 76 years old and the senior partner in the law firm of Pray, Price, Williams and Deatherage, told officers he heard an explosion in the alley behind his home and ran outside to see flames shooting up. He called the police and the fire department, but was able to extinguish the fire with a garden hose. Damage was confined to the rear gate which was scorched and blackened.

Russell Pray died in 1971, and Leonie Pray continued to live at the house.

The house was subsequently acquired by William F. Dawson and is sometimes referred to as the Dawson-Pray House.

== Architecture and historic designation ==
The English Tudor Revival structure was designed by Long Beach architect Clarence Aldrich. It combines red brick with artificial dark wood timbers and stucco, a gothic arched entry, a cathedral ceiling with wood trusses in the living room, leaded glass casement windows and gabled dormers. The house also has a huge two story living room paneled entirely in hand carved wood, was a natural setting for "salons."

It has been designated as a Long Beach Historic Landmark. A web site dedicated to the Long Beach Historic Landmarks notes that "this English Tudor mansion is one of the most architecturally significant residential structures in Long Beach. Its scale, size, and detail is unmatched in the city."

== Shooting location in films and television ==
The house and neighborhood have been used in several feature films. The neighborhood has become known as the "American Pie" neighborhood, because the American Pie feature was shot there. The house that was the home of Ferris Bueller in Ferris Bueller's Day Off is on the same block at 4160 Country Club Drive. The Pray House has been used in the following films:

- In 1983, the house was used in the American thriller film The Star Chamber, where this home was featured as the secret and exclusive location where the Star Chamber met, a group of judges who identify criminals who fell through the judicial system's cracks and then take actions against them outside the legal structure. The last scene revealing where the Star Chamber had been meeting secretly was filmed here.
- In 2001, the house was used as the home of Jim Cunningham (played by Patrick Swayze) in Donnie Darko. The title character (played by Jake Gyllenhaal) sets fire to the house, and police find evidence in the wreckage that Cunningham is involved in child pornography.
- Also in 2001, the house was the home of leading man Jake "the Jock" (played by Chris Evans) in Not Another Teen Movie.
- In the television series Beverly Hills, 90210, the house was the home of Ty Collins. It is featured in the episode "Help Me, Rhonda" in which Adrianna meets with Ty's parents.

== See also ==
- List of City of Long Beach Historic Landmarks
