= Disumbrationism =

Hoax art movement (1924–27)

Disumbrationism was a hoax masquerading as an art movement that was launched in 1924 by Paul Jordan-Smith, a novelist, Latin scholar, and authority on Robert Burton from Los Angeles, California.

Annoyed at the cold reception his wife Sarah Bixby Smith's realistic still lifes had received from an art exhibition jury, Jordan-Smith sought revenge by styling himself as "Pavel Jerdanowitch" (Cyrillic: Па́вел Жердaнович), a variation on his own name. Never having picked up a paint brush in his life, he then painted Yes, we have no bananas, a blurry, badly painted picture of a Pacific islander woman holding a banana over her head, having just killed a man and putting his skull on a stick. In 1925, Smith entered the banana picture under a new title of Exaltation in New York's "Exhibition" of the Independents at the Waldorf-Astoria. He made a suitably dark and brooding photograph of himself as Jerdanowitch, and submitted the work to the same group of critics as representative of the new school "Disumbrationism". He explained Exaltation as a symbol of "breaking the shackles of womanhood". To his amusement, if not to his surprise, the Disumbrationist daub won praise from the critics who had belittled his wife's realistic painting.

More Disumbrationist paintings followed: a composition of zig-zag lines and eyeballs he called Illumination; a garish picture of a black woman doing laundry that he called Aspiration, and which a critic praised as "a delightful jumble of Gauguin, Pop Hart and Negro minstrelsy, with a lot of Jerdanowitch individuality"; Gination, an ugly, lopsided portrait; and a painting named Adoration, of a woman worshipping an immense phallic idol, which was exhibited in 1927.

The same year, Jordan-Smith confessed to the Los Angeles Times that the Disumbrationist paintings were meant as a spoof.
