= Paul Jordan-Smith =

American journalist

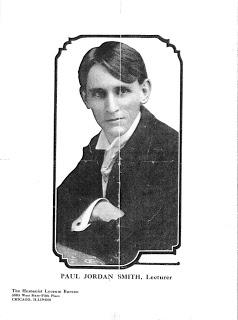
- Paul Jordan-Smith, from a lecture brochure ca. 1914 (before he hyphenated his last name)
- Born: April 19, 1885; Wytheville, Virginia
- Died: June 17, 1971 (aged 86); Santa Monica, California
- Writing career
- Genre: Literature

Paul Jordan-Smith (April 19, 1885 – June 17, 1971) was an American Universalist minister who also worked as a writer, lecturer and editor. Academically, he is regarded as one of the foremost authorities on the 17th-century British author and scholar Robert Burton. However, he is most well known for originating the hoax art movement Disumbrationism.

== Life and ministry ==
Paul Jordan Smith (his name was not hyphenated until later in life; see below) was born in Wytheville, Virginia. His father, John Wesley Smith, was a Southern Methodist minister who dreamed of starting a college and invested in land in Dade County, Georgia, outside Chattanooga, Tennessee. His wife (the former Lucy Jordan) and son joined him there in 1891, but the venture failed and the family returned to Virginia.

While a student at Emory and Henry College, Paul Jordan Smith secretly married Ethel Sloan Park in September 1904. Their daughter Lucille Isabella (Isabel Jordan) Smith was born in August 1905. He graduated from U.S. Grant University in Chattanooga, Tennessee in 1906. A local Unitarian minister recommended that he study for the ministry, and although admitted to Harvard Divinity School he enrolled in the more affordable Ryder Divinity School of the Universalist Lombard College in Galesburg, where he received a bachelor of divinity degree in 1908.

He served briefly as a minister at Universalist churches in Unionville, Missouri, and Kansas City and developed a reputation as an outstanding lecturer on science and religion. He moved to Chicago in 1910, where he worked at the Independent Religious Society and later got a job as a minister and ran a settlement house. He also enrolled part-time in graduate classes at the University of Chicago and developed a broad acquaintance among both literary and social activist circles, including lawyer Clarence Darrow, activist Emma Goldman, novelist John Cowper Powys, editor and publisher Margaret Anderson, writer Floyd Dell, Chicago Little Theatre founder Maurice Browne, and bookseller George Millard. In the process, he became a passionate book collector and decided on a career in literature. Jordan Smith also developed an interest in art through visits to the Art Institute of Chicago.

In 1913 his wife Ethel divorced him and his mother died. After a few months in the South, he traveled to Berkeley, California with letters of introduction, filled in for a minister in Eureka in the summer of 1914, and enrolled as a doctoral student and teaching fellow in the English Department at the University of California, Berkeley. He was hired as a substitute minister of the First Unitarian Church of Berkeley after Arthur Maxson Smith resigned when his wife, the heiress Sarah Bixby Smith, caught him having an affair and sued for divorce. Paul Jordan-Smith became romantically involved with Sarah, a writer, and their involvement became public, to their dismay, before the divorce was final. It was around this time that Paul assumed the hyphenated Jordan-Smith as his last name, in part to disguise his liaison with Sarah, which he feared might damage his academic career. Despite this precaution, the English Department—then headed by Charles Mills Gayley—voted not to renew his fellowship, putting an end to his plans for an academic career.

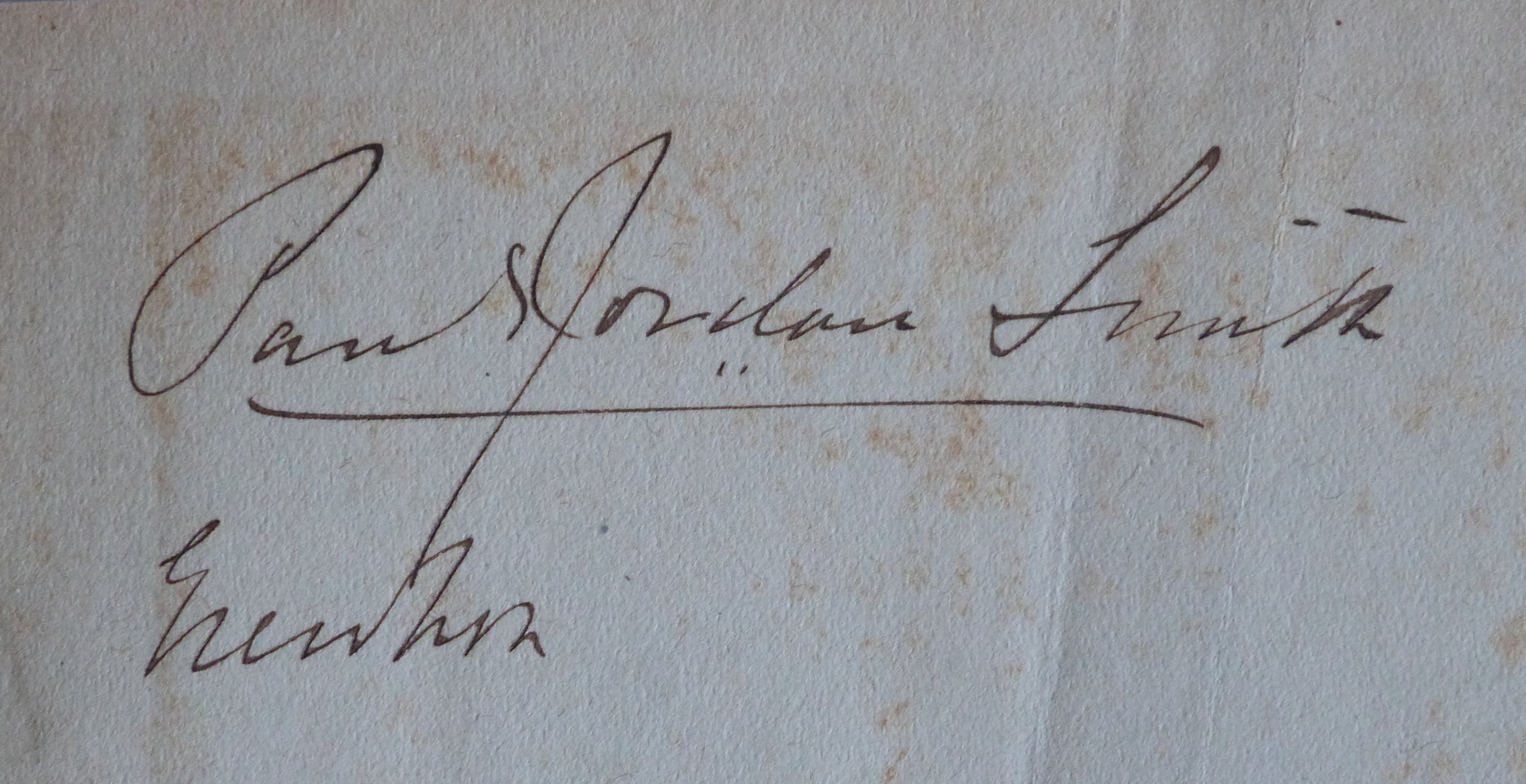
Signature of American Unitarian Minister, writer and book collector Paul Jordan-Smith (1885–1971), in Hickey, Memoirs, publ. 1913-1925 ("Paul Jordan-Smith Erewhon")

Jordan-Smith married Sarah on March 30, 1916, immediately after her divorce came through. The couple then moved with Sarah's children to her former home in Claremont, California, which had been rented to a school for boys. In 1917, the school's lease ended and they began renovating the house back into a private residence, which they named Erewhon after the Samuel Butler novel. Around this time, they met and subsequently became friends with one of Sarah's cousins, the photographer Edward Weston, who made several photographic portraits of Jordan-Smith. Eventually, the couple moved to a mansion on Los Feliz Boulevard in Los Angeles, where Jordan-Smith had a detached library and writing studio on the property.

Though Jordan-Smith did not have to work (thanks to Sarah's inherited wealth), he lectured around southern California, at women's clubs such as the Friday Morning Club (of which Sarah was later president), at the Ebell Club, and elsewhere. He also taught courses on English and American literature at the new University of California Extension program in Los Angeles. Encouraged by some of the philanthropists who attended his talks, he took on leadership of the recently formed People's Council of America for Peace and Democracy, an antiwar organization. The group did well until its leaders came under attack when the U.S. government began to crack down on antiwar opposition through the Espionage Act of 1917. To avoid prosecution, Jordan-Smith was obliged to give up making antiwar speeches and to swear that he did not have any German affiliations or friends.

Jordan-Smith served for a time as the educational director of the Walt Whitman School, a progressive secondary school founded in East Los Angeles in 1919.

Jordan-Smith eventually left Sarah for his cousin Dorothy and the couple divorced. He died on June 17, 1971.

Jordan-Smith had three children. His son Wilbur Jordan Smith was head of UCLA Library's Department of Special Collections from 1951 to 1971, and Wilbur's son Paul Jordan-Smith helped D.M. Dooling found Parabola magazine and served as its Epicycle editor.

== Literary career ==
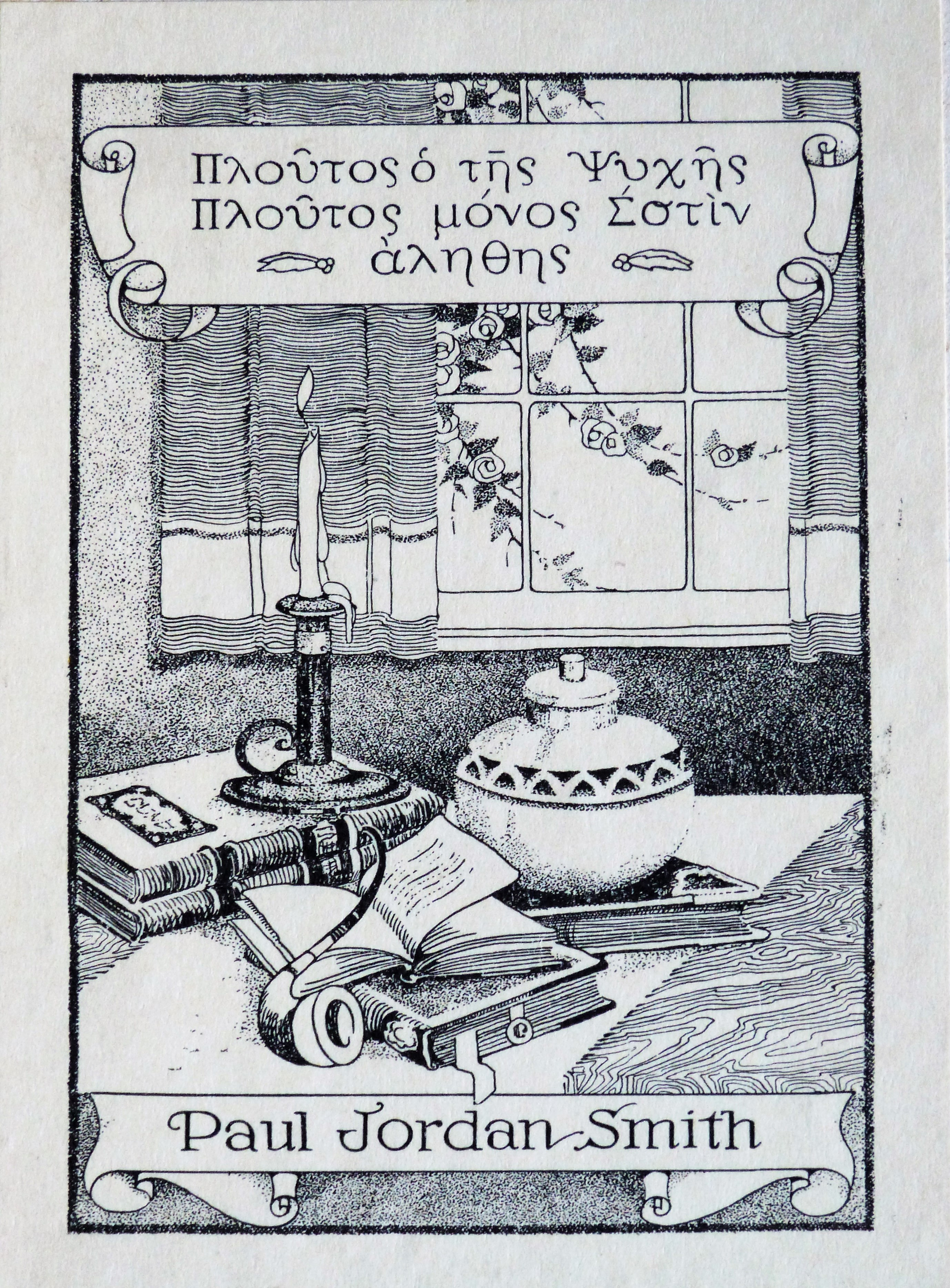
Exlibris of American Unitarian Minister, writer and collector Paul Jordan-Smith (1885–1971), in Hickey, Memoirs, publ. 1913–1925.

Jordan-Smith was a great admirer of the 17th-century British author and scholar Robert Burton. He co-edited the first all-English translation (having himself translated all of the Latin quotes) of Burton's magnum opus, The Anatomy of Melancholy, following it up with Bibliographica Burtoniana, which included both a study of Burton and a scholarly key to the sources Burton used in The Anatomy of Melancholy. He collected books relating to Burton, and after Sarah died, he gave the core of his collection to the Claremont Colleges Library in her memory. The Robert Burton Collection, as it is called, includes copies of the first six editions of Burton's Anatomy of Melancholy, a copy of the 1927 edition edited by Smith and Floyd Dell, and editions of various Renaissance Latin authors and others cited by Burton.

Jordan-Smith also wrote one of the first books on James Joyce, A Key to the Ulysses of James Joyce. He dedicated this book to Powys, who had persuaded him in 1922 to buy a then-rare and expensive first edition of Ulysses during one of Powys's stays at Erewhon, which they then read together.

Inspired by Sarah's ideas, Jordan-Smith collaborated with her on a feminist manifesto entitled The Soul of Woman: An Interpretation of the Philosophy of Feminism. It was published under his name in 1916.

He also served for a time in the 1940s and 1950s as the literary critic for the Los Angeles Times. and as such was seen on the cinema screen in 1949 introducing the trailer for the new MGM motion picture The Secret Garden, under the headline "Great Books Make Great Pictures."

His autobiography, The Road I Came, was published in 1960. His papers are housed in the UCLA Library Special Collections.

== Disumbrationism ==
Jordan-Smith may be best known today for a hoax that he initiated in 1924, in part out of a dislike of modern art that was evident as far back as 1913, when he saw (and largely rejected) the traveling version of the notorious Armory Show at the Art Institute of Chicago. Giving himself the Russian-sounding pseudonym Pavel Jerdanowitch, Jordan-Smith painted a small group of crudely Postimpressionist canvases that he then entered in art exhibitions around the country as exemplars of a new art movement known as Disumbrationism (i.e. painting without shadows). His canvases were well received on the whole until he got tired of sustaining the role and outed himself to a Los Angeles Times reporter in 1927.

== Books ==
- (as editor, with Floyd Dell) The Anatomy of Melancholy by Robert Burton. New York: Farrar & Rinehart, 1927. (English translation of the original Latin text.)
- Burton's Anatomy of Melancholy and Burtoniana. Oxford University Press, 1959. (A catalogue.)
- A Key to the Ulysses of James Joyce. 1927. Republished in 1968 by Haskell House, New York.
- Bibliographia Burtoniana: A Study of Robert Burton's "The Anatomy of Melancholy" with a Bibliography of Burton's Writings. Oxford University Press and Stanford University Press, 1931.
- Cables of Cobweb. New York: Lieber & Lewis, 1923 (novel).
- For the Love of Books: The Adventures of an Impecunious Collector. Oxford University Press, 1934.
- Nomad. Minton, Balch, 1925 (novel, dedicated to James Branch Cabell).
- On Strange Altars: A Book of Enthusiasms. 1923. Republished by Gordon Press Publishers, 1972.
- The Road I Came: Some Recollections and Reflections Concerning Changes in American Life and Manners Since 1890. Caldwell, Idaho: Caxton Printers, 1960.
- The Soul of Woman: An Interpretation of the Philosophy of Feminism. San Francisco: Paul Elder Company, 1916.
