= Los Cerritos, Long Beach, California =

Coordinates: 33.8307°N 118.1967°W

Los Cerritos, California
- Neighborhood of Long Beach
- Interactive map of Los Cerritos, California
- Country: United States
- State: California
- County: Los Angeles
- City: Long Beach

Los Cerritos (sometimes called Los Cerritos/Virginia Country Club) is a neighborhood with approximately 700 homes and 2,000 residents located within the Bixby Knolls neighborhood of Long Beach, California. Established in 1906, the Los Cerritos neighborhood has been used by the film industry of Hollywood with its historic, estate-sized homes. It was one of three finalists in the 2007 Neighborhood of the Year national competition.

== History ==
On October 7, 1906, 330 acres (130 ha) surrounding Rancho Los Cerritos were designated as the Los Cerritos subdivision. Once streets were cut out into the designed tract, the lots began to sell.

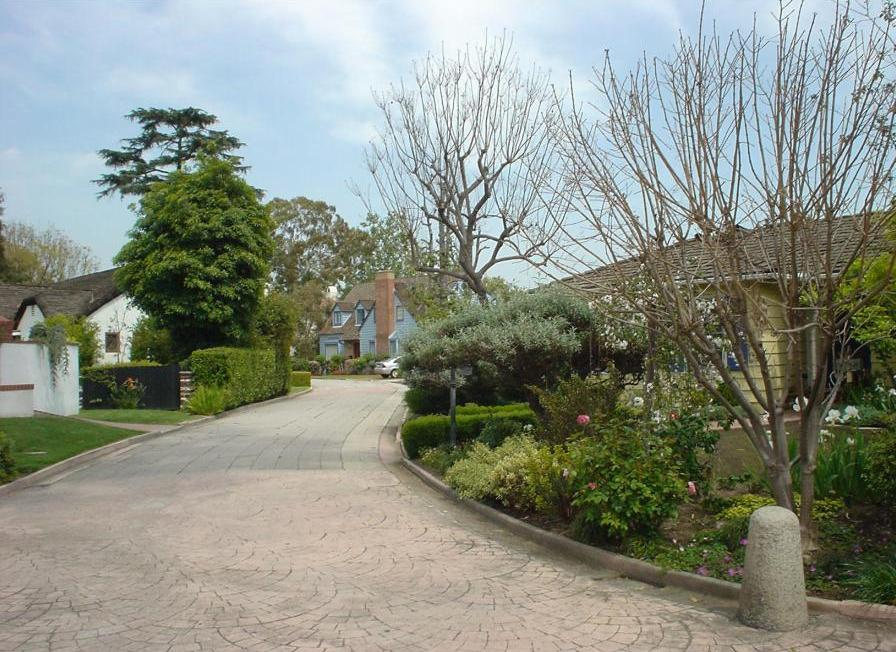
La Linda Drive looking North East from the entrance.

In 1920, Thomas Gilcrease purchased 10 acres (4.0 ha) along La Linda Drive and in 1922 subdivided them into a development called La Linda, Spanish for "the pretty." In 1929, 20th century architect Kirtland Cutter designed three award-winning homes in the Los Cerritos Neighborhood.

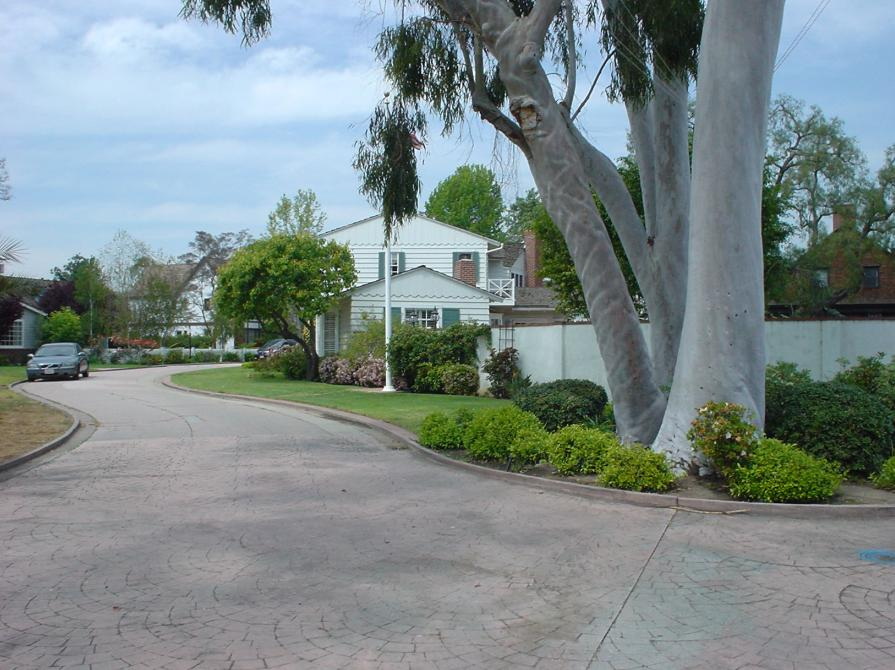
La Linda Drive looking North West from the entrance.

Until 1961, the neighborhood was served by the Pacific Electric Long Beach Line.

Now one of Long Beach's oldest gated communities, the residential make-up of La Linda has changed. Many of the newer homes are larger.

In 2007, Los Cerritos Neighborhood was one of three finalists in Neighborhood USA's Neighborhood of the Year national competition in Baton Rouge, Louisiana.

== Architecture ==
- Charles T. McGrew and Sons
- Clarence Aldrich – Leonie Pray House
- George Montierth
- Hugh Gibbs – residence of Newton T. Bass
- Paul Tay – the Pekrul House
- Edward Killingsworth - family home
- Coxhead and Coxhead – reconstruction of Bixby Ranch House on La Linda Drive
- Greene and Greene – Jennie A. Reeve House
- Kirtland Cutter – Casa el Sueño
- Kirtland Cutter – Clock House, built for president of the United States Golf Association John Clock and his wife Blanche
- Kurt Meyer

== Movies and television ==
In 1985, a home on Country Club Drive in the Los Cerritos neighborhood was used as the Bueller family home in the 1986 comedy film Ferris Bueller's Day Off and subsequently used in the 2001 comedy film Not Another Teen Movie, the 2002 thriller film Red Dragon, and in a Cheerios commercial. In 1998, two homes on Cedar Avenue in the Los Cerritos neighborhood were used in the 1999 teen comedy film American Pie. In August 2000, another home on Country Club Drive was used as the fictional home for the teenager Donnie Darko in the 2001 drama/psychological thriller/science fiction film Donnie Darko.

== Gallery ==
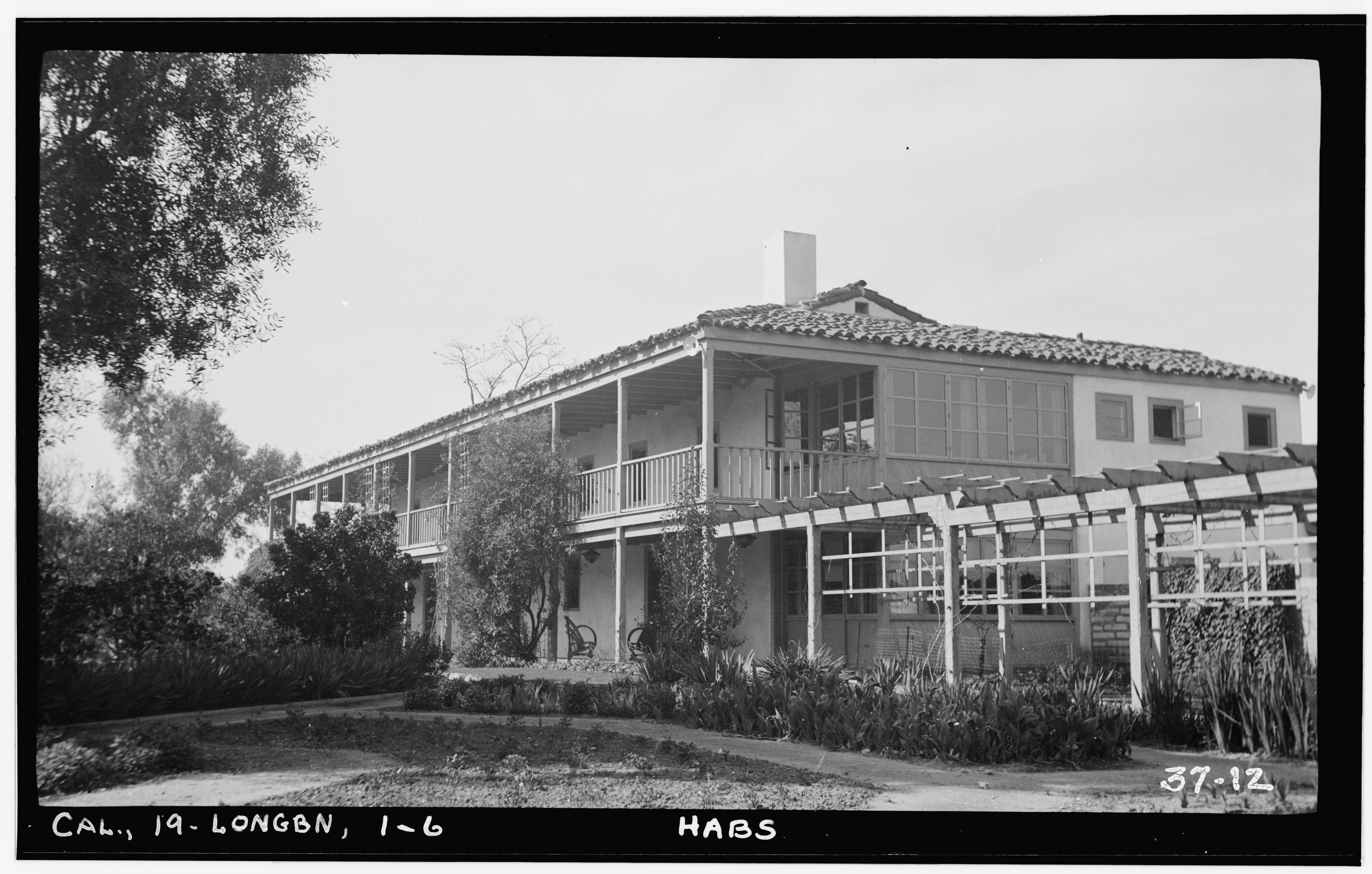
Los Cerritos Ranch House after restoration. Photo by Daniel Cathcart, March 8, 1934.

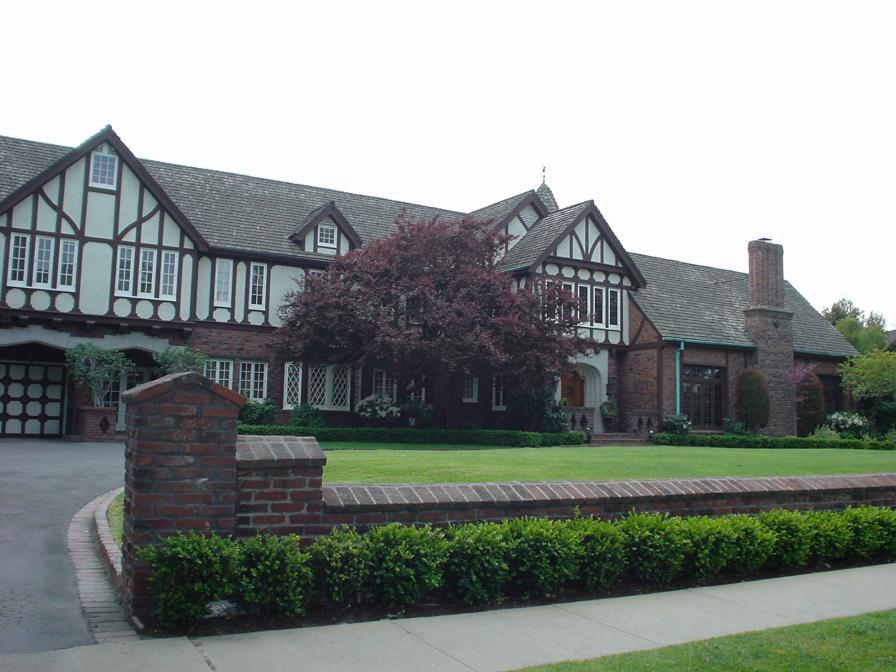
The Leonie Pray House, built for Signal Hill oilman William E. "Billy" Babb in 1927; Tudor Revival architecture by Clarence Aldrich. It appears in Not Another Teen Movie, Weird Science, and Donnie Darko.

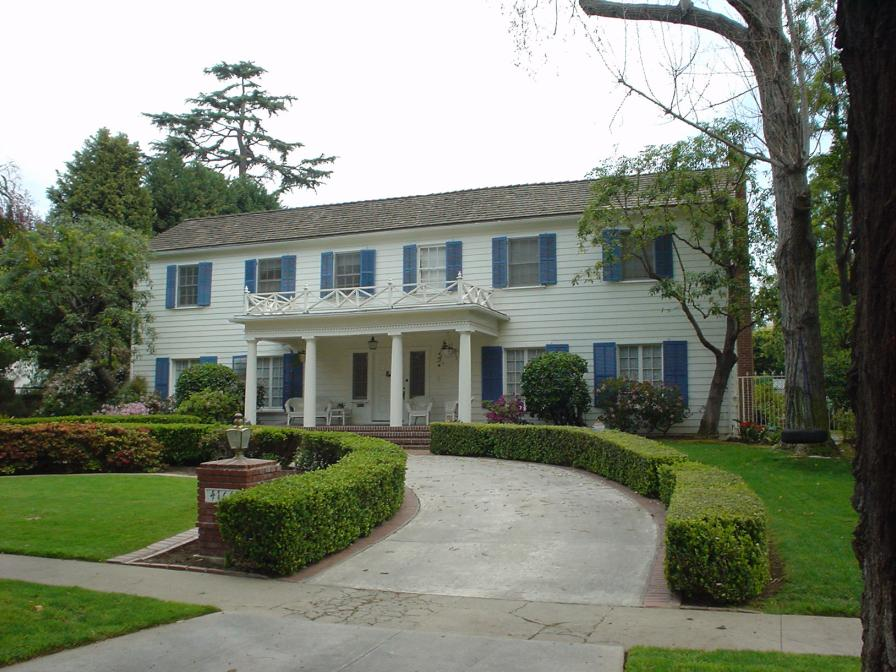
Northeast view of the Los Cerritos house used in the 1986 comedy film Ferris Bueller's Day Off as the Bueller family home. It also appears in Not Another Teen Movie and Red Dragon.

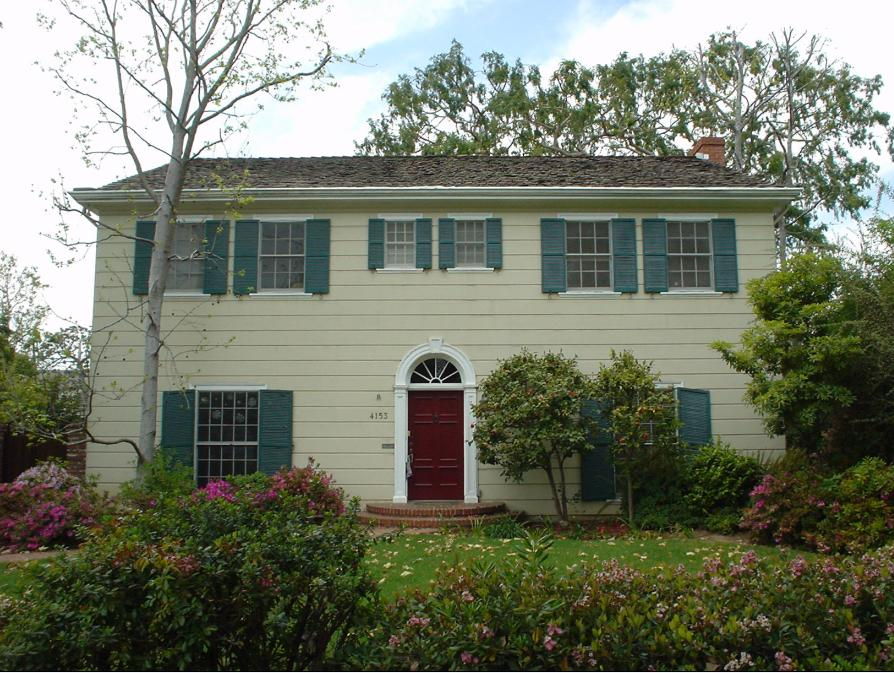
Appears in American Pie and American Pie 2

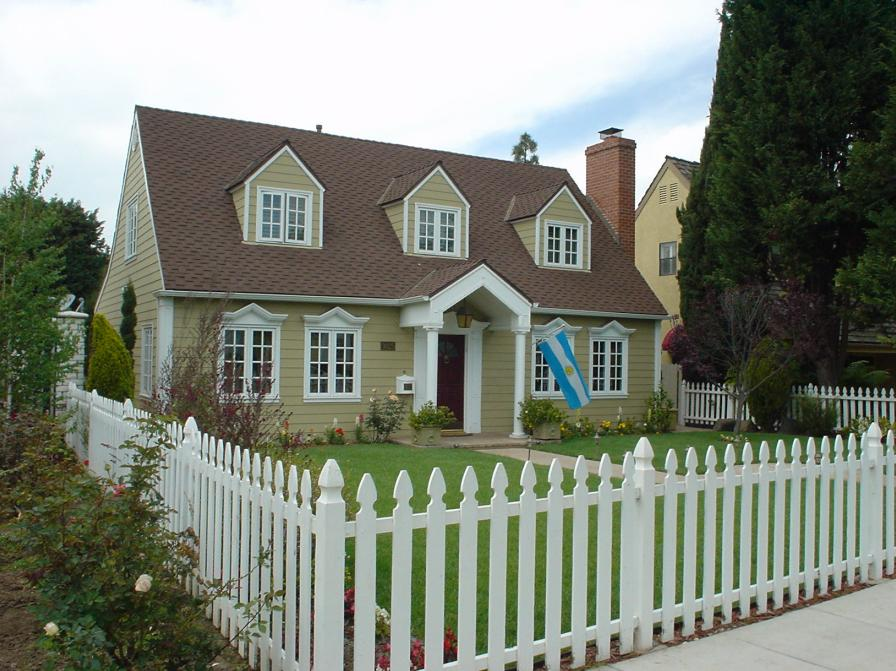
Appears in American Pie

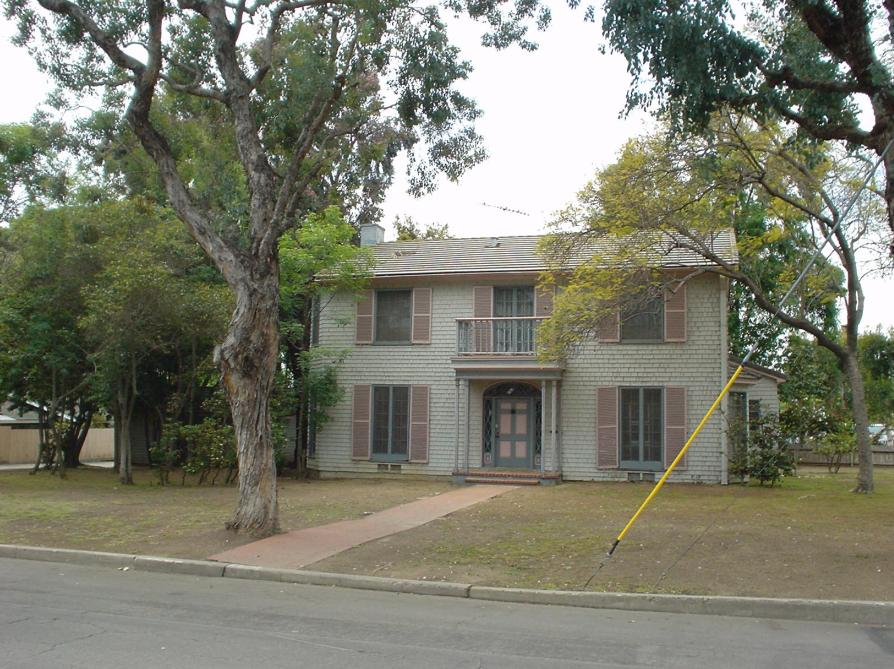
Appears in American Pie 2

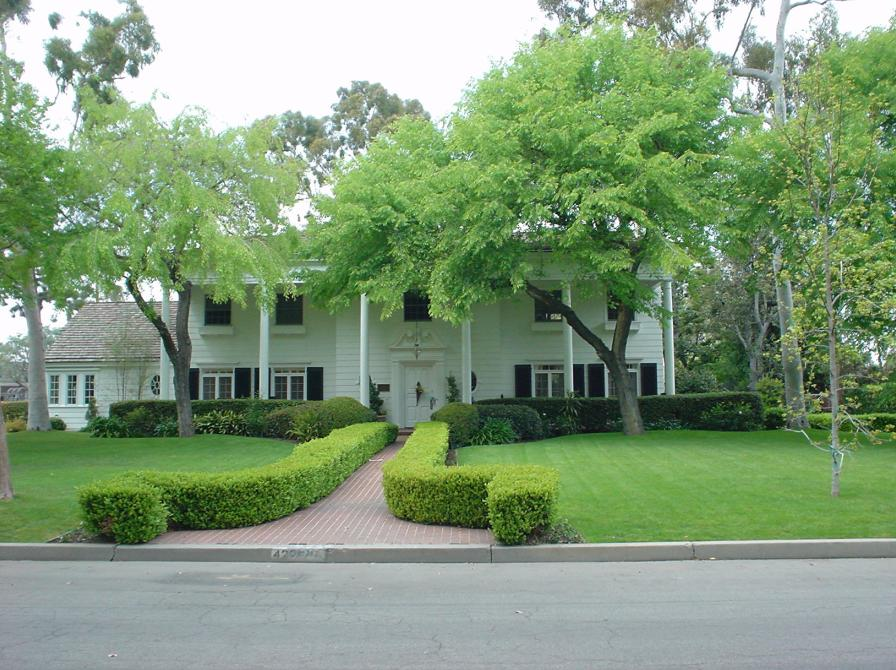
House by architect Hugh Gibbs, with addition by Edward Killingsworth. It appears in the film Donnie Darko, an episode of the drama Joan of Arcadia, and in an advertising campaign for the Honda Fit.

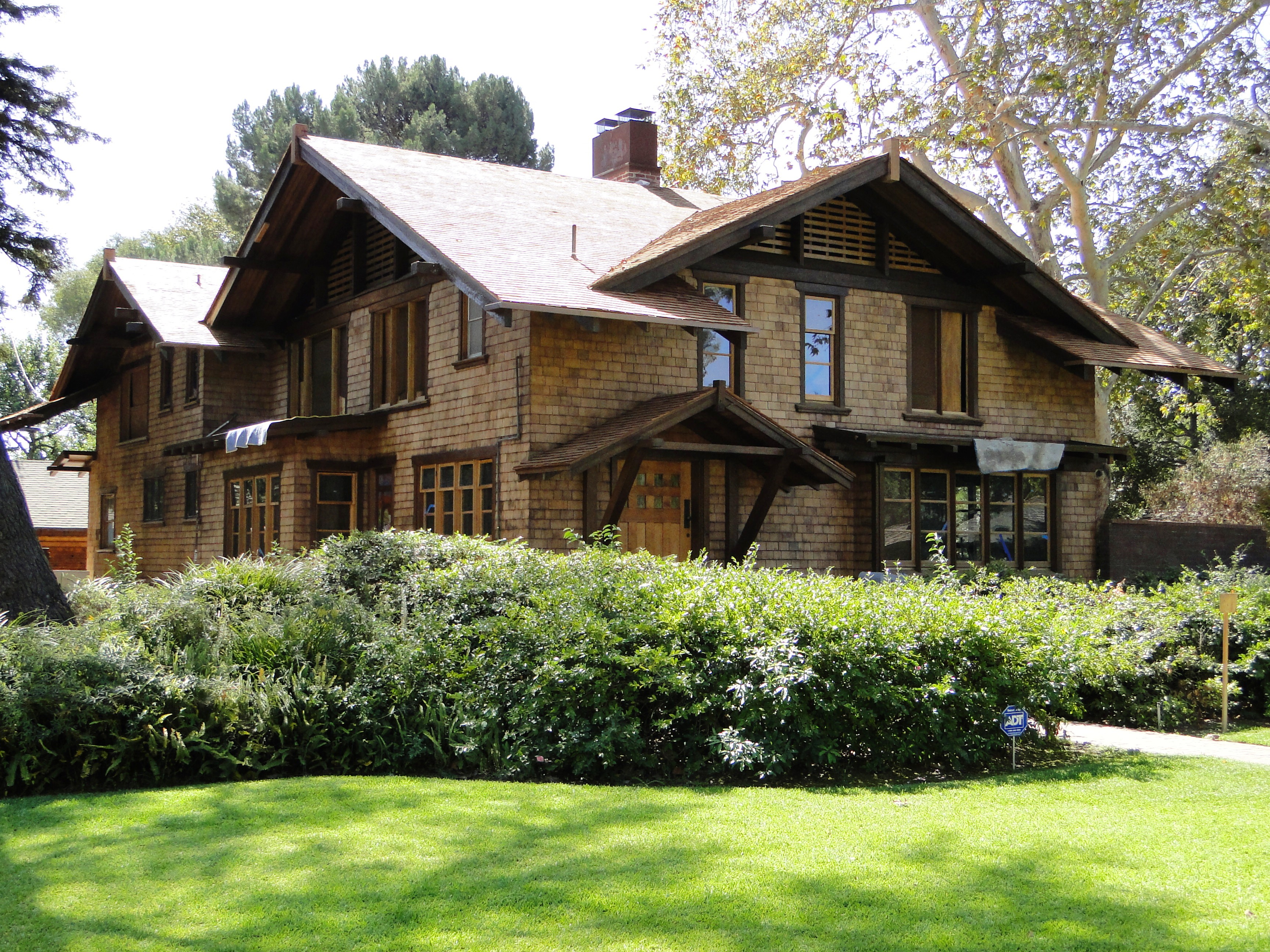
Jennie A. Reeve House, Greene and Greene, American Craftsman

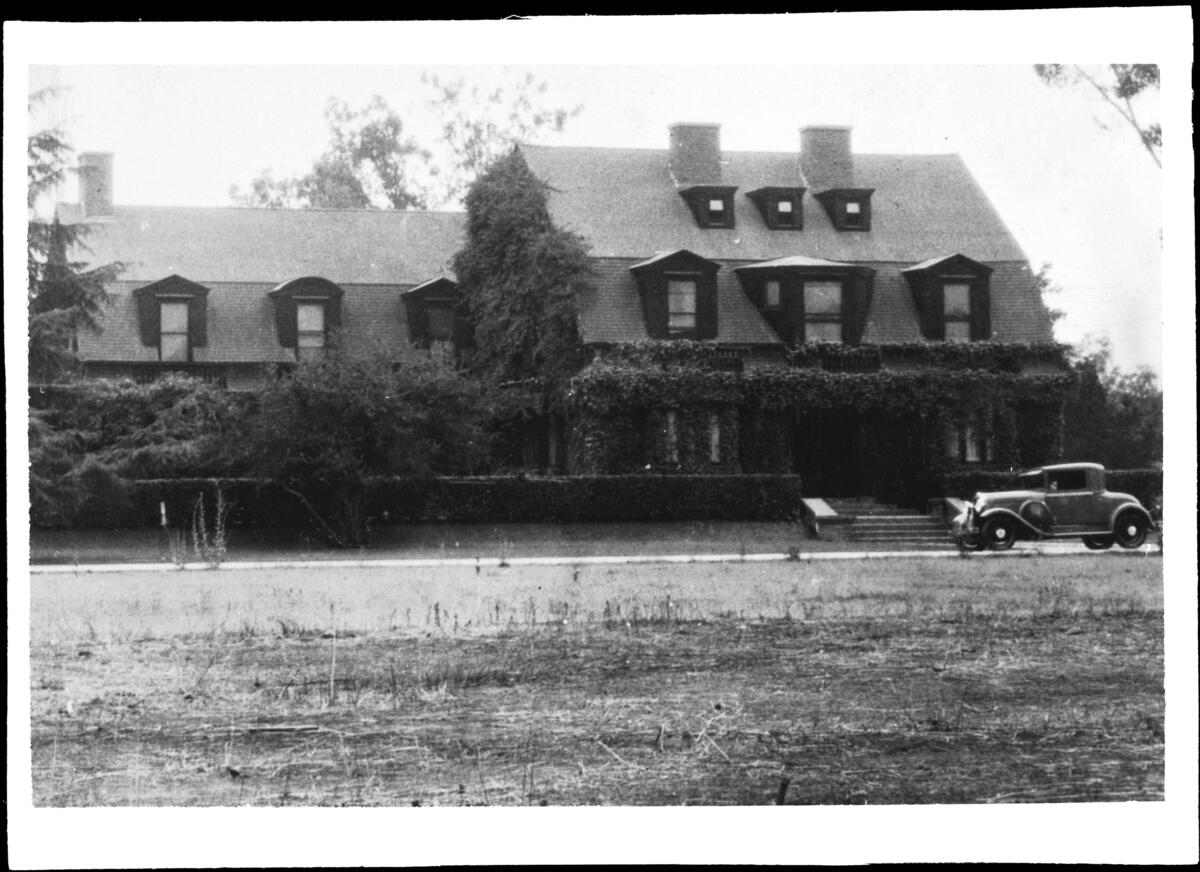
Bixby Ranch House; later, residence of Thomas and Belle Gilcrease

== See also ==
- Daugherty Field
- Rancho Los Cerritos
- Neighborhoods of Long Beach, California
