= Bixby land companies =

Group of California-based land companies

The Bixby land companies were a group of California-based land companies founded by various members of the Bixby and Flint families from Maine. In the late 19th and early 20th centuries, the firms of Flint, Bixby & Company, J. Bixby & Company, J. W. Bixby & Company, the Alamitos Land Company, and the Bixby Land Company controlled large swathes of California real estate, much of it derived from Mexican land grants. At various times their holdings included Rancho Los Cerritos, Rancho Los Alamitos, half of Rancho San Justo, and part of Rancho Palos Verdes together with other property in San Benito, Santa Barbara, and Los Angeles counties. Parts of the towns of Long Beach, Bellflower, Paramount, Signal Hill, Lakewood, and Los Alamitos emerged from former Bixby-held lands.

== History ==
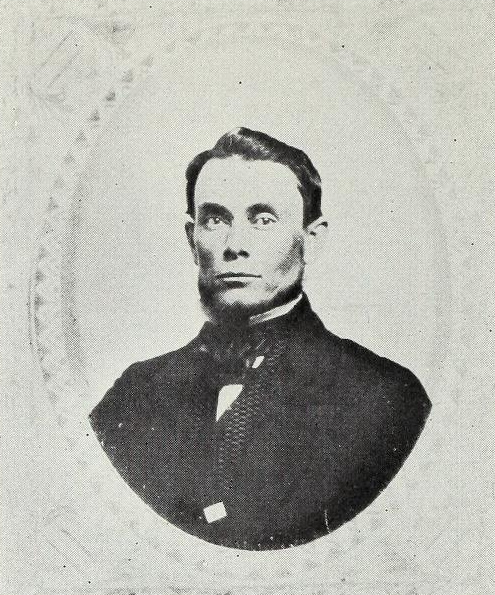
Thomas Flint

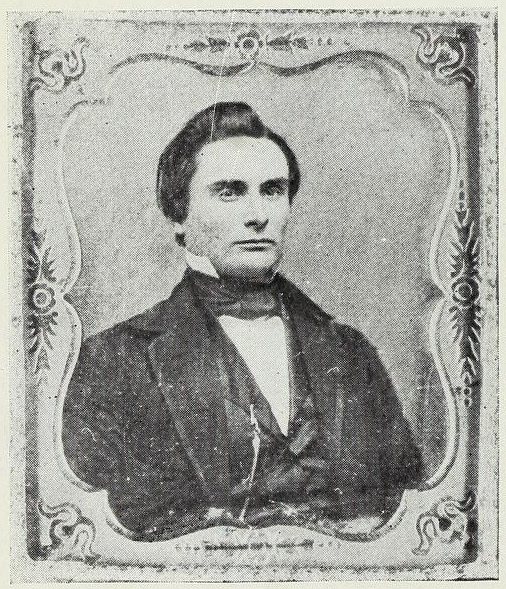
Benjamin Flint

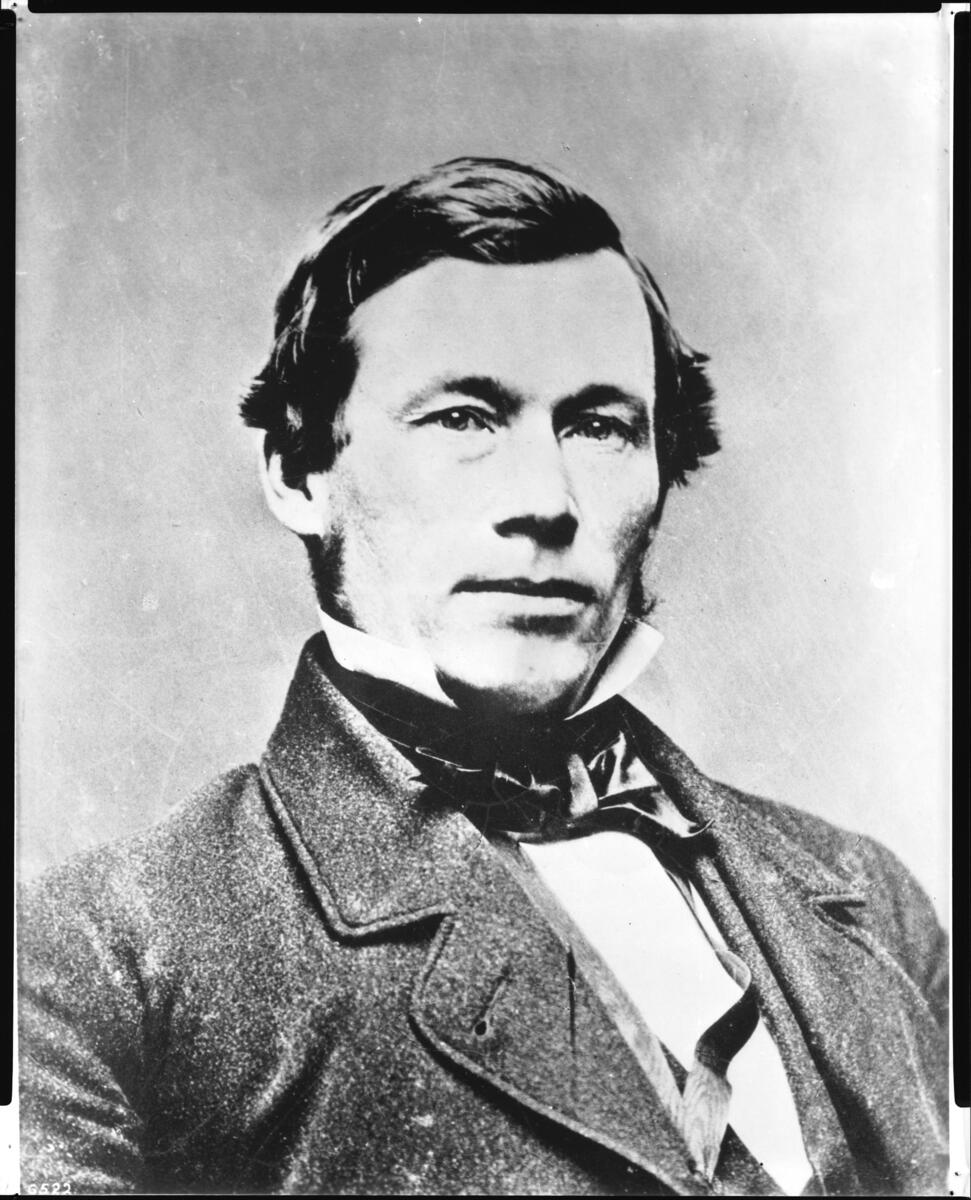
Llewellyn Bixby

The history of the land companies begins with the brothers Benjamin and Thomas Flint and their cousin Llewellyn Bixby, who left Maine for California in 1851, attracted by the Gold Rush. They turned from mining to ranching, and in 1852–53, the three cousins drove more than 2000 sheep from Ohio to California, the first step in what would become a highly successful ranching enterprise. Together with Llewellyn's brother Jotham they went into business as Flint, Bixby & Company.

In 1855, Flint, Bixby bought the 34,000-acre Rancho San Justo near what is now the town of Hollister in partnership with rancher William Welles Hollister. In 1858, the company bought the Hero-Huero Ranch near Paso Robles, and by 1859, they were running some 20,000 sheep on the ranches. The partnership with Hollister dissolved in 1861, with Flint, Bixby ultimately ending up with all the Rancho San Justo land west of the San Benito River.

The business especially prospered as a result of the high demand for meat and wool during the Civil War. In 1864, Flint, Bixby started acquiring land in southern California, beginning with the Rancho San Joaquin, Rancho Lomas de Santiago, and a section of Rancho Santiago de Santa Ana, with James Irvine (1827–1886) as a silent partner. These three contiguous parcels totaled over 100,000 acres. In the 1870s, Flint, Bixby sold these properties to Irvine.

In 1866 Flint, Bixby expanded further, buying the 27,000-acre Rancho Los Cerritos. Jotham was the manager of Rancho Los Cerritos and later bought a half interest in it through his own firm, J. Bixby & Company. By the 1870s, sheep ranching was in decline in southern California and Jotham Bixby began to sell off this land for development.

In the 1870s, another cousin, John William Bixby, bought a portion of Rancho Canon de Santa Ana and began leasing part of Rancho Los Alamitos. Sometime between 1881 and 1883 he bought Rancho Los Alamitos with two partners, J. Bixby & Company and Isaias W. Hellman, founder of the Farmers and Merchants Bank of Los Angeles. This three-way partnership operated as J. W. Bixby & Company. John managed the 29,000-acre ranch and lived there with his family.

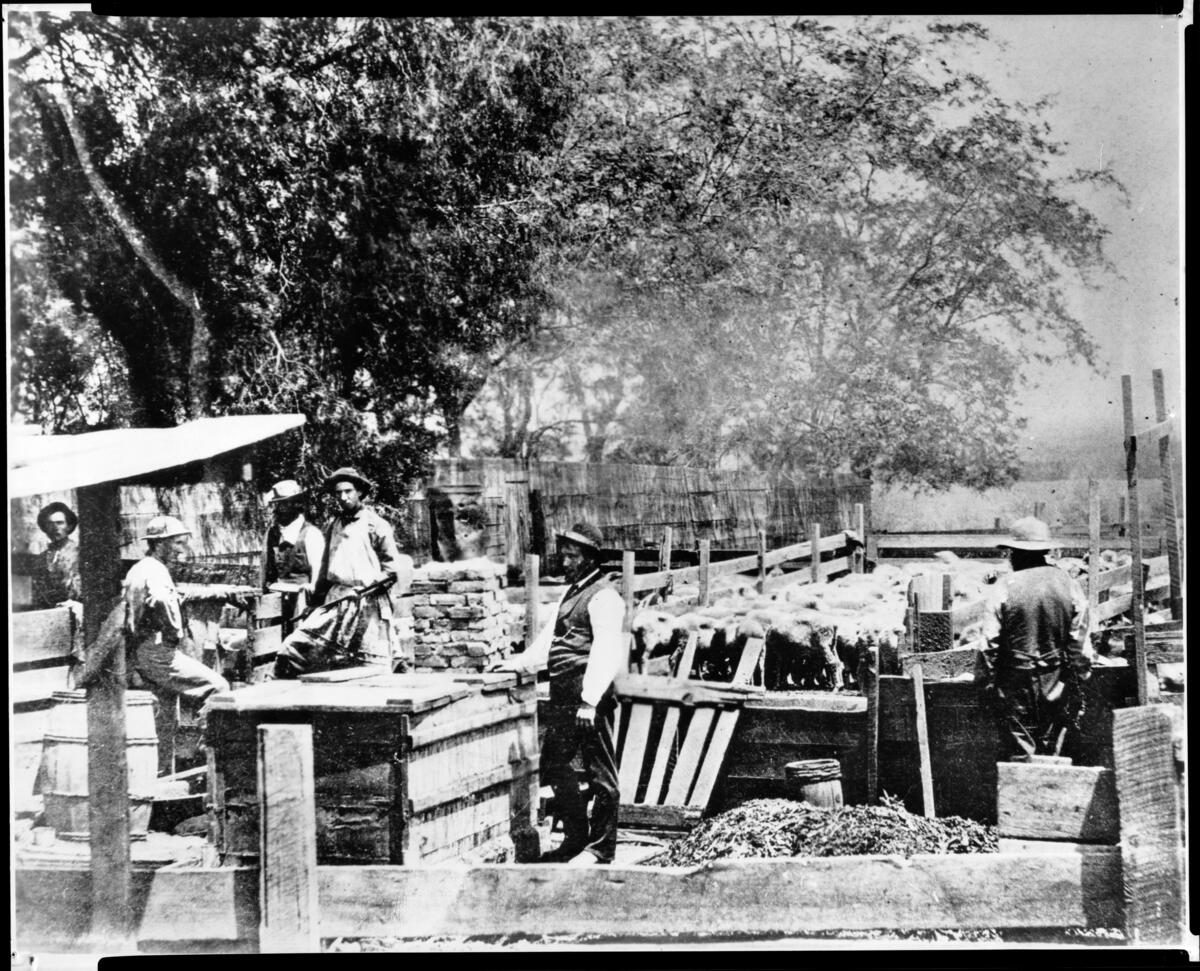
Sheep dipping at Bixby Ranch in Long Beach, California, c. 1901. The man pictured at center with the bowler hat and vest has been identified as Jotham Bixby.

John died suddenly of appendicitis in 1887, as a result of which Rancho Los Alamitos was divided into thirds in 1891. J. Bixby & Company got the acreage that adjoined Rancho Los Cerritos, and this later became the first holdings of yet another company, the Bixby Land Company, founded in 1896. Part of the Bixby Land Company property was a sugar beet farm that was later redeveloped into the city of Los Alamitos. The banker Hellman received a southeastern section that became a housing development, and John's family kept the rest.

When John died, he and his partners had already been planning to dissolve their partnership. While he was still alive, a new family-owned company was formed, the Alamitos Land Company, with an eye to developing a southwest part of the rancho property where it adjoined the city of Long Beach. The Alamitos Land Company eventually developed an area that included Signal Hill. The company existed until 2008.

In 1912, John's son Fred Bixby acquired Cojo Ranch, formerly part of Rancho Punta de la Concepcion in Santa Barbara County. He acquired the neighboring Jalama Ranch in 1937 and combined them to form the Jalama-Cojo Ranch, also known as the Bixby Ranch. The Bixby family sold the property in 2007.

== See also ==
- Bixby family
- Bixby Slough
- Bixby Marshland
