= Long Beach Police Department (California) =

Law enforcement agency in Long Beach, California

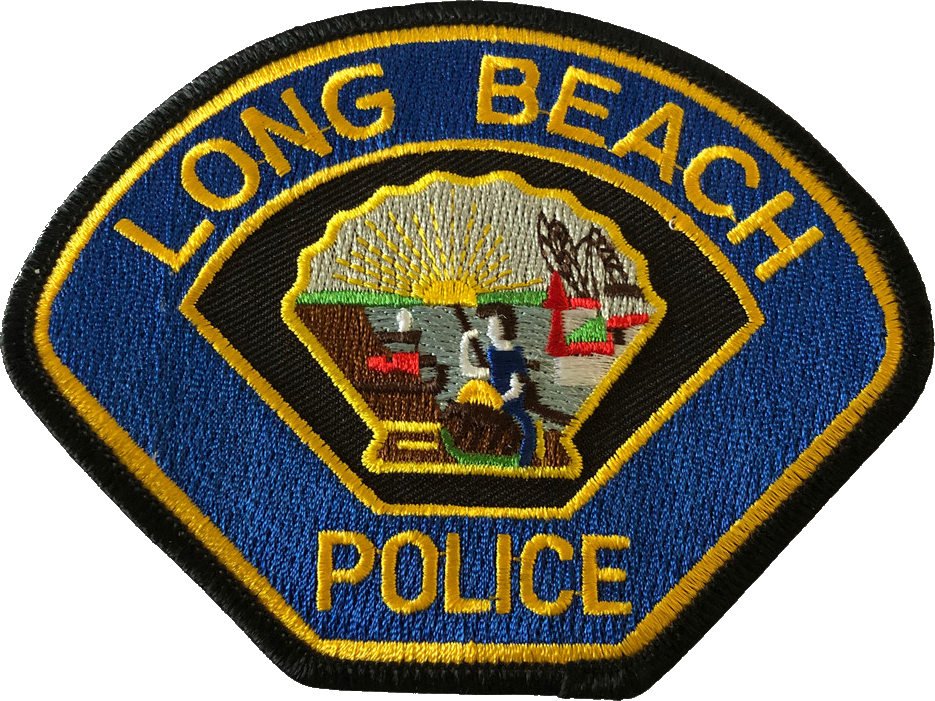
- Long Beach PD's patch

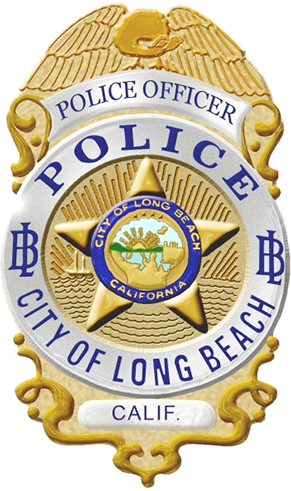
- Long Beach PD's Badge

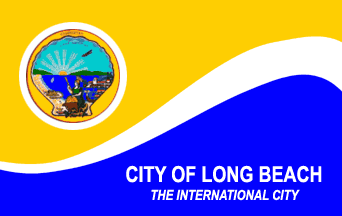
- Flag of Long Beach
- Abbreviation: LBPD

Agency overview
- Formed: January 30, 1888; 138 years ago
- Employees: 1,164 (2020)
- Annual budget: $264 million (2020)

Jurisdictional structure
- Operations jurisdiction: Long Beach, California, United States
- Area: 51.44 sq mi
- Population: 467,353 (2018)

Operational structure
- Headquarters: 400 W. Broadway Long Beach, CA 90802
- Sworn members: 624 (2024)
- Professional staffs: 389 (2022)
- Agency executive: Wally Hebeish, Chief of Police

Facilities
- Stations: 4
- Boats: 3
- Helicopters: 2

Website
- http://www.longbeach.gov/police/

The Long Beach Police Department provides law enforcement for the city of Long Beach, California.

== History ==
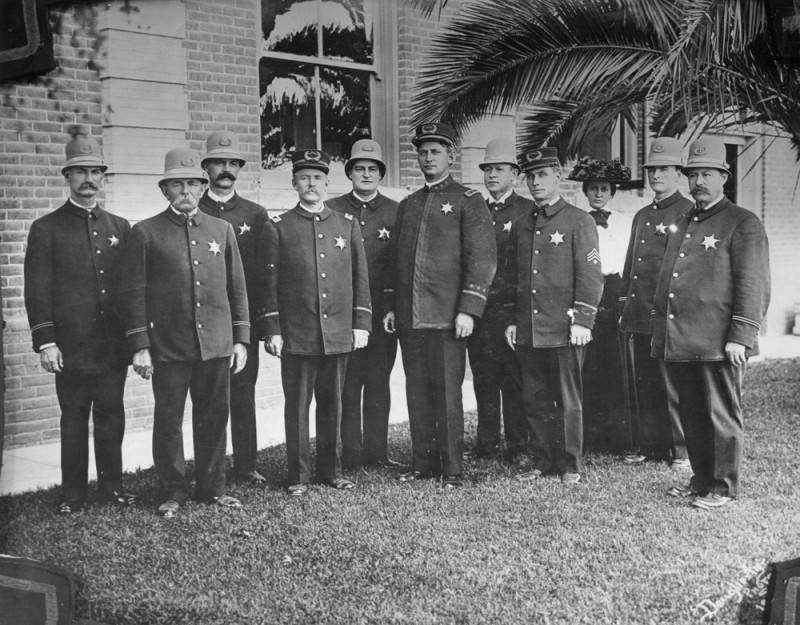
Long Beach Police Department, circa 1910. The captain (second from left); next to him is Police Chief Tom Williams; next to him is Sgt. Fred B. Kutz; third from right, Special Officer Fanny Bixby Spencer.

Map of the LBPD's reporting districts, divisions, and beats.

The Long Beach Police Department was founded January 30, 1888, on the day twenty-four-year-old Horatio Davies was elected as the city's first city marshal.

From January 1888 to January 1908, the city elected eight different men to serve as city marshal until the city council adopted Ordinance Number 3, New Series, doing away with the office of city marshal and allowing for the appointment of a chief of police. Thomas W. Williams was the first Long Beach chief of police. Fanny Bixby Spencer was sworn in as a special police matron on January 1, 1908, making her one of the first women police officers in the country.

The Long Beach Police Officers Association (LBPOA) was established on June 24, 1940. The Long Beach K-9 Officers Association (LBK9OA) was established in October 1982. The Long Beach Police Historical Society was founded in 1995. The Senior Police Partners program began in 1995.

The current Chief of Police is Wally Hebeish who replaced Robert Luna who served from 2014 to 2021. Luna resigned to run for Los Angeles County Sheriff, which he was elected in 2022.

Since the establishment of the Long Beach Police Department, 28 officers have died while on duty.

== Patrol divisions ==
=== North Patrol Division ===
The North Division has approximately 110 police officers and a dedicated civilian support staff. The current building was constructed in 2004. The building houses a rooftop 40-kilowatt solar power system and has the potential to supply 85% of needed power. The North Division business desk is staffed Tuesday through Friday, 12 p.m. to 5 p.m. and provides a variety of services.

Neighborhoods served include Bixby Knolls, California Heights, Los Cerritos and North Long Beach.

=== South Patrol Division ===
The South Patrol Division encompasses the area of Anaheim Street to Harbor Scenic Drive and the Los Angeles River to Cherry Avenue. Area attractions include: Long Beach Convention Center, Long Beach Arena, Queen Mary, Carnival Cruise Line Terminal, Shoreline Marina and a Downtown Entertainment District.

Neighborhoods served include Alamitos Beach, Downtown, East Village and Hellman.

The South Patrol Division is located in the Public Safety Building at 400 West Broadway.

=== East Patrol Division ===
The East Division Station opened in February 2016 and houses the East Patrol Division and Juvenile Investigations Section operations. East Division police officers provide law enforcement services to approximately 170,000 residents. Measured at 24 square miles, the East Division is the largest geographical patrol division of the police department and comprises approximately 46 percent of the city. It is bounded by Del Amo Boulevard to the north; the Pacific Ocean shoreline to the south; Orange County to the east; and, Cherry Avenue and the City of Signal Hill to the west.

The East Division is home to 4th Street "Retro Row," Bixby Park, California State University, Long Beach, the East Anaheim Street Corridor, the Long Beach Airport, Marina Pacifica, Rancho Los Alamitos Historic Ranch and Gardens, and Towne Center.

Neighborhoods served include Alamitos Heights, Belmont Heights, Belmont Park, Belmont Shore, Bluff Heights, Bluff Park, Carroll Park, El Dorado Park, Lakewood Village, Los Altos, Naples, Plaza, Rose Park, and Zaferia.

=== West Patrol Division ===
The West Patrol Division is almost 13 square miles and includes the Port of Long Beach, the area west of the 710 Freeway, and a large portion of Central Long Beach. The 136 sworn and three civilian employees serve almost 100,000 people. Officers respond to over 40,000 dispatches each year. The West Patrol Substation opened in late 1997. The substation's presence in the area has improved community access to police. Each divisional station provides information and limited police reporting services.

Neighborhoods served include Sunrise, West Long Beach and Wrigley.

=== Field support division ===
Field Support consists of over 200 sworn and civilian personnel.

== See also ==
- Neighborhoods of Long Beach, California
