= A. Contini & Son =

American plaster mold casting firm

- Founder: Attilio Contini; Cesare Contini
- Headquarters: New York, New York, United States
- Area served: International
- Products: Plaster mold casting

A. Contini & Son (also known as A. J. Contini & Son) was a fine art plaster mold casting firm founded by Italian American Attilio Contini and his son Cesare. Based in New York, New York, United States, A. Contini & Son made plaster molds for sculptors around the world including James Earle Fraser, Ivan Meštrović, Herbert Haseltine, A. Stirling Calder, Adolph Weinman, among others. It was the first casting facility of its kind in the United States.

== History ==
Attilio Contini (1884-1960) founded A. Contini & Son. Contini's father was Augusto Contini, a caster who worked for the Vatican. Attilio Contini was credited with bringing Italian-style casting to the United States in the 1890s. The studio was located on East 12th Street in New York City.

The firm worked with many notable public art sculptures including works by James Earle Fraser who worked closely with Attilio in the 1920s to create The End of the Trail. Cesare would later restore and create the molds for a re-installation of The End of the Trail at the National Cowboy & Western Heritage Museum.

=== Victor M. Contini ===
Victor Contini learned casting and molding as child, apprenticing under his father at the family's studio. Contini served in World War II and participated in the Invasion of Normandy. When he returned, he worked for his father, but had to get a job at Republic Aviation as a result in a decline in demand for monuments and cheaper casting options being available. He worked at the family firm when called by his brother Cesare Contini, who ran the company after the death of Atillio and until his own death in 1989.

His most notable casting works were Georg J. Lober's Hans Christian Andersen and Paul Manship's Prometheus, both in New York City]. Other notable works of Victor Contini's include Rocket Thrower and The Lone Sailor. Victor Contini lived in Esopus, New York. He died September 10, 1995, at Vassar Brothers Medical Center of complications from a stroke.

== Gallery of works molded by A. Contini & Son ==
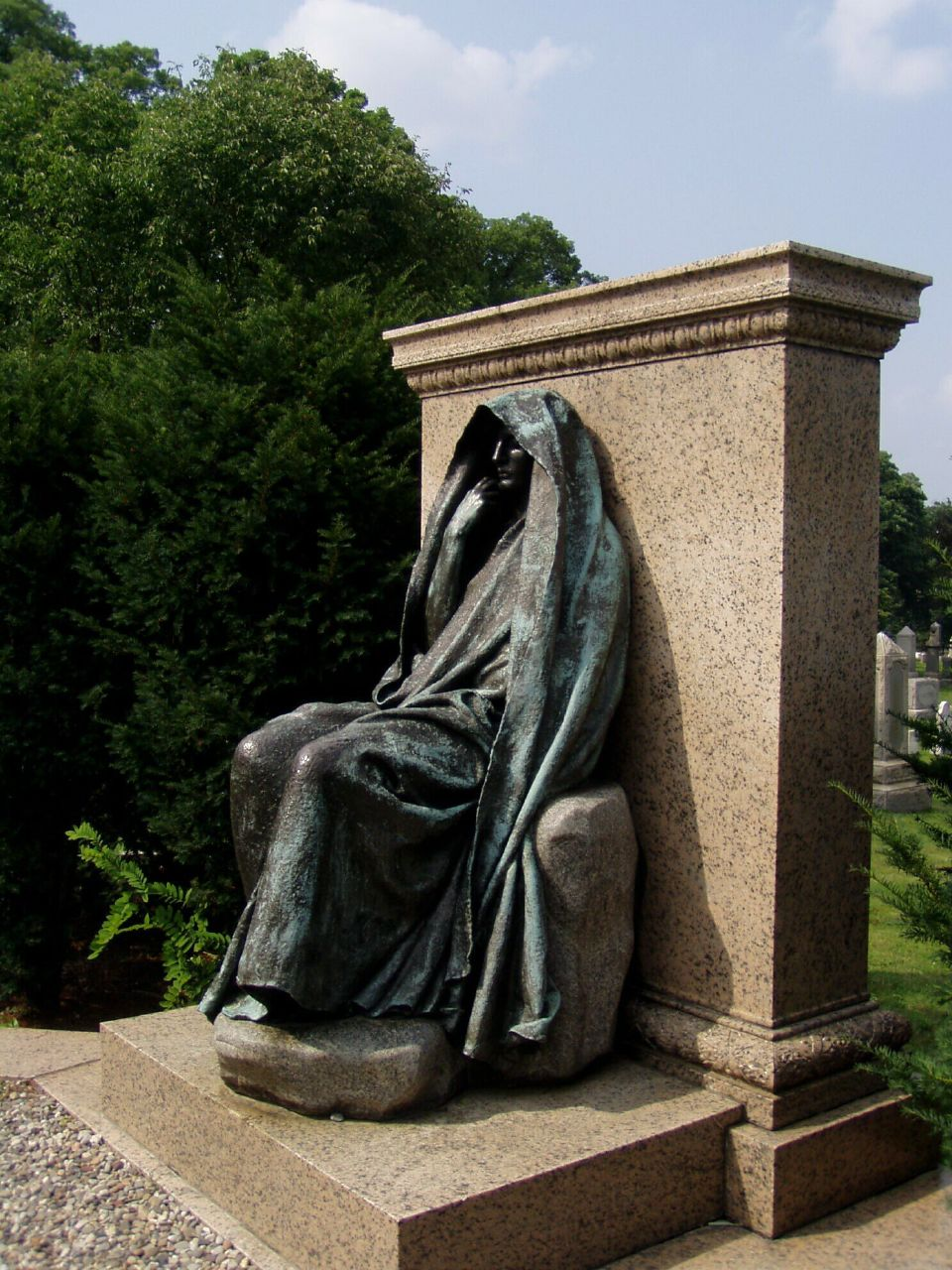
Adams Memorial by Augustus Saint-Gaudens

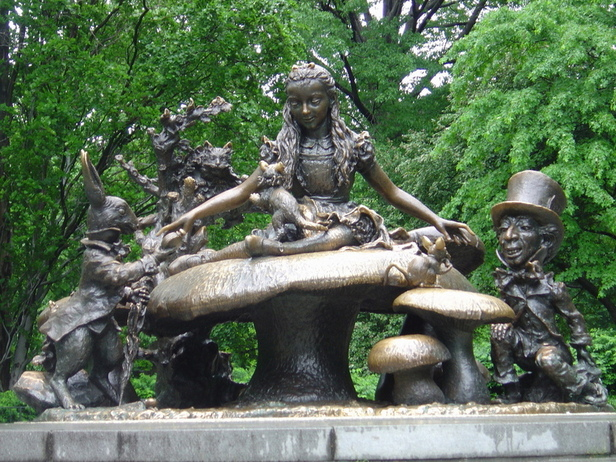
Alice in Wonderland by Paul Manship

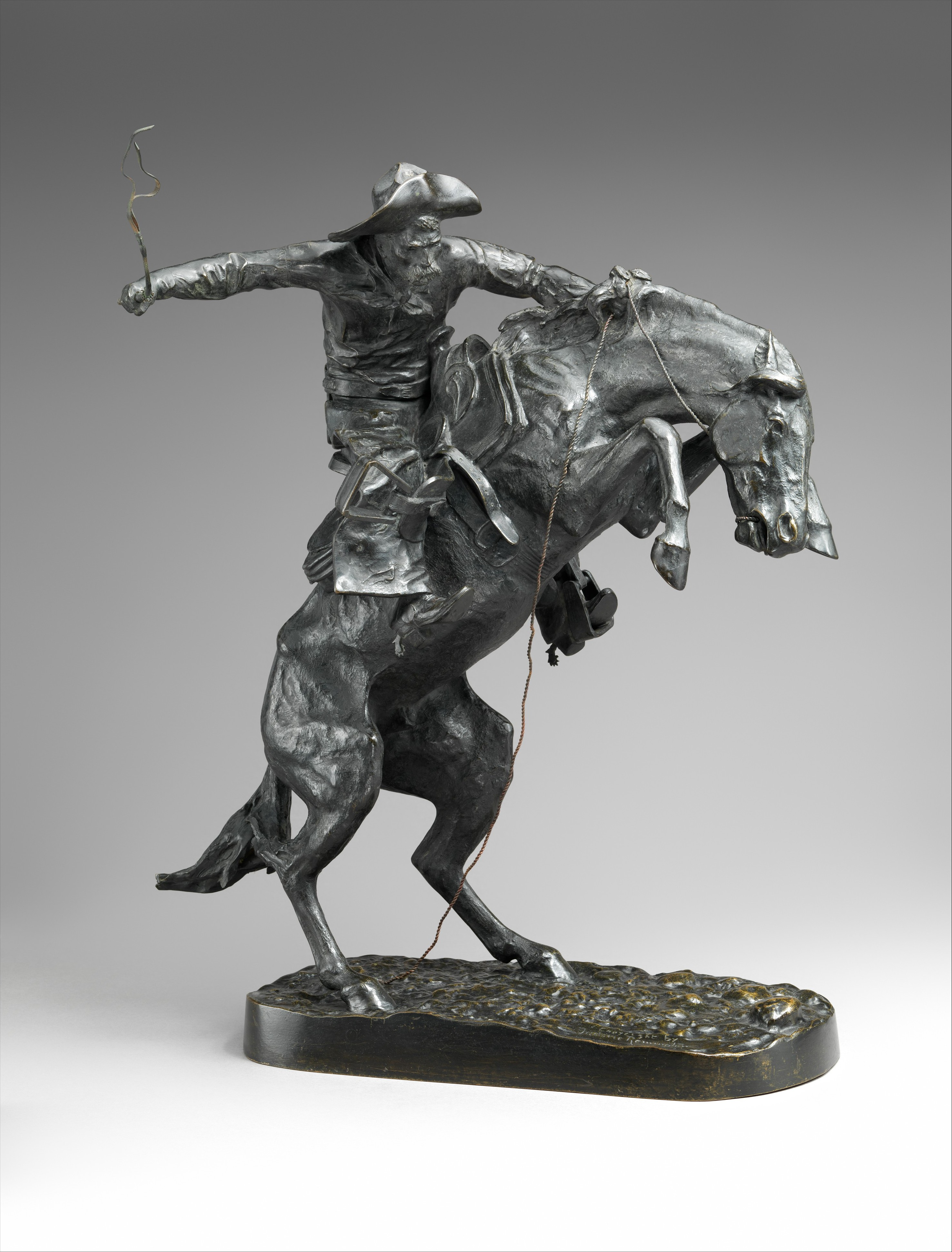
The Bronco Buster by Frederic Remington

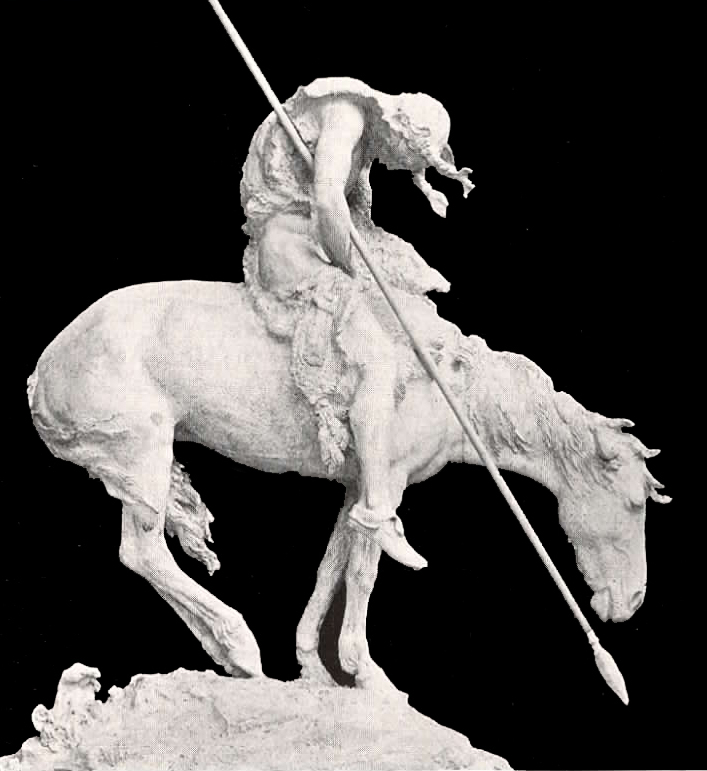
The End of the Trail by James Earle Fraser

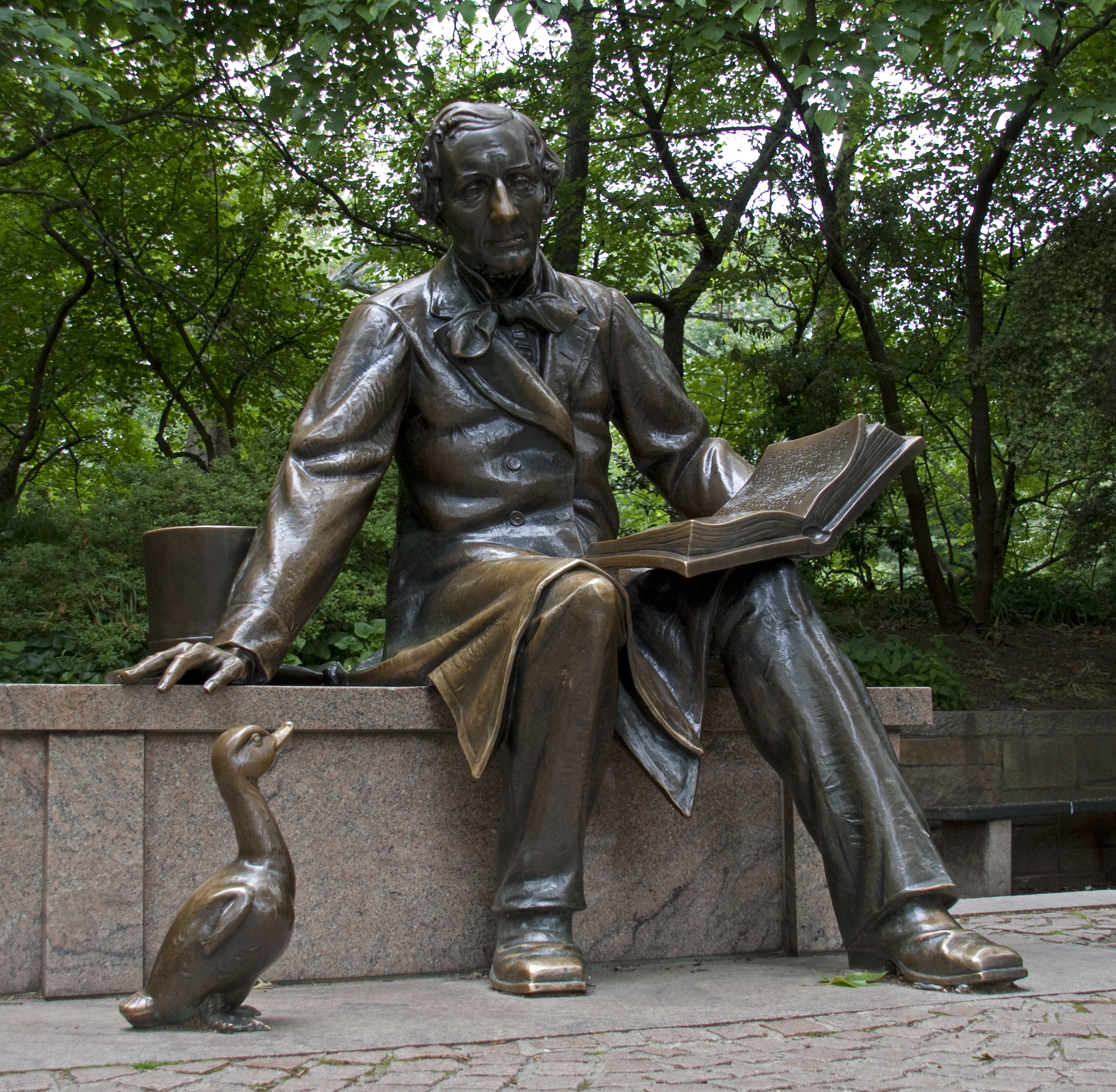
Hans Christian Andersen by Georg John Lober

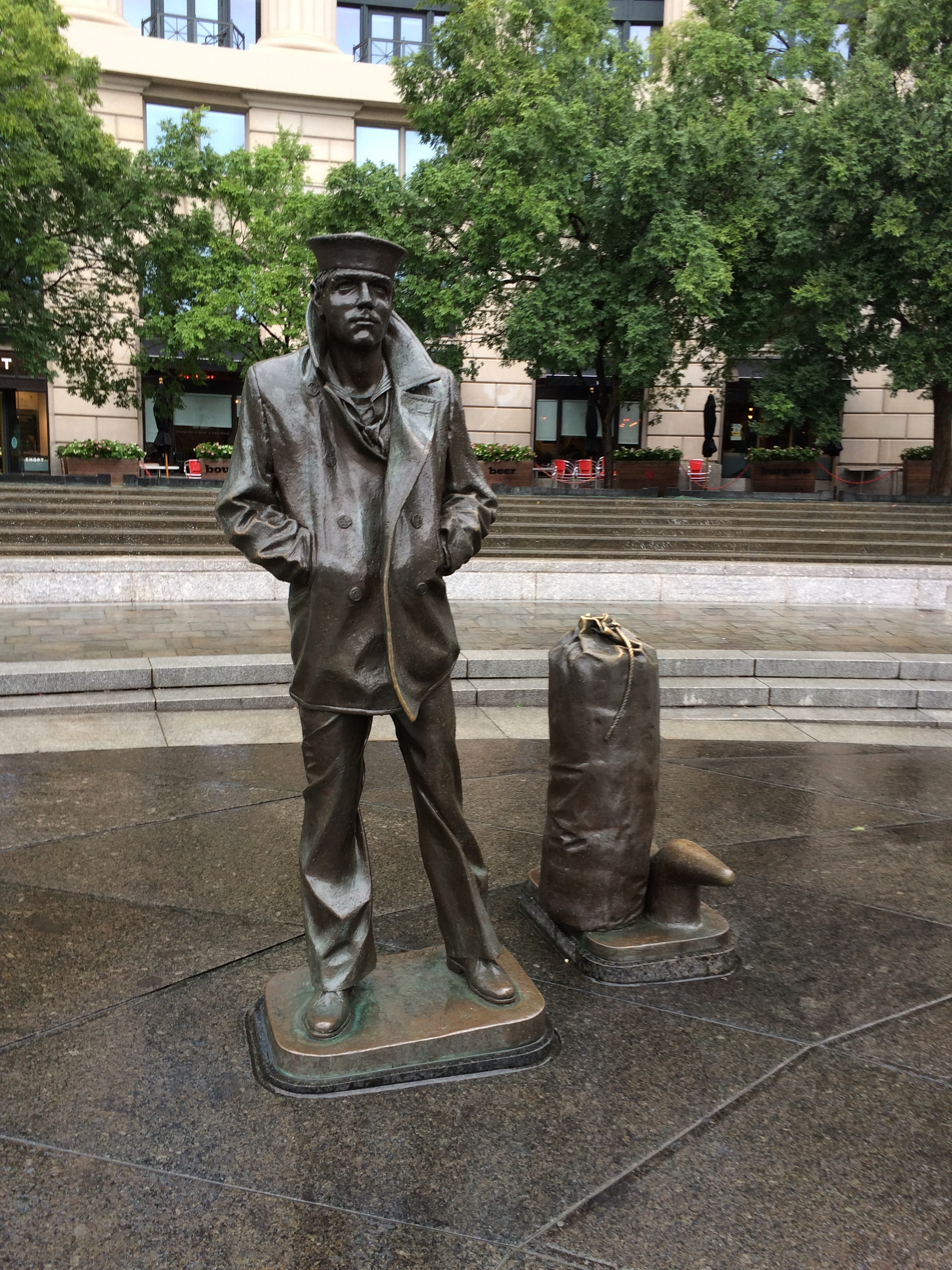
The Lone Sailor by Stanley Bleifeld

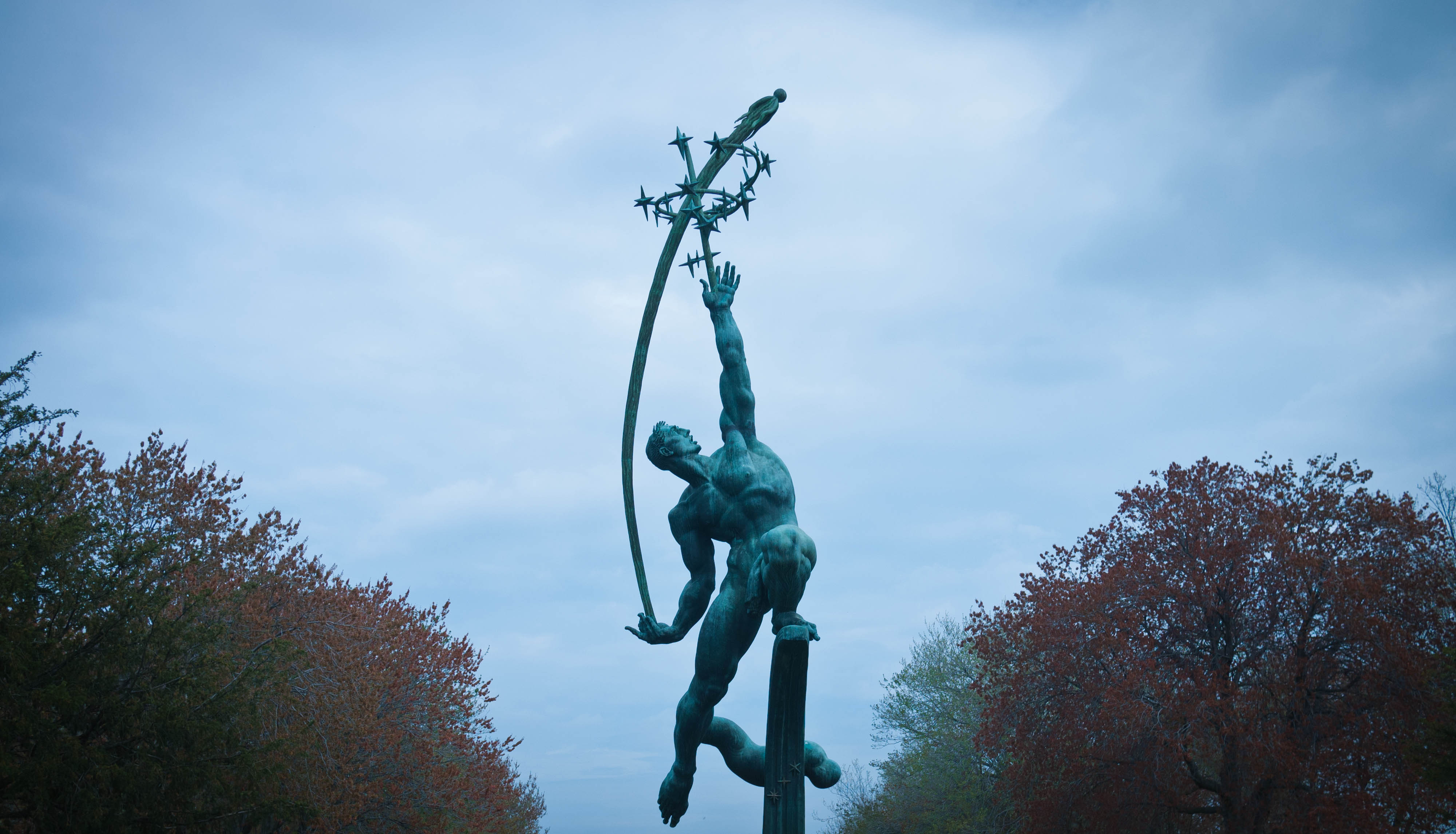
Rocket Thrower by Donald De Lue

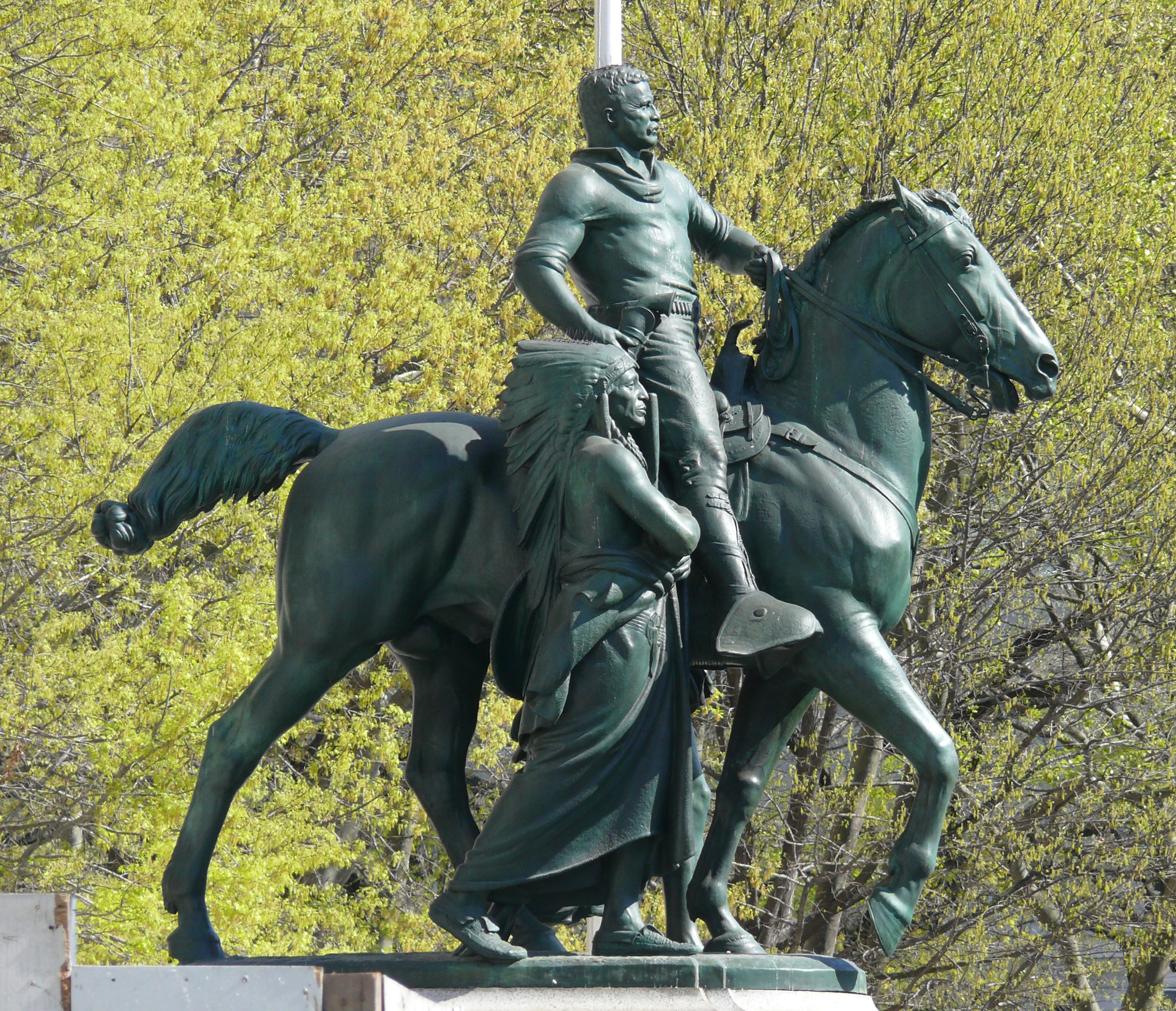
Theodore Roosevelt by James Earle Fraser

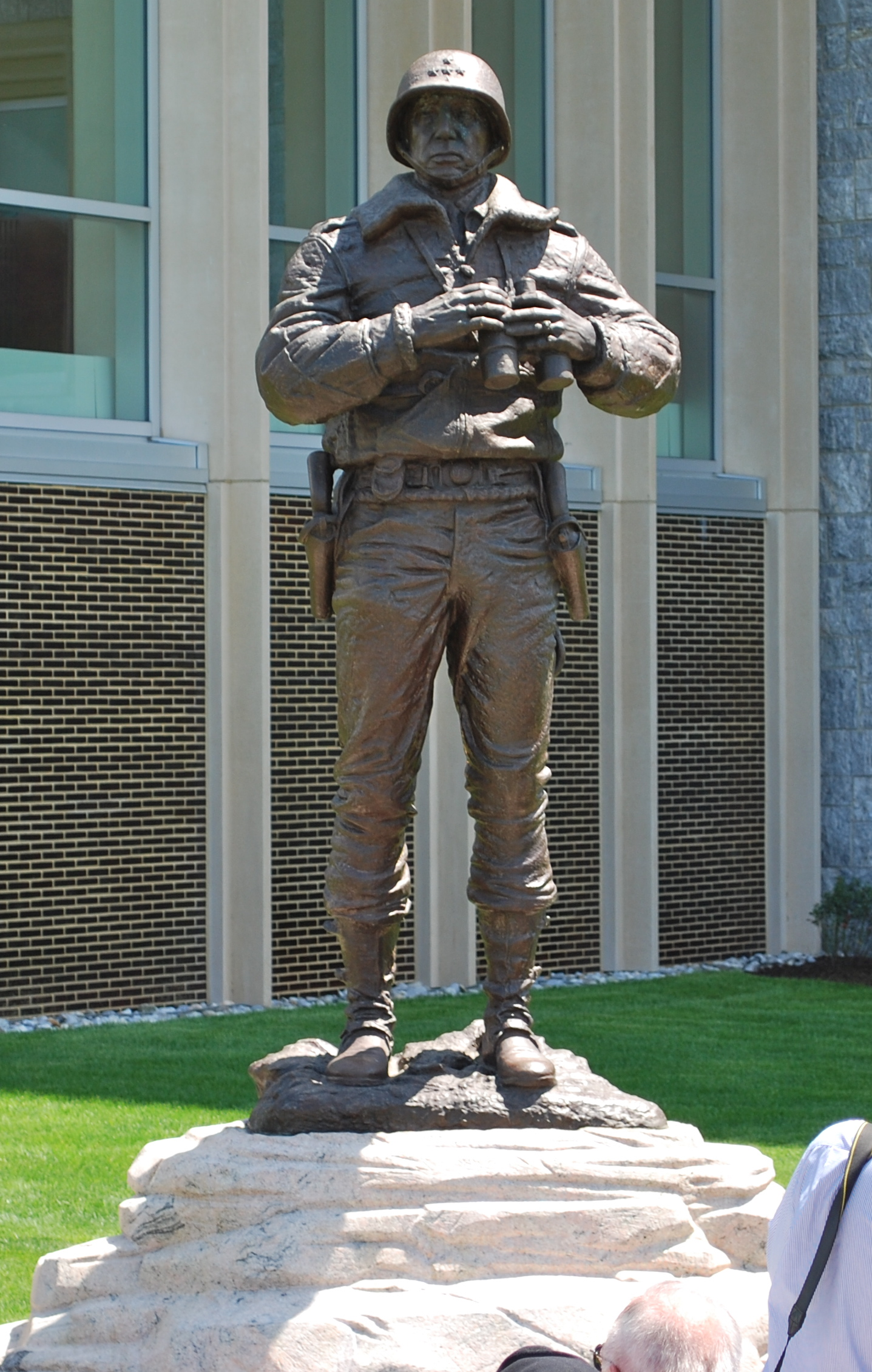
George S. Patton by James Earl Fraser

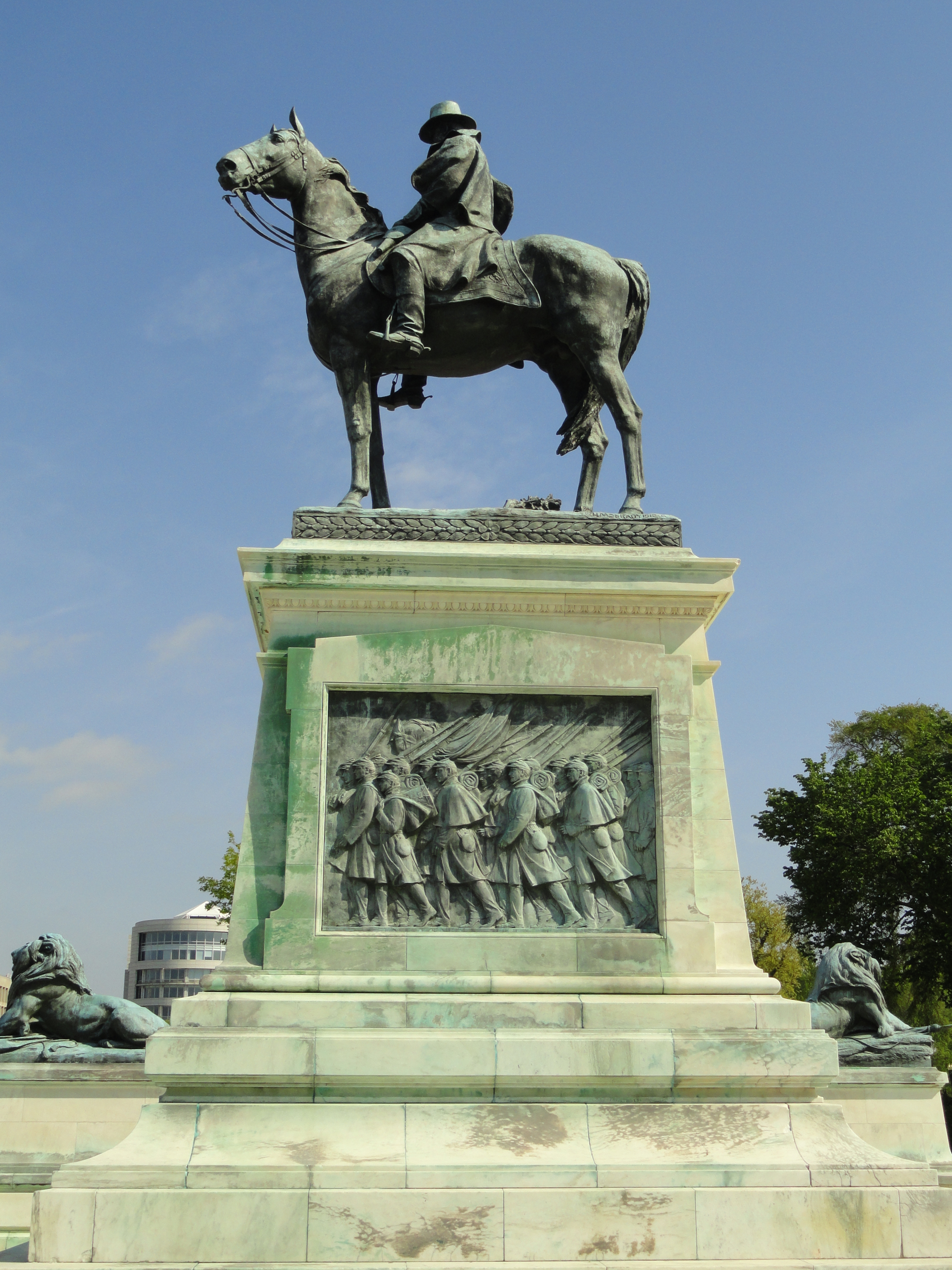
Ulysses S. Grant Memorial by Henry Shrady
