= The Homecoming (statue) =

Public sculpture in Washington, D.C.

Coordinates: 36°50′46.7″N 76°17′39.2″W

The Homecoming is a statue expressing the joy of reunion between a family when the sailor returns from a long period at sea. The statue honors the sacrifices made by families and members of all the sea services during long separations.

The Homecoming was sculpted by Stanley Bleifeld, who also created the well known The Lone Sailor. The original work is located in the United States Navy Memorial, in Washington, DC. There are full sized copies in Town Point Park, Norfolk, Virginia; Riverfront Park, North Charleston, South Carolina; and Tuna Harbor Park, San Diego, California.
