= 4th Street Corridor =

Neighborhood in Long Beach, California, US

4th Street Corridor Retro Row, Funky Fourth Street
- Neighborhood of Long Beach
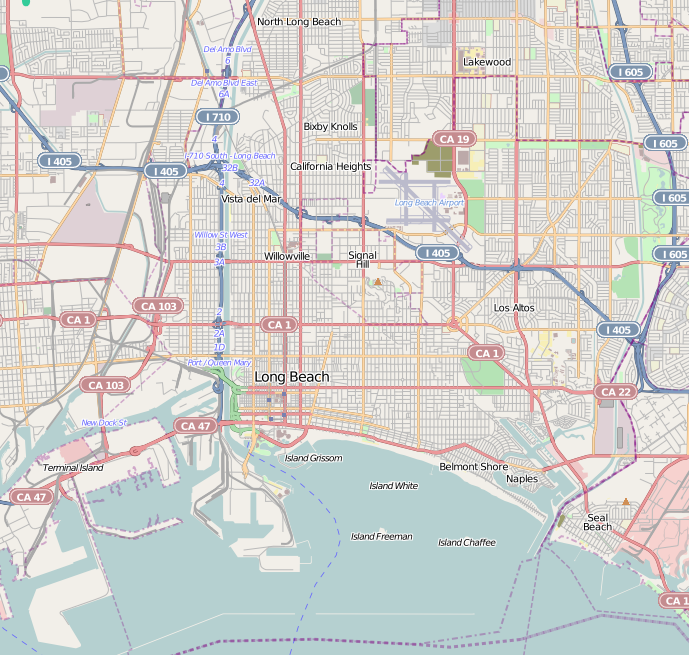
- Location within Long Beach
- Coordinates: 33.7717°N 118.1682°W
- Country: United States
- State: California
- County: Los Angeles
- City: Long Beach

The 4th Street Corridor, also known as Retro Row, is a small business district in the city of Long Beach, California, along 4th Street from Walnut Avenue to Temple Avenue.

Located east of Downtown Long Beach, this section of streets is the place for Long Beach visitors who enjoy vintage and kitschy shopping. Furniture and clothing from bygone eras is available in good condition at antique and used clothing stores. There are also a number of bars and restaurants.

== Location ==
The 4th Street Corridor, roughly centered on Cherry Avenue, passes between several neighborhoods: Alamitos Beach is to the south, North Alamitos Beach to the north-west, with Rose Park South on the north-east. Carroll Park and Bluff Heights extend to the south-east end of the business district.

== Attractions and characteristics ==
4th Street is a unique showcase of Long Beach culture, with a collection of independent local businesses. Portfolio Coffeehouse has served as the street's de facto anchor since its establishment in September 1990, when it became the first coffeehouse in Long Beach to present poetry readings. 4th Street also features vintage clothing boutiques, antique furniture stores, restaurants, and coffee shops, including the Assistance League Thrift & Vintage Shop.

4th Street is home to The Art Theatre, the oldest operating single screen house in Long Beach. The Art Theatre originally opened in 1924 as The Carter Theatre with 636 seats, an orchestra pit and pipe organ. It was constructed in a modest vernacular style with "orientalizing" touches reminiscent of Grauman's Chinese Theatre in Hollywood. Two storefronts flanked the theater. In 1934, the theater was remodeled in Art Deco Streamline Moderne style by Schilling & Schilling after the 1933 Long Beach earthquake and renamed The Lee Theatre. Additions included the ticket booth, terrazzo floor and zigzag elements like the stepped piers, vertical fluting, and the central-stepped vertical tower that unfolds as a fern. This tower has also been likened to the bow of a ship cutting through the water. In 1947, the theatre was remodeled again with a larger marquee and renamed The Art Theatre. In 2008, the theater was updated using the original blueprints, but with new interior, new sound and vision upgrades and restored exterior including a replica of the 1934 marquee and art deco trademark symmetrical storefronts. Named Retro-Row by Christopher Reece in his Antique & Retro Shoppers Map, a guide to So. Calif. antiques shopping.
