= Why'd You Stop Me? =

American nonprofit organisation

- Company type: Nonprofit organization
- Founded: 2014
- Founder: Jason Lehman
- Website: www.wysm.org

Why'd You Stop Me? (sometimes written as WYSM) is an American nonprofit organization with a stated goal of decreasing acts of violence between police and the public. It conducts programs to dispel misconceptions about police as well as train officers to better understand community issues. It also teaches leaderships skills needed to deal with authority figures in one's life.

== History ==
The organization was founded in 2014 by Jason Lehman, a police officer in Long Beach, California. He attended the University of South Florida where he played Division I college football and graduated with a bachelor's degrees in interpersonal communication and criminology. At the age of 13, Lehman was in trouble with the law which gave him a negative view of the police. It was after college and working for the Los Angeles County Fire Department that he decided to become a police officer, being hired by the Long Beach Police Department in 2006.

Lehman came up with the idea for the organization in 2011 after speaking to students at Long Beach Polytechnic High School following threats of violence against police officers in the area. Lehman was presented with real issues faced by students including fear of the police. After realizing the importance of education both law enforcement officials and the community on communicating issues from both sides, he officially Why'd You Stop Me? as a nonprofit organization in 2014.

Why'd You Stop Me? was initially funded by Lehman with more than $100,000 of his own money to help launch the program. The organization began primarily in the Long Beach area, but began teaching its program outside of California as early as 2015.

== Programs ==
Why'd You Stop Me? focuses on training programs to dispel misconceptions about police as well as train officers to better understand community issues. WYSM employs police officers and community members who have personal experiences with police officers or crime, including former gang members turned community advocates. Its message is based on its motto that "EVENT" plus the "REACTION" to the event equals the "OUTCOME" (E+R=O), an equation that teaches people to react positively to events in order to have a positive outcome and in turn reduce violence.

WYSM also provides two annual $1,000 scholarships to high school students of the Long Beach Unified School District who have successfully completed the WYSM program.
