= Contini =

Contini is an Italian surname that may refer to

- Alberto Contini, Italian musician
- Alfio Contini (1927–2020), Italian cinematographer
- Alessandro Contini-Bonacossi (1878–1955), Italian politician, art collector, dealer and philatelist
- Barbara Contini (born 1961), Italian politician
- Carl Contini (born 1970), birth name Carl Ognibene, best known as Carl Malenko, American professional wrestler, and MMA artist
- Edoardo Contini (born 1955), Italian mafia boss
- Ellen Contini-Morava, American anthropological linguist
- Gavino Contini (1860–1915), Sardinian poet
- Gianfranco Contini (1912–1990), Italian academic and philologist
- Giorgio Contini (born 1974), Swiss footballer
- Giovanni Battista Contini (1641–1723), Italian architect
- Joe Contini (born 1957), Canadian ice hockey forward
- Lucia Contini Anselmi (1876– after 1913), Italian pianist and composer
- Marcelo Contini (born 1989), Brazilian judoka
- Matteo Contini (born 1980), Italian football defender
- Michel Contini (1937), Sardinian, naturalized French linguist, researcher and academic
- Nikita Contini Baranovsky (born 1996), Italian footballer
- Sabine Contini (born c. 1970), Italian figure skater
- Silvano Contini (born 1958), Italian road bicycle race

== See also ==
- Contini clan
- A. Contini & Son
