= Plaster casting =

Plaster casting may refer to:

- Plaster cast
- Plaster mold casting, a metalworking process that uses plaster as the mold material
