= Wisconsin Square =

Park in Norfolk, Virginia, United States

Coordinates: 36°50′55.9″N 76°17′39.5″W

Wisconsin Square is a small park on Norfolk, Virginia's Elizabeth River waterfront, opposite the berth of the berth of the USS Wisconsin, a museum ship. It contains memorials to the seamen lost while serving on United States Navy ships homeported in Norfolk.

It also contains the ship's bell of USS Norfolk (DL-1) and a copy of The Lone Sailor.

== Memorials ==
Wisconsin Square contains memorials to fallen US Navy personnel that were home ported in Norfolk.

- USS Kearsarge (CV-33), 30 sailors lost in 1948
- USS Forrestal (CV-59), for those lost in the 1967 USS Forrestal fire
- USS Liberty (AGTR-5), for those killed in the 1967 USS Liberty incident
- USS Scorpion (SSN-589), lost with all hands in 1968
- USS Newport News (CA-148), for crew lost in a 1972 misfire
- USS Nimitz (CVN-68), for the crew lost in the 1981 flight deck crash
- USS Iowa (BB-61), for the crew lost in the 1989 turret explosion
- USS Cole (DDG-67), for the crew lost in the 2000 suicide bombing
- The Pentagon, September 11, 2001
