= Bluff Park, Long Beach, California =

Bluff Park
- Neighborhood of Long Beach
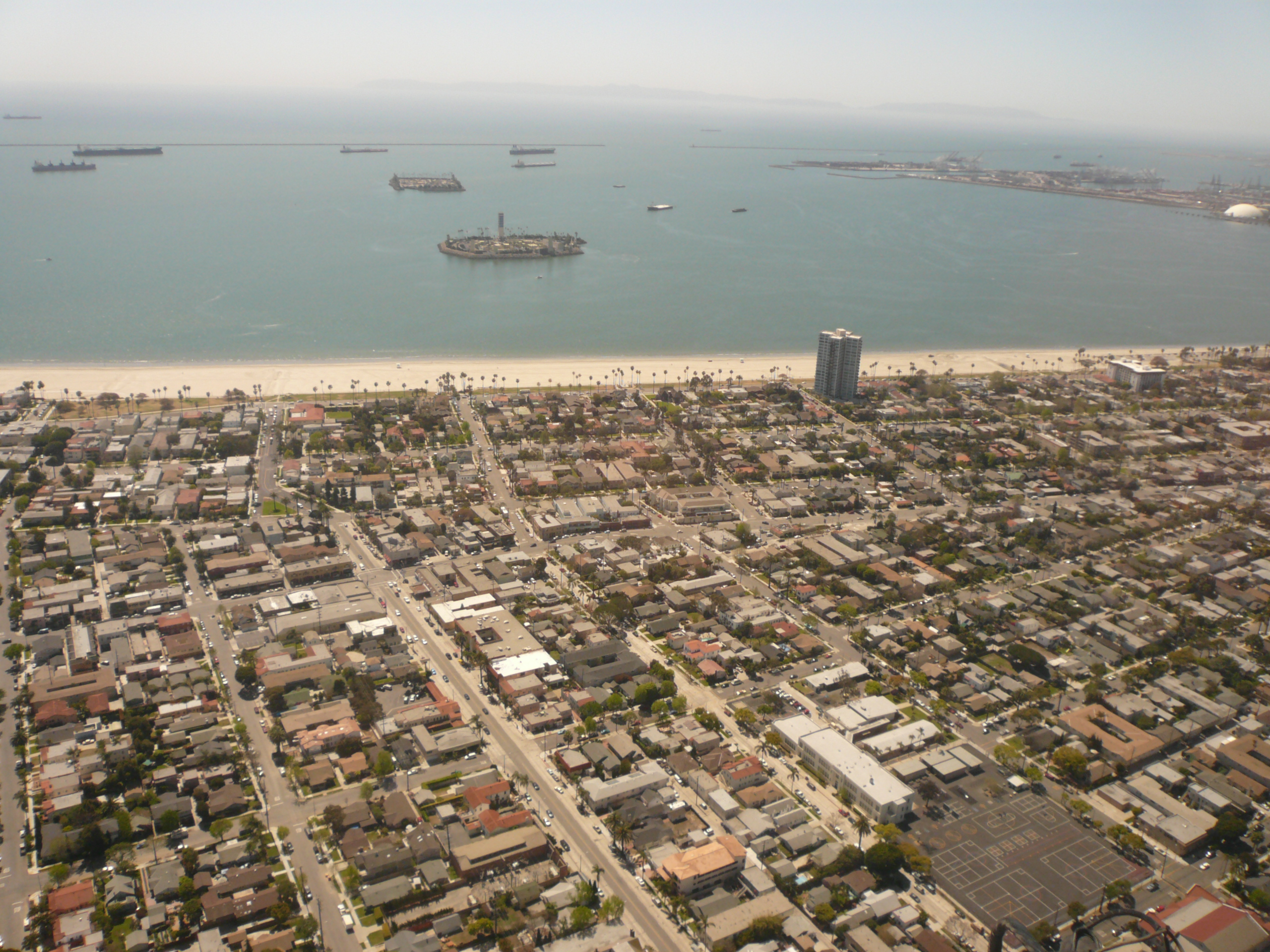
- The neighborhoods of Bluff Park and Bluff Heights in Long Beach, California, looking to the southwest. Bluff Park is in the middle portion of the image near the shoreline, with Bluff Heights in the lower part of the image.

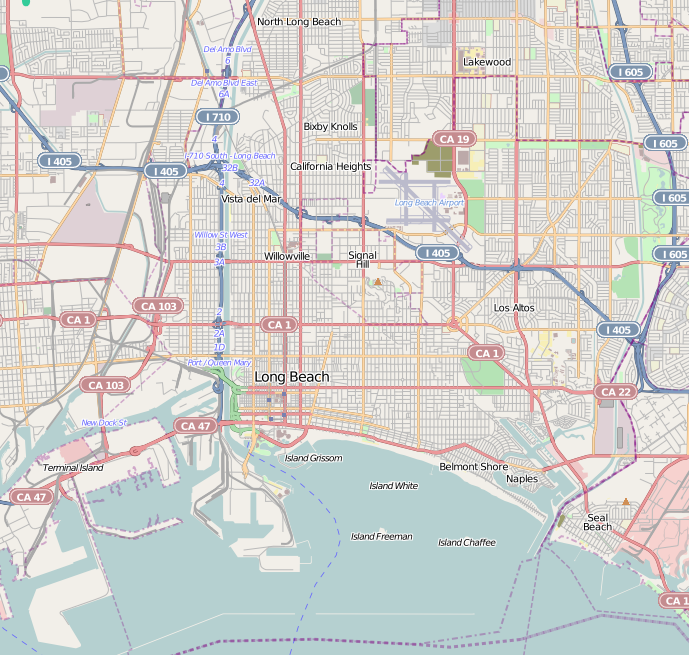
- Location within Long Beach, California Location within the Los Angeles metropolitan area Location within southern California Location within California Location within the United States
- Coordinates: 33°45′49.45″N 118°9′31.74″W
- Country: United States
- State: California
- County: Los Angeles
- City: Long Beach
- Website: bluffpark.org

Bluff Park is a small, upscale neighborhood in Long Beach, California, United States. There is a bluff along much of the beach in Long Beach, and on one stretch, there is the narrow Bluff Park from which the neighborhood gets its name.

Bluff Park is the location of the Long Beach Museum of Art, as well as many older, well-maintained homes. There is also a Buddhist monastery that once was a Roman Catholic convent.

The boundaries for the Bluff Park Historic District (founded in 1982) are defined as Ocean Boulevard on the south, Junipero Avenue of the west, a jagged line between 2nd St. and Broadway on the north, and Loma Avenue on the east. The community of Belmont Heights is to the east of Bluff Park, the community of Bluff Heights is to the north, and the community of Alamitos Beach is to the west.

== Bluff Park ==
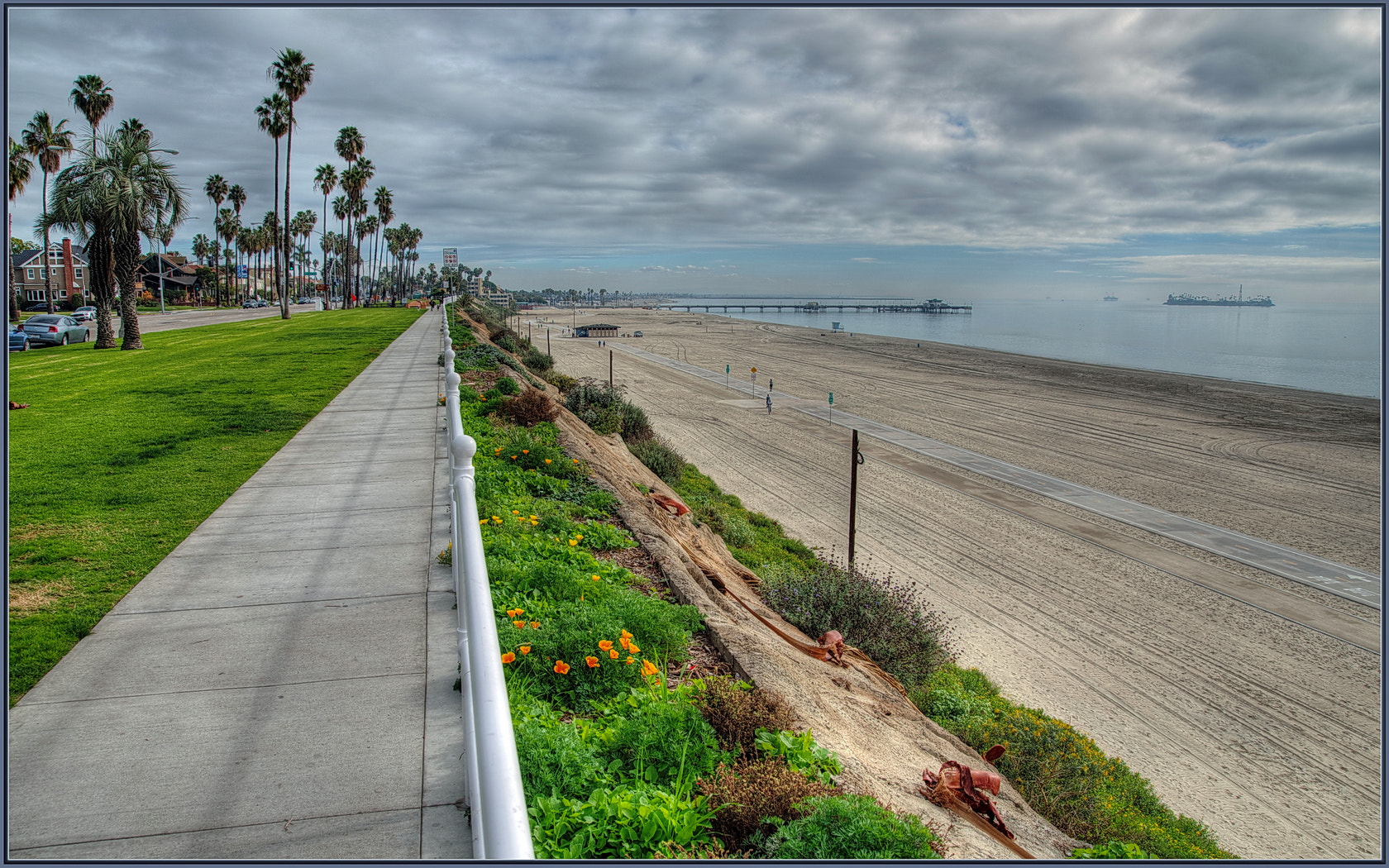
Bluff Park, and the Shoreline Pedestrian Bikepath and Belmont Veterans Memorial Pier

Bluff Park is a 25.8-acre (104,000 m^{2}) park located between Ocean Blvd. and a tall bluff above the large sandy beach in the area. It is frequented by joggers, strollers, and dog walkers. Hobbyists with radio-controlled gliders like to use the natural updrafts of the bluff for their model planes. There is a replica of The Lone Sailor in the park in honor of Long Beach's Naval heritage.

== Historic buildings and homes ==
The historic district includes a variety of architectural styles, including Greene and Greene, American Craftsman, California Bungalow, Spanish Revival, Prairie Style, American Colonial Revival, Tudor and Mediterranean from the early 1900s.

- The Heartwell/Lowe House, 1919, 2505 East 2nd St., Colonial Revival (just outside the Bluff Park Historic District)
- Long Beach Museum of Art (the Elizabeth Milbank Anderson house and carriage house), 1912, 2300 East Ocean Blvd., Craftsman Bungalow
- Long Beach Monastery, 3361 E. Ocean Blvd., (affiliation: Mahayana, Ch'an (Zen), Dharma Realm Buddhist Association)
- Irving Gill house, 2749 E. Ocean Boulevard
- Weathering Heights
- Roland Swaffield house, architecture by L. Milton Wolf
- La Villa de la Luna, built 1923
- Southwind House, built for Dr. A.C. Sellery, co-founder of Seaside Hospital; designed by William Horace Austin, 1913
- Beans Reardon House
- Clarence J. Smale
- Roland Coate
- Meyer & Holler

== Gallery ==
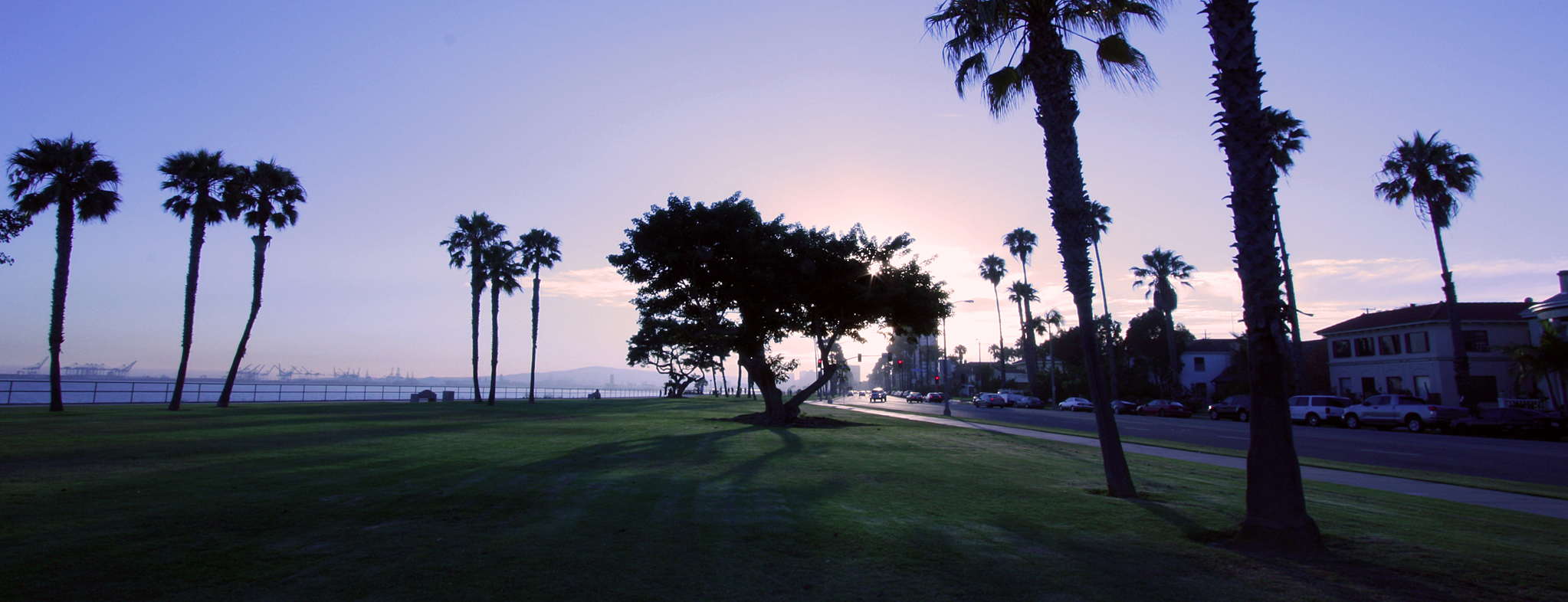
Bluff Park at sunset

Lone Sailor statue

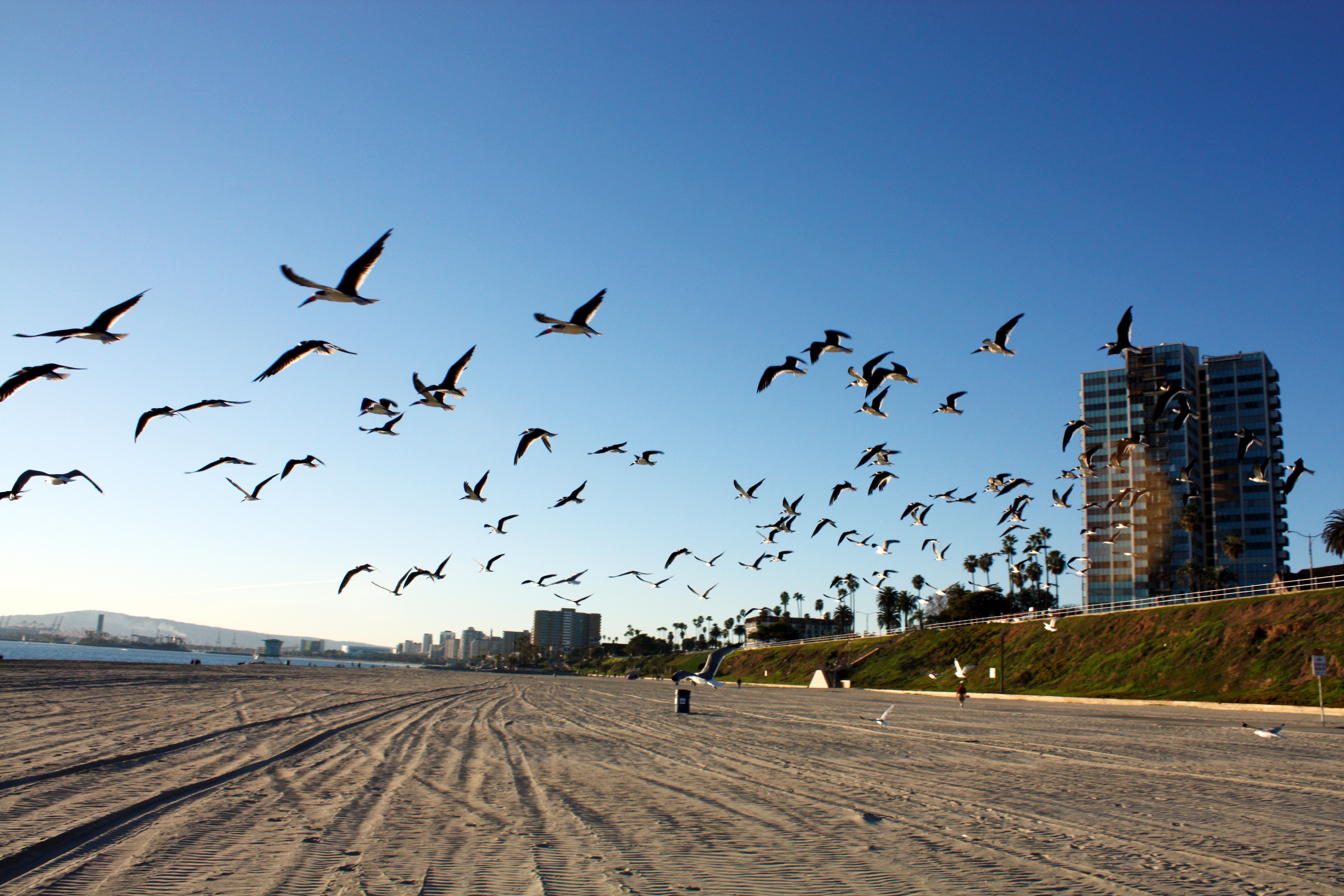
The beach below Bluff Park

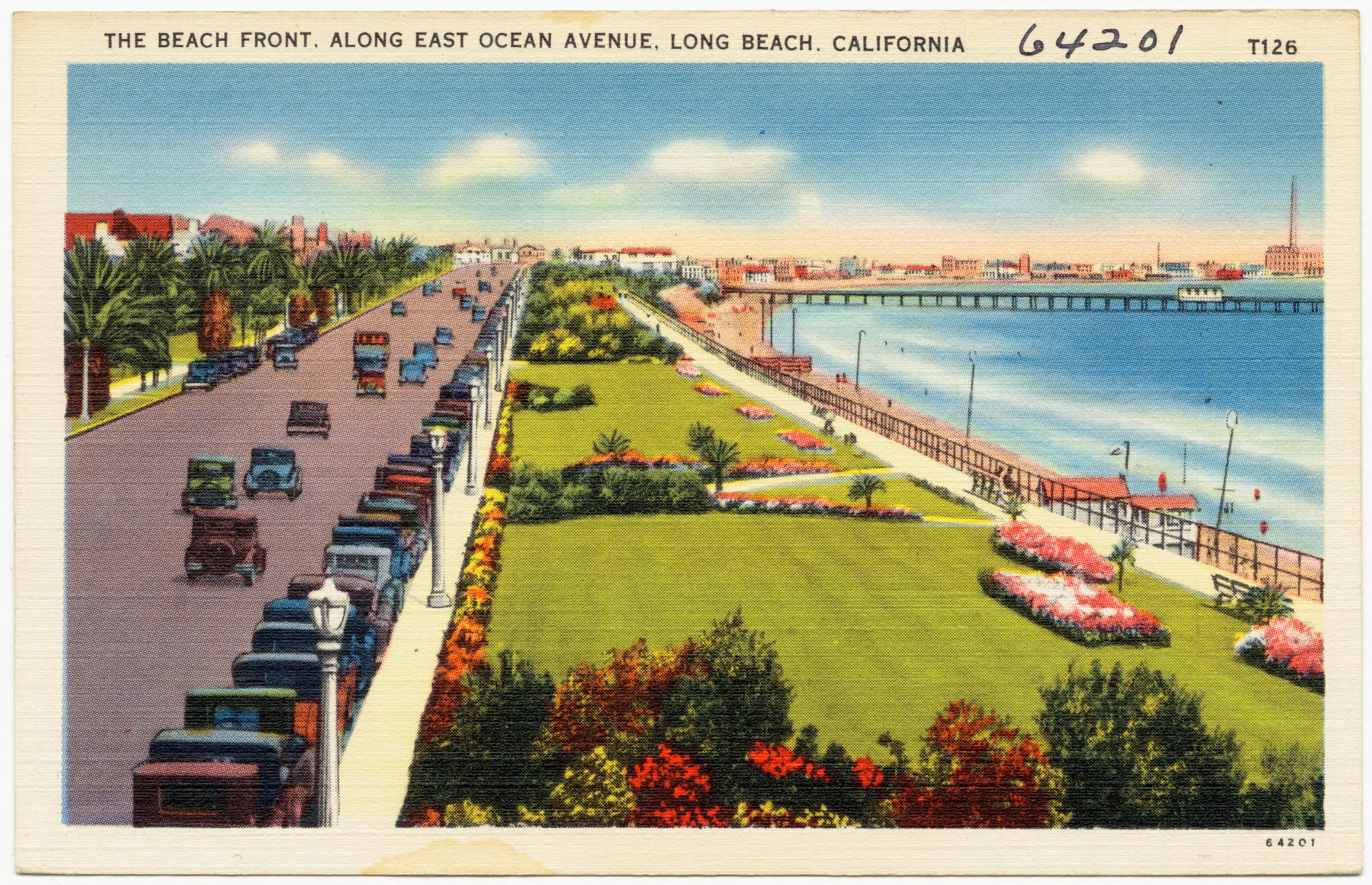
Postcard, circa 1930 to 1945

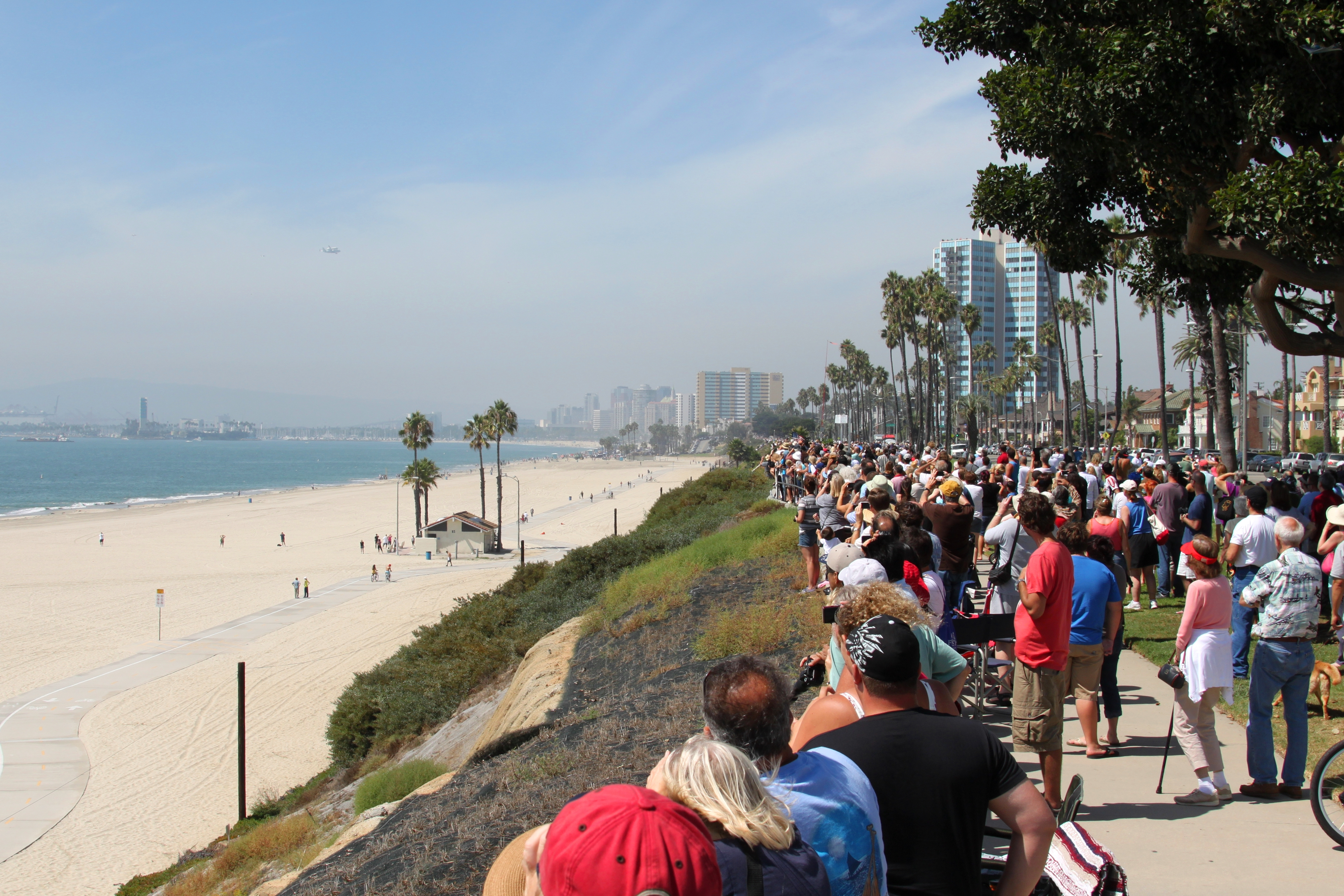
Crowd at Bluff Park watching the Space Shuttle Endeavour en route to Los Angeles International Airport, 2012

== See also ==
- Neighborhoods of Long Beach, California
