= Town Point Park =

Park in Norfolk, Virginia

Coordinates: 36°50′44″N 76°17′40″W

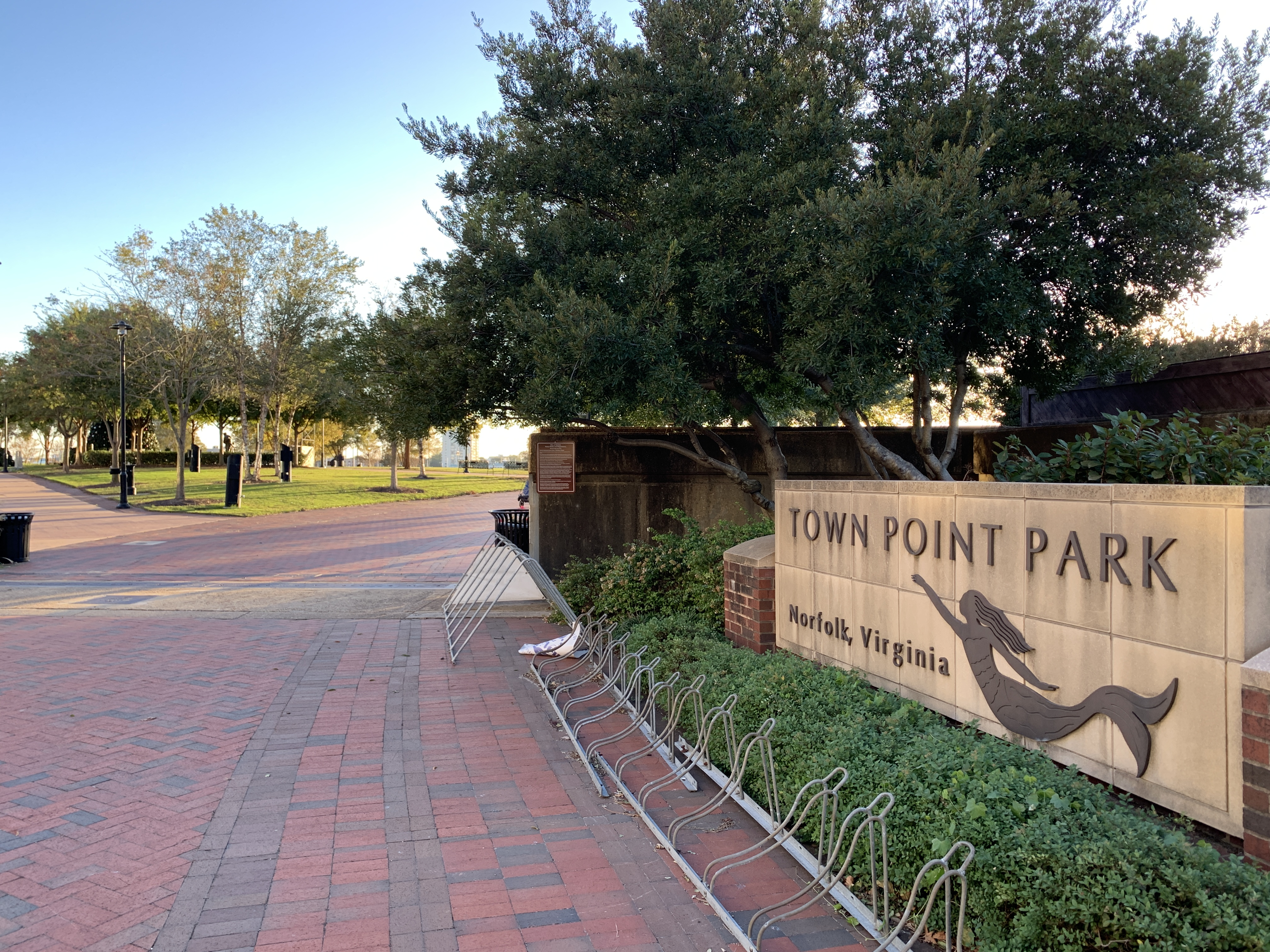
Town Point Park

Town Point Park is a 7-acre (2.8 ha) waterfront city park on the Elizabeth River in Norfolk, Virginia, USA. The park hosts major outdoor concerts, award-winning festivals and special events each year to include Norfolk Harborfest, Bayou Boogaloo, and 4 July Celebrations. Norfolk Festevents programs Town Point Park on behalf of the City of Norfolk. Located in the park are The Homecoming and the Armed Forces Memorial.

The Armed Forces Memorial is located at the southwest corner of the park, on the river. The Memorial plaza features 20 letters home from US service people from the American Revolution through the Gulf War, all of whom died after writing their letters. The letters are engraved on bronze plates and appear as if strewn by the wind on the Memorial.

Town Point Park is located in downtown Norfolk and is adjacent to Nauticus and the museum ship USS Wisconsin (BB-64).

In October 2008, almost all of the park was bulldozed to prepare for a total redesign of the park. As of July 2009 it has been open to the public for daily use.
