= Stanley Bleifeld =

American sculptor (1924–2011)

- Born: August 28, 1924; Brooklyn, New York City, New York, United States
- Died: March 26, 2011 (aged 86); Norwalk, Connecticut, United States
- Occupation: Sculptor
- Spouse: Naomi Ruby (m. 1949–2011; his death)
- Children: 2

Stanley Bleifeld (August 28, 1924 – March 26, 2011) was an American sculptor. He lived between Weston, Connecticut, and Pietrasanta, Italy.

== Early life ==
Stanley Bleifeld was born on August 28, 1924, in Brooklyn in New York City, New York. He earned bachelor of fine arts, and a master of fine arts degree in 1949 in painting from Tyler School of Art of Temple University in Philadelphia, Pennsylvania. After a trip to Rome in around 1959 or 1960, he gave up painting for sculpture.

== Career ==
Bleifeld received the following awards: Sculptor of the Year in Pietrasanta and the World, in 2004, the Henry Hering Memorial Medal of the National Sculpture Society, (he was president of the Society from 1991 to 1993), the Medal of Liberty from the American Civil Liberties Union, the Shikler Award from National Academy of Design, among others.

Bleifeld was a National Academician in Sculpture, and a member of the National Academy of Design, and helped set policy for that organization.

Bleifeld's public monuments include sculptures for the United States Navy Memorial (he served in the Navy in World War II) in Washington, D.C., the Knights of Columbus Memorial in Connecticut, and baseball players at the Baseball Hall of Fame in Cooperstown, N.Y. The originals of his works The Lone Sailor and The Homecoming are two created for the Navy Memorial. Subsequently, a number of replicas deployed across the United States. On October 13, 2017, the occasion of the 242nd anniversary of the United States Navy, a replica of The Lone Sailor was dedicated in Pearl Harbor, Hawaii.

His work is in numerous private collections throughout the world. In 2008, his monument to the Civil Rights Movement, It Seemed like Reaching for the Moon was dedicated at the statehouse in Richmond, Virginia.

== Personal life and death ==
In 1949, Bleifeld married Naomi Ruby. The couple had two daughters, Becky and Emily. From 1950 until his death he lived and worked in Weston, Connecticut, spending part of each year at a home and studio in Pietrasanta, Italy.

Bleifeld died on March 26, 2011, in Norwalk, Connecticut from a cerebral hemorrhage following a fall.
