= Clarence J. Smale =

American architect

- Born: Clarence Justin Smale; November 2, 1886; Ballona, California, U.S.
- Died: October 28, 1966 (aged 79)
- Other name: C.J. Smale
- Occupation: Architect
- Spouse: Rose
- Children: 1
- Parent(s): John Smale; Mary Smale

Clarence Justin Smale, also known as C.J. Smale, (Nov. 2, 1886-Oct. 28, 1966) was an American architect.

== Early life ==
Smale was born to John and Mary Smale on Nov. 2, 1886 in Ballona, California. He was one of six children. His father, born in Canada, was a farmer. The Smale couple divorced by 1910, with Mary taking her children to live in Gull Harbor, Washington. It was there that Clarence learned the trade of house carpentry. At age 30 in 1917, he married Newfoundland native Rose St. John. A year later they had a daughter, Virginia.

== Career ==
Though Smale was working in architecture by at least 1917, he formally founded his architectural firm in 1923. His chief draftsperson was Edith Northman. One of his design partners was Lewis Elbert Blaize and among his collaborations were works with Chisholm & Meikle as well as S. Charles Lee, the latter with whom he created Marchetti's Café (1925). His own home, constructed in 1925, was located at 625 S. Rimpau Blvd. in the Hancock Park neighborhood of Los Angeles; it is still standing as of 2020 and is protected by an historic preservation overlay zone (HPOZ). In his career, Smale designed homes for Buster Keaton and Monsignor Kenneth R. O'Brien, a prominent member of the Roman Catholic Archdiocese of Los Angeles. Some of his work has varying ranges of historic protection, like the Loyola Theater, designated L.A. Historic-Cultural Resource Number 259, and the Monsignor O'Brien House, designated Los Angeles Historic-Cultural Monument #861.

== Select works ==
- Colorado Theater, East Pasadena, California (1948)
- Loyola Theater, Westchester, California (1946)
- Hawaii Theatre, Hollywood, Los Angeles, California (co-design with Carl G. Moeller, 1940)
- 434 N. Genesee Ave., Los Angeles, California (1937)
- 336 N. Gardner St., Los Angeles, California (1937)
- 268 N. Saint Pierre Rd., Los Angeles, California (1937)
- Allen Theater, South Gate, Los Angeles, California (remodel, 1936)
- Oliver Mitchell Theater, South Gate, Los Angeles, California (remodel, 1936)
- 364 S. Cloverdale Ave., Los Angeles, California (1930)
- Dr. W.E. Waddell Residence, 539 S Mapleton Dr., Los Angeles, California (1932)
- Smith House, Hancock Park, Los Angeles, California (1929-1930)
- Architect's Show Home, 361 North Citrus Ave., Los Angeles, California (1927)
- Marchetti's Café (1925)
- Superba Apartments, 335 S. Berendo St., Los Angeles, California (1925)
- Monsignor Kenneth R. O'Brien House, 130 N. Catalina St., Los Angeles, California (1924-1925)
- 4941 Ambrose Ave., Los Feliz, Los Angeles, California (1924)
- W.O. Boston Residence, Ambrose Avenue, Los Angeles, California (1924)
- Buster Keaton Home, 543 South Muirfield Rd., Hancock Park, Los Angeles, California (1923)
- L. W. Gentry House, 2001 Mendocino Ln., Altadena, California (1921)
- House in Bluff Park, Long Beach (1925)
