= William Thompson (admiral) =

United States rear admiral (b. 1922, d. 2018)

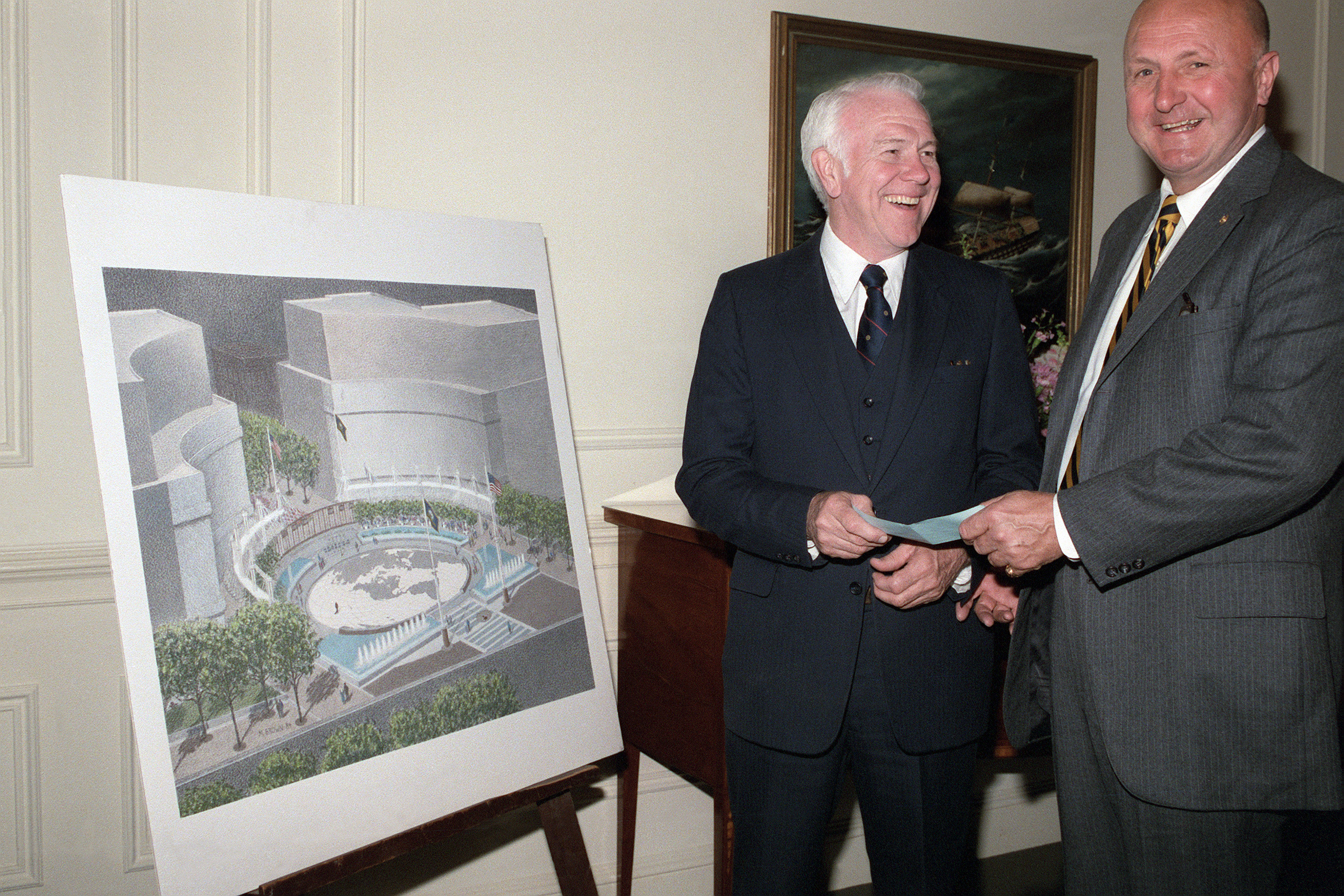
- Retired Rear Admiral William Thompson, left
- Born: September 22, 1922; Escanaba, Michigan, U.S.
- Died: October 15, 2018 (aged 96) Bethesda, Maryland, U.S.
- Allegiance: United States
- Branch: United States Navy
- Rank: Rear admiral

William Thompson (September 22, 1922 – October 15, 2018) was an American United States Navy rear admiral who in retirement organized and led the effort to create a Navy memorial and heritage center on Pennsylvania Avenue in Northwest Washington, DC. He was chief of the U.S. Navy Memorial Foundation, a private, not-for-profit lobbying and advocacy organization, for 15 years. Rear Admiral Thompson was the first public affairs officer in the Navy to be promoted to rear admiral and assigned as Chief of Navy Information (CHINFO). He served as CHINFO until he retired in 1975. He shared the memories of his life in his autobiography, “Gumption: My Life-My Words.”
