= Art Theatre =

Historic movie theater in Long Beach, California

- Interactive map of Art Theatre
- Former names: Carter Theatre (1925–1934); Lee Theatre (1934–1947)
- Address: 2025 E 4th Street; Long Beach, California; United States
- Coordinates: 33°46′19″N 118°10′01″W
- Screen: 1

Construction
- Opened: January 22, 1925; 101 years ago
- Renovated: 1934, 1947, 2008
- Architects: Robert C. Aldrich (1925); Schilling & Schilling (1934); Hugh Gibbs (1947)

Website
- arttheatrelongbeach.org

The Art Theatre is a historic movie theater on Retro Row in Long Beach, California. Opened in 1925 as the Carter Theatre, it is the oldest operating cinema in the city. After sustaining damage from the 1933 Long Beach earthquake, the venue was remodeled and reopened as the Lee Theatre in 1934. The Art currently operates indie and foreign film programming.

== History ==
In 1924, J. W. and L. W. Carter commissioned the construction of a movie theater on 4th Street in Long Beach. After a year of construction overseen by general contractor Charles Bigelow, the Carter Theatre opened on January 22, 1925, with two evening showings of the silent film The Siren of Seville. E. C. Heard, a local film showman who operated various cinemas in Greater Los Angeles, served as the inaugural theater manager.

On the evening of March 10, 1933, a severe earthquake struck Long Beach; the Carter Theatre was one of the many buildings damaged. Following an extensive renovation, the venue was reopened in 1934. Building owner E. H. Lee renamed it the Lee Theatre thereafter.

In 1947, the theater was renovated to the plans of architect Hugh Gibbs, including a new lobby and bathrooms. In conjunction with the remodel, the venue was renamed the Art Theatre. On March 9, 1969, the Art survived a structure fire and continued operation afterward.

In 2007, a group of four investors purchased the Art. The theater was in disrepair and still showing movies on film stock. The group commissioned a renovation of the venue that included an architectural restoration to its 1934 state and the installation of a digital projector.

== Architecture ==
The original building facade was designed in the Spanish Colonial Revival style. The front of the structure included two retail spaces flanking the central entrance. Atop the facade's central arch was a cupola with a rotating light to serve as a "constant attraction" at night. The initial version of the venue featured an "artistically decorated" vestibule and lobby. The structure was fireproofed.

The auditorium measures 50 feet (15 m) wide and 145 feet (44 m) long. In the original 1925 configuration, the theater seated 636 with a floor incline of 6 feet (1.8 m). The venue originally featured a Style D Wurlitzer organ that was said to be the biggest in the city. Local artisan Charles T. Freelove Jr. designed several ornamentations, including the proscenium arch, organ grills, and poster frames.

Schilling & Schilling designed the 1934 post-earthquake Streamline Moderne iteration of the venue. New facets of the theater included a box office, terrazzo designs, fluting, and a sign tower on the roof. In 1947, Hugh Gibbs designed a set of mid-century modern alterations to the building that included glass brick walls, a new marquee, and a remodeled lobby. In 2008, the theater was restored to the specifications of the 1934 blueprints.
