= Carroll Park, Long Beach, California =

Neighborhood in Long Beach, California, United States

Carroll Park
- Neighborhood of Long Beach
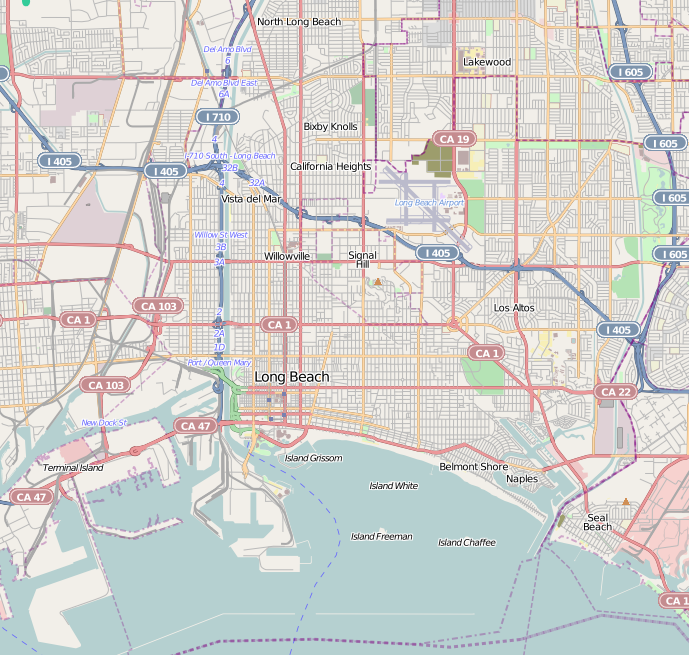
- Location within Long Beach, California Location within the Los Angeles metropolitan area Location within southern California Location within California Location within the United States
- Country: United States
- State: California
- County: Los Angeles
- City: Long Beach
- Website: www.carrollpark.org

Carroll Park is a historic neighborhood in the city of Long Beach, California.

== Location ==
Carroll Park is bordered by 3rd Street to the south, Wisconsin Avenue to the east, 4th Street to the north, and Junipero Avenue to the west.

To the south and east of Carroll Park is Bluff Heights, to the north is Rose Park South, to the north and west is the 4th Street Corridor, and to the south and west is Alamitos Beach.

== Description ==
Carroll Park is a residential neighborhood of over 100 homes. The circular layout features narrow streets that wind around four grassy park areas anchoring the neighborhood's inner circle. The unique street pattern may have been meant to deter farmers from ruining the streets with heavy wagons, or to slow horse-drawn carriages.

While the majority of homes are California Bungalows, some of the 16 other historically significant architectural styles in the district include Colonial Revival, Spanish/Mediterranean Revival, and Queen Anne. Today, about 75 houses predating 1940 survive along with three original barns.

There are no businesses within the neighborhood. A Methodist church built in 1903 sits at the southwest corner and a Lutheran church stands adjacent to the northwest border.

== History ==
Originally part of the Alamitos Townsite, Carroll Park was the first planned housing tract in Long Beach. In 1902, John Carroll began subdividing his 30 acres of orchards into a circular pattern of streets and lots. The following year, 15 lots making up the Carroll Park tract were placed on the market.

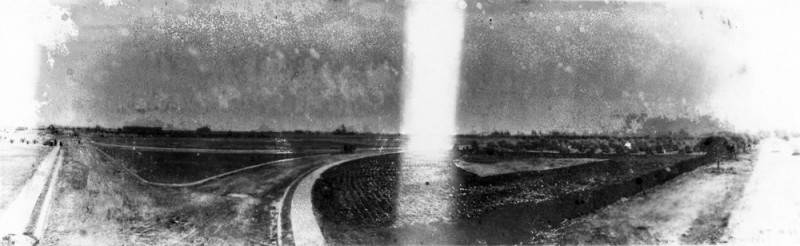
A view of Carroll Park being subdivided by John Carroll. This photograph shows rural roads running past fields and trees in a flat landscape. Circa 1898

A variety of homes were constructed during the principal development period of 1898 to 1923. In 1910, Carroll donated the parkland in between lots to the city.

In 1983, Carroll Park was designated a Historic Landmark District, becoming one of the first in the city.

== Movies and television ==
Carroll Park appears in Coyote Ugly.
