= United States Navy Memorial =

Memorial in Washington, DC

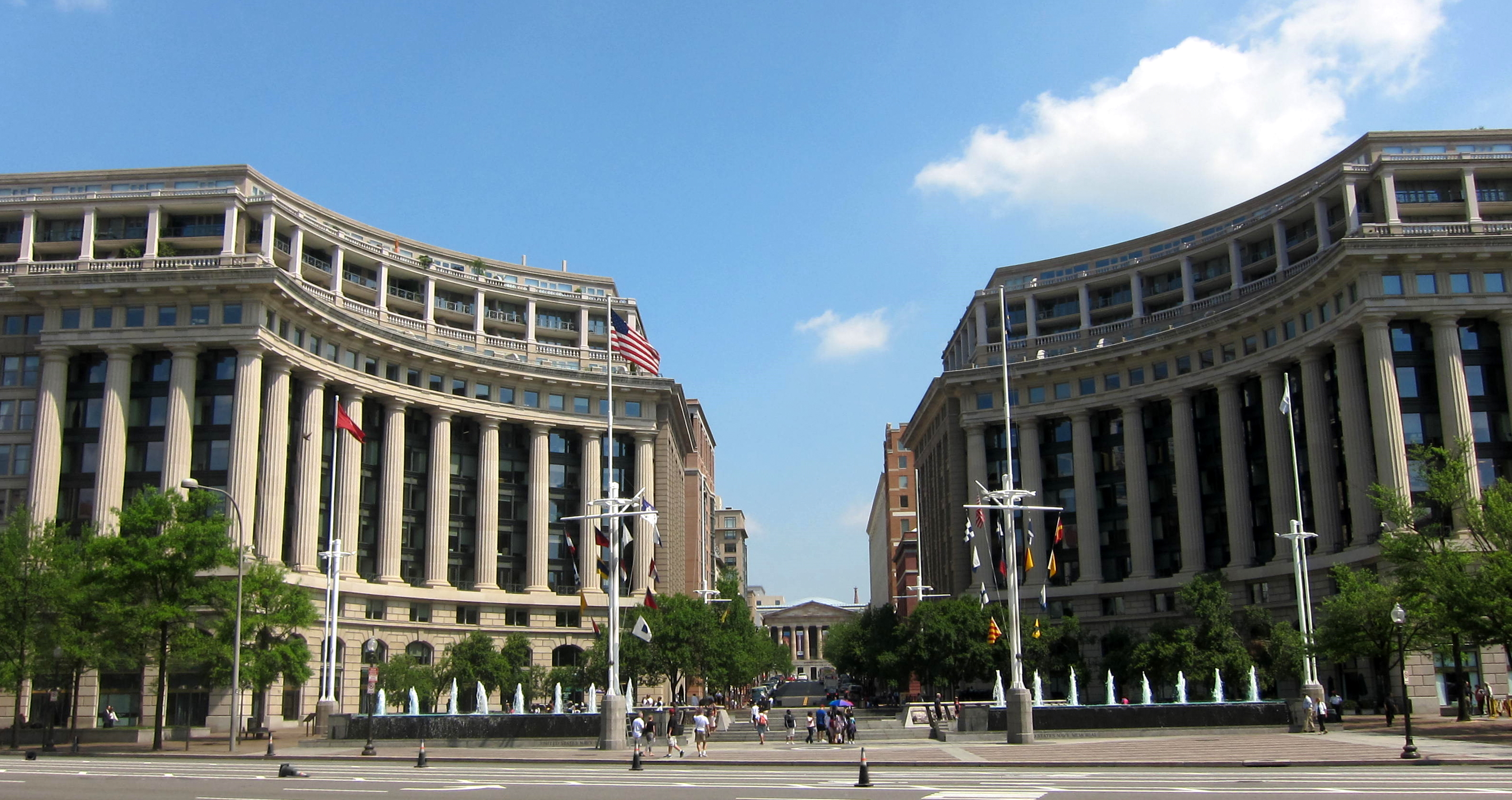
- United States Navy Memorial

- Location within Central Washington, D.C.
- Location: Washington, D.C., U.S.
- Coordinates: 38°53′39″N 77°01′23″W
- Established: October 13, 1987
- Governing body: U.S. Navy Memorial Foundation
- Website: www.navymemorial.org

The United States Navy Memorial is a memorial in Washington, D.C. honoring those who have served or are currently serving in the Navy, Marine Corps, Coast Guard, and the Merchant Marine.

It lies on Pennsylvania Avenue NW between 7th Street Northwest and 9th Street Northwest, adjacent to the Archives station of the Washington Metro and the National Archives building. The National Park Service, through its National Mall and Memorial Parks administrative unit, provides technical and maintenance assistance to the foundation. The plaza is part of Pennsylvania Avenue National Historic Site.

Associated with the memorial is the Naval Heritage Center, which offers spaces available for rent, and is open year-round.

== History ==
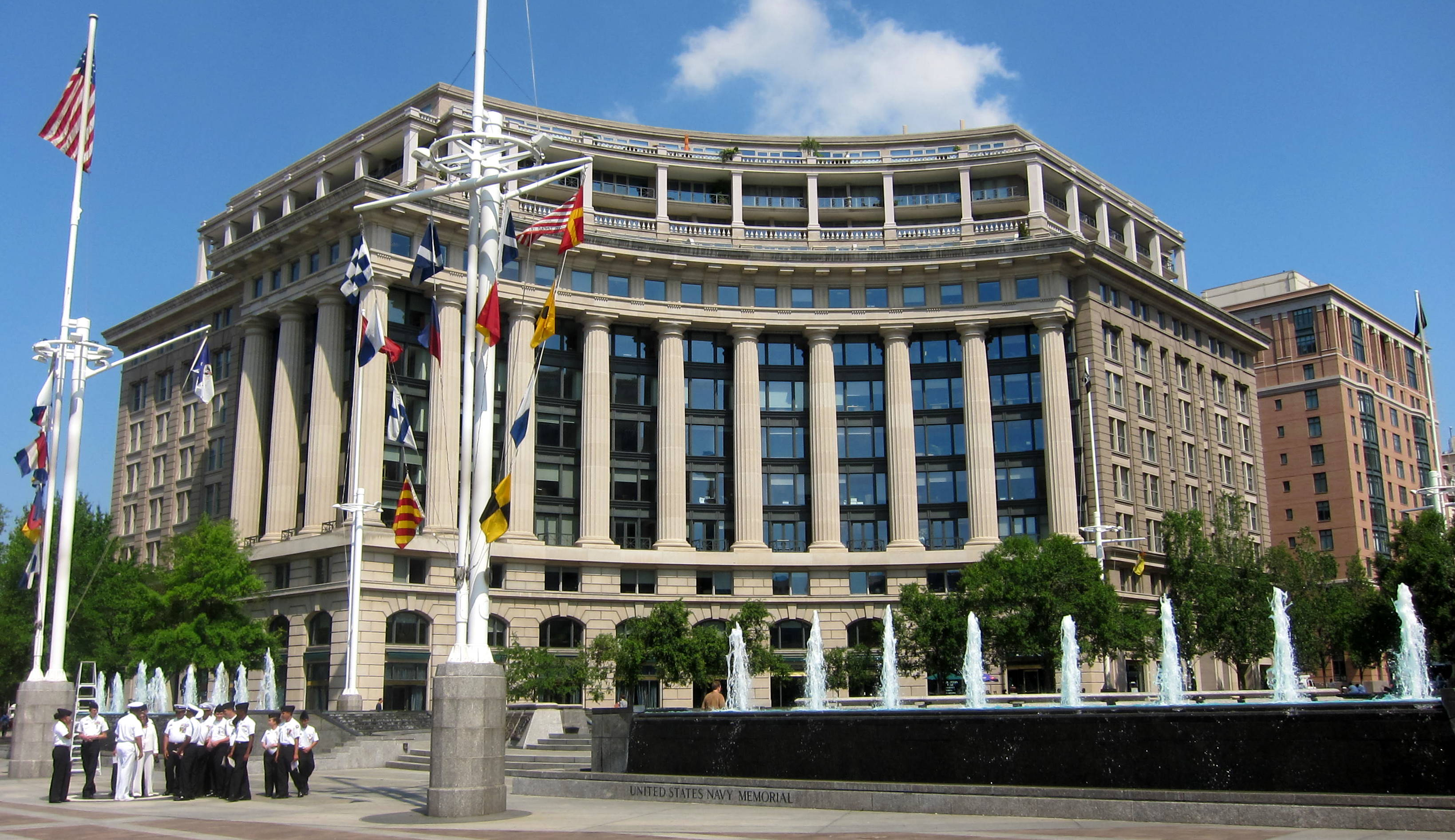
The Navy Memorial in 2010

Following the establishment of American independence following the American Revolutionary War, architect Pierre L'Enfant envisioned a memorial in the nation's capital "to celebrate the first rise of the Navy and consecrate its progress and achievements."

Pennsylvania Avenue, the boulevard that links the U.S. Capitol and White House, was chosen as the site for a memorial to all of the U.S. sea services.

=== 20th century ===
After President John F. Kennedy, a World War II Navy war veteran, inspired the redevelopment of Pennsylvania Avenue, another, Admiral Arleigh Burke, proclaimed in 1977 that "we have talked long enough about a navy memorial and it's time we did something about it."

In the spring of 1977, Burke, a former three-term Chief of Naval Operations, started to recruit a group to form the private, non-profit U.S. Navy Memorial Foundation. The following year, the foundation, led by Rear Admiral William Thompson, USN (Ret.), began work on the enabling legislation, design, site selection, and fund raising that would lead to the construction and subsequent of a memorial.

Congress authorized the memorial in 1980, with the stipulation that funding come solely from private contributions. In March 1980, President Jimmy Carter signed the act into law.

The foundation teamed up with the Pennsylvania Avenue Development Corporation to use Market Square as the site for the memorial. The pair selected William Conklin and James Rossant of New York as architects.

By December 1985, the foundation had raised enough funds to earn a go-ahead from the Secretary of the Interior and construction got underway the following month.

By August 1987, Stanley Bleifeld completed work on The Lone Sailor statue as construction of the memorial neared completion at the site. The Lone Sailor has become the iconic symbol of the U.S. Navy Memorial's mission to Honor, Recognize, and Celebrate the men and women of the Sea Services, past, present, and future; and to Inform the public about their service. Replicas of the Lone Sailor have been placed around the world in partnership with the Navy Memorial.

The memorial was dedicated on October 13, 1987.

From late 1987 to mid-1990, two buildings were constructed on the memorial's northern perimeter. The eastern of the two buildings was selected for the memorial's visitor center. The building's shell was sufficiently completed by September 1989 to allow construction to begin for the interior of the Visitors Center. The visitor center opened in June 1991 and was formally dedicated on October 12, 1991. Some $18-million was raised by opening day of the visitor center, and fund raising continues today, to retire remaining construction debt and support educational programs undertaken by the foundation.

=== 21st century ===
The Lone Sailor statue

During the summer of 2006, the water in the fountains of the Navy Memorial was colored blue with chemicals added to fight algae growth. According to a spokesperson for the memorial, the algae has been surprisingly difficult to eliminate, and that they "figured it was better to have blue water than to have an algae-encrusted memorial." The blue water was gone by the end of the summer.

Memorial Plaza features The Lone Sailor, a statue by Stanley Bleifeld and tribute to all personnel of the sea services overlooking the Granite Sea, a map depicting the world's oceans, using an azimuthal projection centered on Washington, DC. Surrounding these are two fountains honoring the personnel of the American Navy and the other navies of the world. Its southern hemisphere is surrounded by 26 bronze high reliefs commemorating events, personnel, and communities of the various sea services.

== United States Navy Memorial Visitor Center ==
Adjacent to the plaza is the United States Navy Memorial Visitor Center. It is free to the public and a popular destination for tour groups visiting the nation's capital, including veterans, students, and reunion groups.

The Visitor Center is a small museum that houses exhibits one story below street level like The American Sailor: Agile, Capable, and Talented and Zumwalt: The Current that Brought the Navy to the Shores of the 20th Century. The American Sailor tells the story of the birth of the United States Navy, and explores how individuals have defended the country at sea and provided U.S. military services wherever the seas extend over time. Zumwalt exhibits oral histories, personal keepsakes, family artifacts and first-hand written accounts of Zumwalt’ s life as CNO, leader, father, husband, and true American that propelled the Navy into the 20th century.

It is also home to the Navy Log room, where visitors can search for and enroll service members. The Navy Log is the nation's largest publicly available repository of Sea Service personnel.

After visitors explore the exhibits, ship models, commemorative plaques, uniforms, and badges and insignia on display, they can step inside the Delbert D. Black National Chief's Mess. This interactive space informs the public about the important and unique role of a Navy Chief Petty Officer.

The Media Resource Center provides a library of printed, audio and video historical documents on the Navy. The Navy Log room has touch-screen kiosks to register and search for Sea Service members and veterans.

=== Events at the Navy Memorial ===
The Navy Memorial hosts events throughout the year, both inside the Visitor Center and outdoors on Memorial Plaza, to strengthen the connection between the public and the Sea Services.

This includes commemorative ceremonies throughout the year, outdoor movies, and performances by the United States Navy Band.

The Navy Memorial also hosts virtual events like the speaker series, which provides opportunities for senior Naval leaders to update and engage interested Americans across the country and abroad about ongoing Navy efforts and operations.

== Navy Log ==
The United States Navy Memorial's Navy Log is the nation's largest publicly available database of Sea Service personnel. It was established as a tribute to those who have served and a permanent archive of their military service. It has over 745,000 entries that include photos, service branches, significant duty stations, awards, and more.

== Memorial quotes ==
On an outdoor wall at the Navy Memorial are engraved noteworthy sayings from the history of the US Navy, and who said them. Among which are:

- "I have not yet begun to fight!" – Captain John Paul Jones – 1779
- "Don't give up the ship!" – Captain James Lawrence – 1813
- "We have met the enemy and they are ours." – Commodore Oliver Hazard Perry – 1813
- "Damn the torpedoes, full steam ahead." – Admiral David Farragut – 1864
- "You may fire when you are ready, Gridley." – Commodore George Dewey – 1898
- "Speak softly and carry a big stick." – President Theodore Roosevelt – 1907
- "Sighted sub, sank same" – Aviation Machinist's Mate 1/c Donald Francis Mason – 1942
- "Underway on nuclear power." – Commander Eugene P. Wilkinson – January 17, 1955
- "That's one small step for (a) man, one giant leap for mankind" – Astronaut and Naval Aviator Neil Armstrong – July 20, 1969
- "I can imagine no more rewarding a career. And any man who may be asked in this century what he did to make his life worthwhile, I think can respond with a good deal of pride and satisfaction: 'I served in the United States Navy.'" President John F. Kennedy, 1 August 1963, at Bancroft Hall at the US Naval Academy

== Other Navy memorials ==
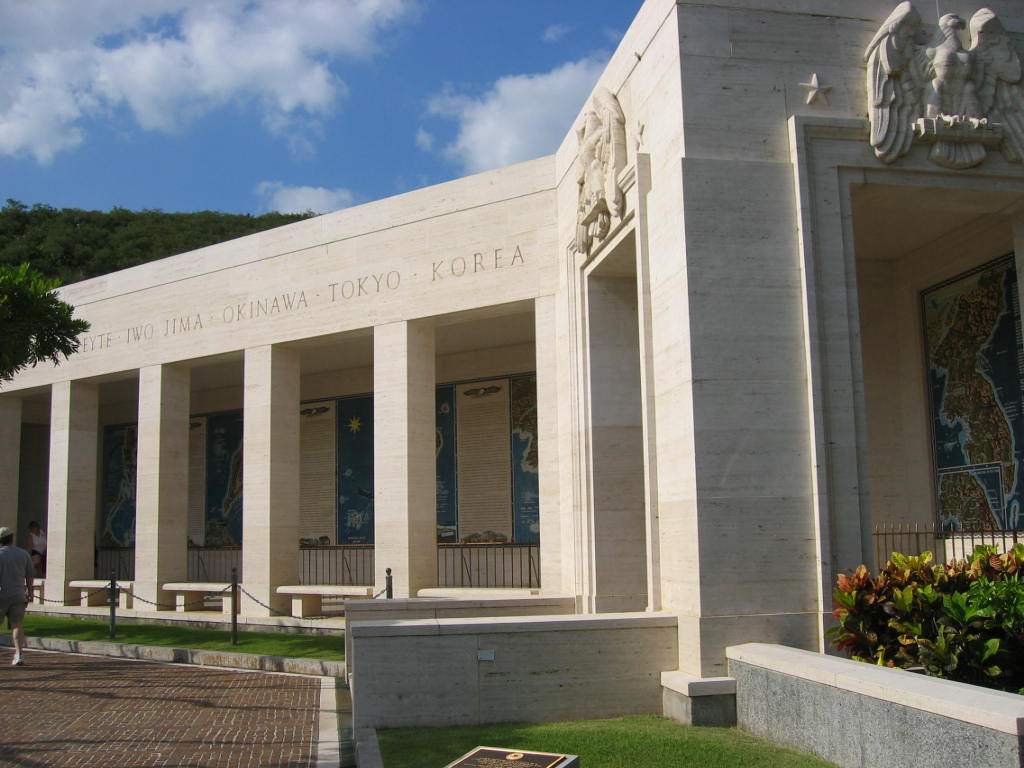
The National Memorial Cemetery of the Pacific in Honolulu

- John Ericsson Memorial
- John Paul Jones Memorial
- National Memorial Cemetery of the Pacific
- Navy – Merchant Marine Memorial
- Peace Monument (Naval Monument)
- Perry's Victory and International Peace Memorial
- Port Chicago Naval Magazine National Memorial
- Seabees Memorial
- UDT-SEAL Memorial
- Monuments and memorials on the campus of the U.S. Naval Academy
- World War II Submarine Torpedo monument
- Battleship Missouri Memorial – USS Missouri (BB-63)
- Battleship New Jersey Museum and Memorial – USS New Jersey (BB-62)
- USS Arizona Memorial (BB-39)
- USS Bennington Monument
- USS Indianapolis National Memorial
- USS Maine memorials
- USS South Dakota (BB-57)
- USS Utah Memorial (BB-31)
- USS YF-415 Memorial, Bare Cove Park, Hingham, Massachusetts
- List of United States submarines designated as memorials
- Various memorials for Lt. Vincent R. Capodanno
- Lt. Hans Grauert Memorial Field
- Ensign C. Markland Kelly Jr. Award
- Lt. Donald McLaughlin Jr. Award

== See also ==
- American War Memorials
- List of public art in Washington, D.C., Ward 6
- Marine Corps War Memorial
- Michigan Soldiers' and Sailors' Monument
- U.S. Navy Museum
