= Plaster mold casting =

Metalworking casting process

Plaster mold casting is a metalworking casting process similar to sand casting except the molding material is plaster of Paris instead of sand. Like sand casting, plaster mold casting is an expendable mold process, however it can only be used with non-ferrous materials. It is used for castings as small as 30 g (1 oz) to as large as 7–10 kg (15–22 lb). Generally, the form takes less than a week to prepare. Production rates of 1–10 units/hr can be achieved with plaster molds.

Parts that are typically made by plaster casting are lock components, gears, valves, fittings, tooling, and ornaments.

== Details ==
The plaster is not pure plaster of Paris, but rather has additives to improve green strength, dry strength, permeability, and castability. For instance, talc or magnesium oxide are added to prevent cracking and reduce setting time; lime and cement limit expansion during baking; glass fibers increase strength; sand can be used as a filler. The ratio of ingredients is 70–80% gypsum and 20–30% additives.

The pattern is usually made from metal, however rubber molds may be used for complex geometry; these molds are called Rubber plaster molds. For example, if the casting includes reentrant angles or complex angular surfaces then the rubber is flexible enough to be removed, unlike metal. These molds are also inexpensive, reusable, more accurate than steel molds, fast to produce, and easy to change.

Typical tolerances are 0.1 mm (0.0039 in) for the first 50 mm (2.0 in) and 0.02 mm per additional centimeter (0.002 in per additional inch). A draft of 0.5 to 1 degree is required. Standard surface finishes that are attainable are 1.3 to 4 micrometers (50–125 μin).

=== Process ===
First, the parting line is determined - either simple two-part or more complex (3 or more). A box is made around the pattern to hold the plaster. Then plaster is mixed and the pattern is sprayed with a thin film of parting compound also called a release agent to prevent the plaster from sticking to the pattern. The plaster is then poured over the pattern and the box holding the plaster and pattern is vibrated by mechanical means in order to fill all gaps and to release air bubbles. The plaster sets, usually in about 15 minutes, and the pattern is removed. The mold is then baked, between 120 °C (248 °F) and 260 °C (500 °F), to remove any excess water. The dried mold is then assembled, preheated, and the metal poured. Finally, after the metal has solidified, the plaster is broken from the cast part. The mold is usually damaged from the metal so reusing is usually not done. Discarded plaster can be recycled by grinding but care must be used since silica dust causes permanent lung damage.

== Advantages and disadvantages ==
Plaster mold casting is used when an excellent surface finish and good dimensional accuracy is required. Because the plaster has a low thermal conductivity and heat capacity, the metal cools more slowly than in a sand mold, which allows the metal to fill thin cross-sections; the minimum possible cross-section is 0.6 mm (0.024 in). This results in a near net shape casting, which can be a cost advantage on complex parts. It also produces minimal scrap material.

The major disadvantage of the process is that it can only be used with lower melting temperature non-ferrous materials, such as aluminium, magnesium, zinc and sometimes copper alloys. The most commonly used material is aluminium. The maximum working temperature of plaster is 1,200 °C (2,200 °F), so higher melting temperature materials would melt the plaster mold. Also, the sulfur in the gypsum reacts with iron, making it unsuitable for casting ferrous materials.

Another disadvantage is that its long cooling times restrict production volume. Onetime molds are often quenched in water but only after completing solidification so hot metal does not fly everywhere. Proper quenching can aid in mold removal and it makes some alloys stronger.

Plaster is not as stable as sand, so it is dependent on several factors, including the consistency of the plaster composition, pouring procedures, and curing techniques. If these factors are not closely monitored the mold can be distorted, shrink upon drying, have a poor surface finish, or fail completely.
