= Bluff Heights, Long Beach, California =

Coordinates: 33.7692°N 118.1592°W

Bluff Heights, California
- Neighborhood of Long Beach
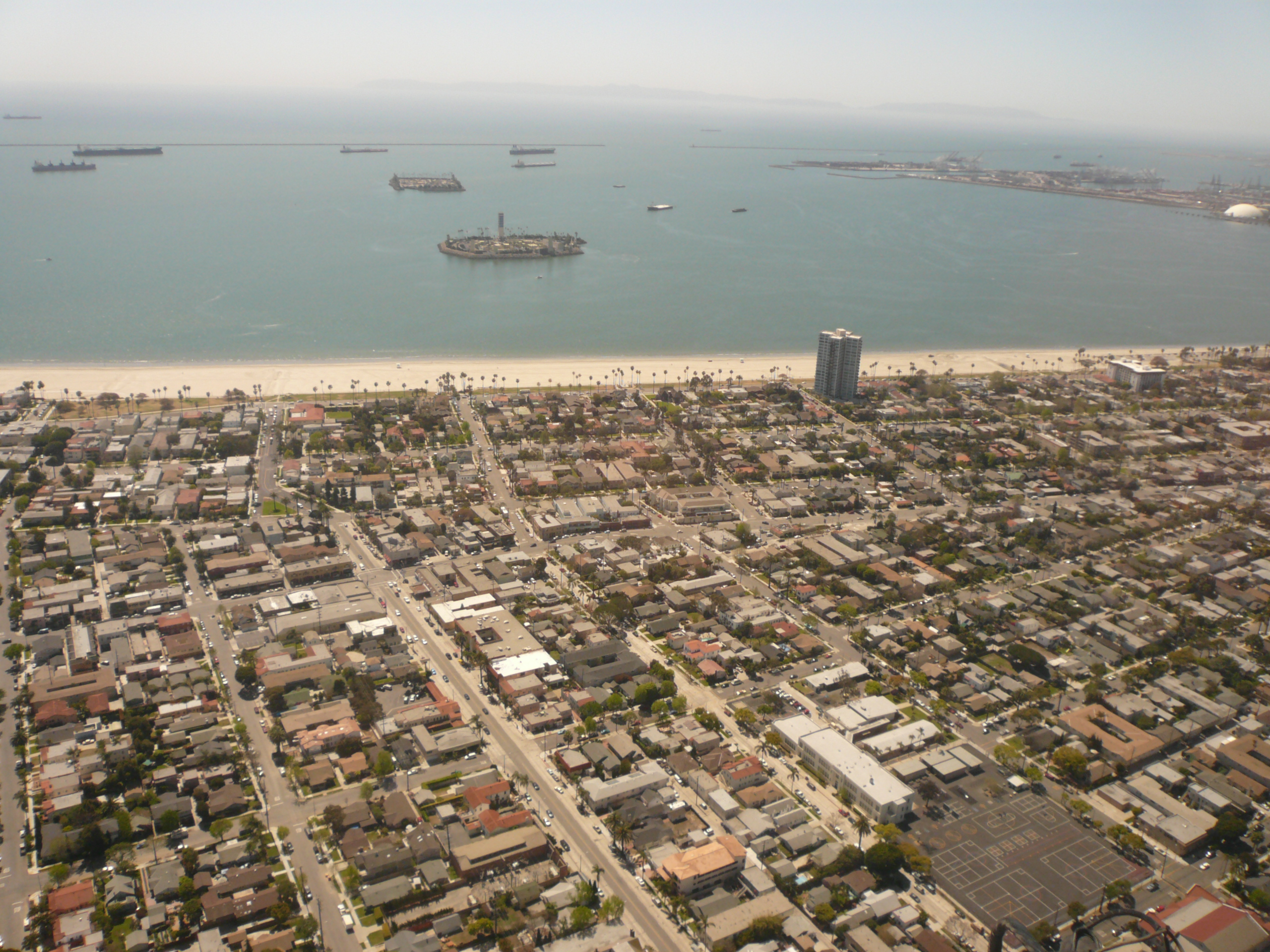
- The neighborhoods of Bluff Park and Bluff Heights in Long Beach, California, looking to the southwest. Bluff Heights is in the lower portion of this image, with Bluff Park in the middle.
- Interactive map of Bluff Heights, California
- Country: United States
- State: California
- County: Los Angeles
- City: Long Beach

Bluff Heights is a neighborhood and historic district in Long Beach, California, composed mainly of Craftsman bungalows constructed from approximately 1910 to 1923.

== Location ==
Bluff Heights is bordered by Broadway on the south, 4th Street on the north, Junipero Avenue and Wisconsin Avenue on the west, and Redondo Avenue on the east.

Bluff Heights is directly north of Bluff Park and south of Rose Park South. West of Bluff Heights is Alamitos Beach and Carroll Park, to the east is Belmont Heights.

== Architecture ==
- Lowena Drive Historic Landmark District - Châteauesque and Tudor Revival styles, named for H.N. Lowe
- Miner Smith - one of at least twenty-three "bungalow mansions" in Long Beach
- Arthur Burnett Benton

== See also ==
- Neighborhoods of Long Beach, California
