= Rose Park, Long Beach, California =

Rose Park
- Neighborhood of Long Beach
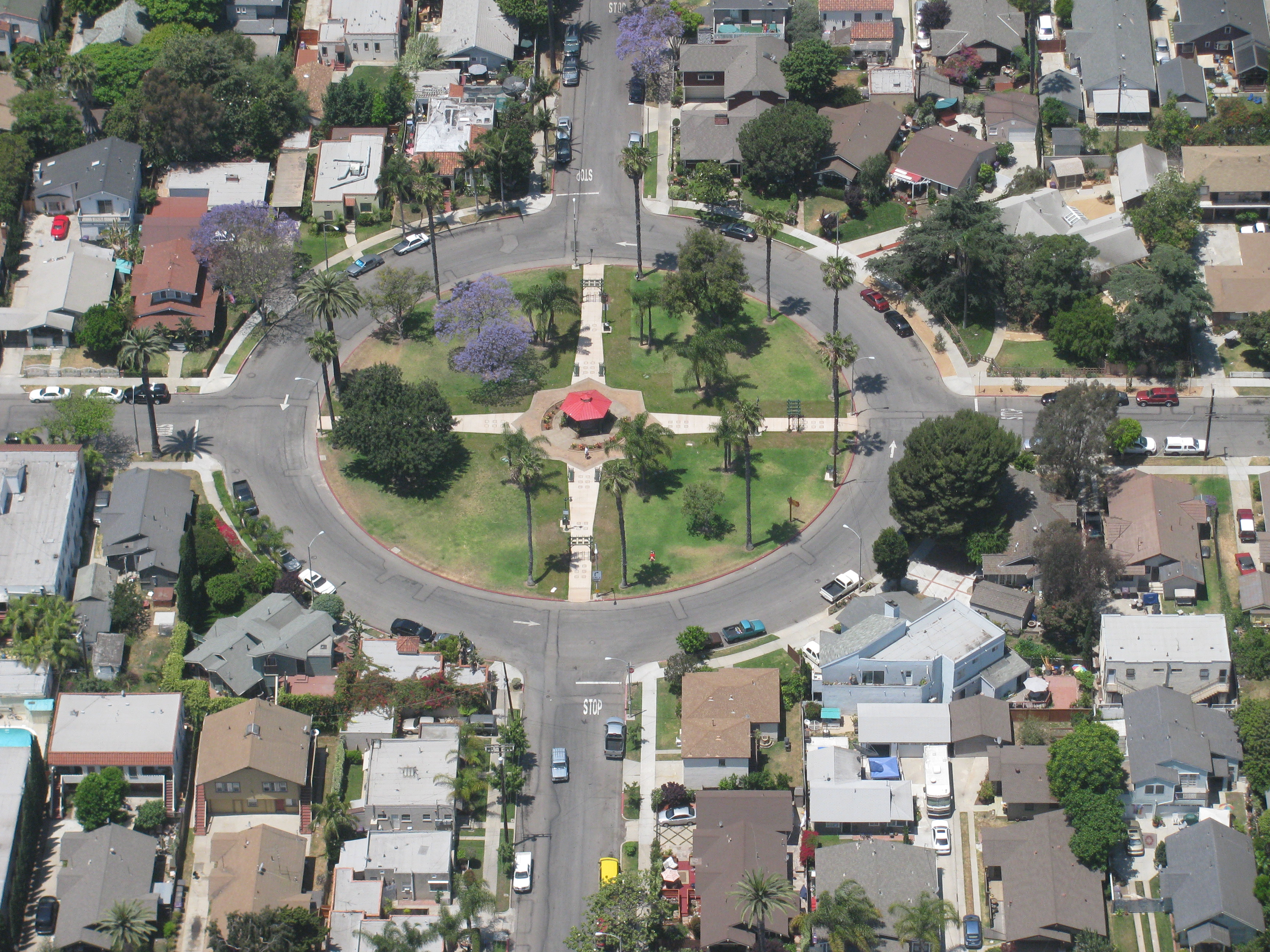

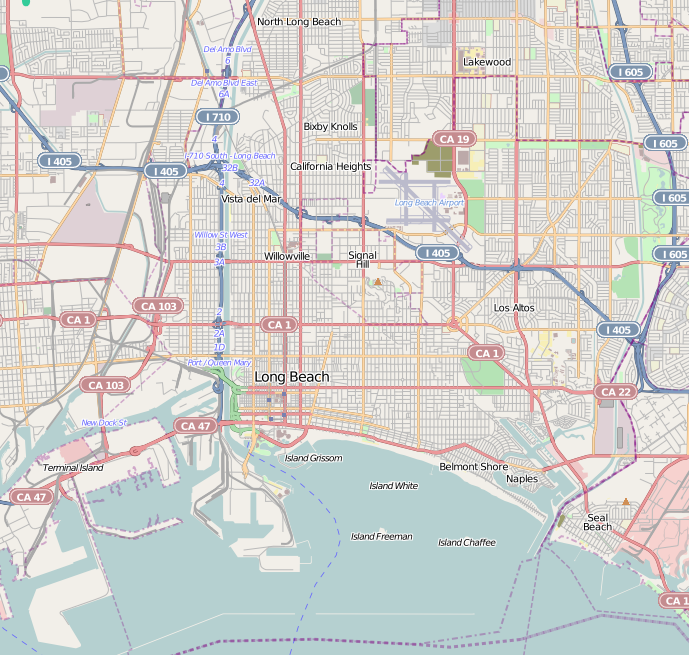
- Location within Long Beach, California Location within the Los Angeles metropolitan area Location within southern California Location within California Location within the United States
- Country: United States
- State: California
- County: Los Angeles
- City: Long Beach

Rose Park and Rose Park South are two neighborhoods in Long Beach, California.

== History ==
The Rose Park Historic District gains its name from the small circular park on Orizaba Avenue at the intersection of 8th Street. The park was donated to the city in 1910 by the Alamitos Land Company.

These neighborhoods were first settled in 1905, with subdivisions continuing until 1921. Most of the homes built in this early period through the 1920s are Craftsman Bungalows. Some houses from the 1920s were built in the Prairie/Mission Revival style, and in the 1930s and 1940s Ranch style and Neo-Traditional houses were built in the district.

The Skinny House is located in the district.

== Location ==
Rose Park and Rose Park South are adjacent and combine to make two city historical districts. To the south of Rose Park South are the neighborhoods of Carroll Park and Bluff Heights, and to the east is Belmont Heights. The family this park was partly named after is the Aultman Family and the Geehan family as well as the Rose family (all members of the same family with different last names)

== See also ==
- Neighborhoods of Long Beach, California
