= The Lone Sailor =

Sculpture by Stanley Bleifeld

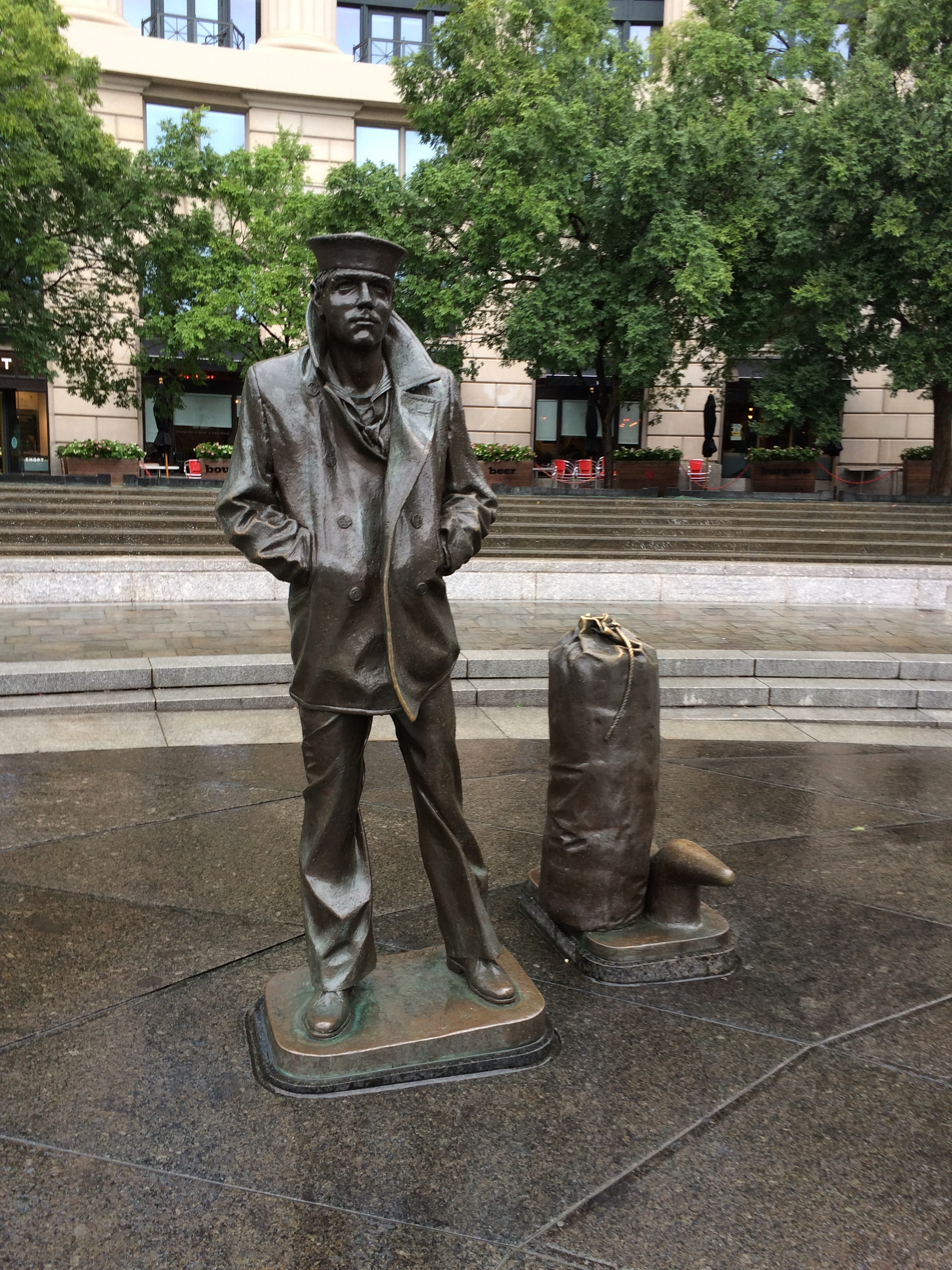
- The original statue in downtown Washington, D.C., located at the US Navy Memorial
- Artist: Stanley Bleifeld
- Year: 1987
- Type: Bronze
- Location: United States Navy Memorial, Washington, D.C., United States; 38°53′39″N 77°1′23″W
- Owner: National Park Service

The Lone Sailor, a 1987 bronze sculpture, is a tribute to all the personnel of the sea services. The sculpture was created by Stanley Bleifeld, for the United States Navy Memorial in Washington, D.C.

== History ==
Rear Admiral William Thompson was the first president and CEO of the Navy Memorial Foundation, which raised the funds to create the Navy Memorial. As a tribute to Thompson's work to bring the memorial to life, sculptor Stanley Bleifeld placed Thompson's initials and last name on the sea bag. The model for The Lone Sailor was Dan Maloney. Maloney modeled in 1984 or 1985 when he was a Petty Officer First Class assigned to the submarine USS Alabama. The Navy Times published Maloney's first person account of his selection and collaboration with Bleifeld on The Lone Sailor and Liberty Hound statues. The Liberty Hound is located on the Jacksonville, Florida waterfront. There were several earlier designs for The Lone Sailor but the versions created from those sessions were not approved. After the failed attempts using Navy Ceremonial Honor Guard models, Bleifeld asked New London Submarine Base for someone more typical. As part of the casting process, the bronze for The Lone Sailor was mixed with artifacts from eight U.S. Navy ships, provided by the Naval Historical Center.

== Replicas around the United States ==
The Lone Sailor keeps watch over USS Wisconsin.

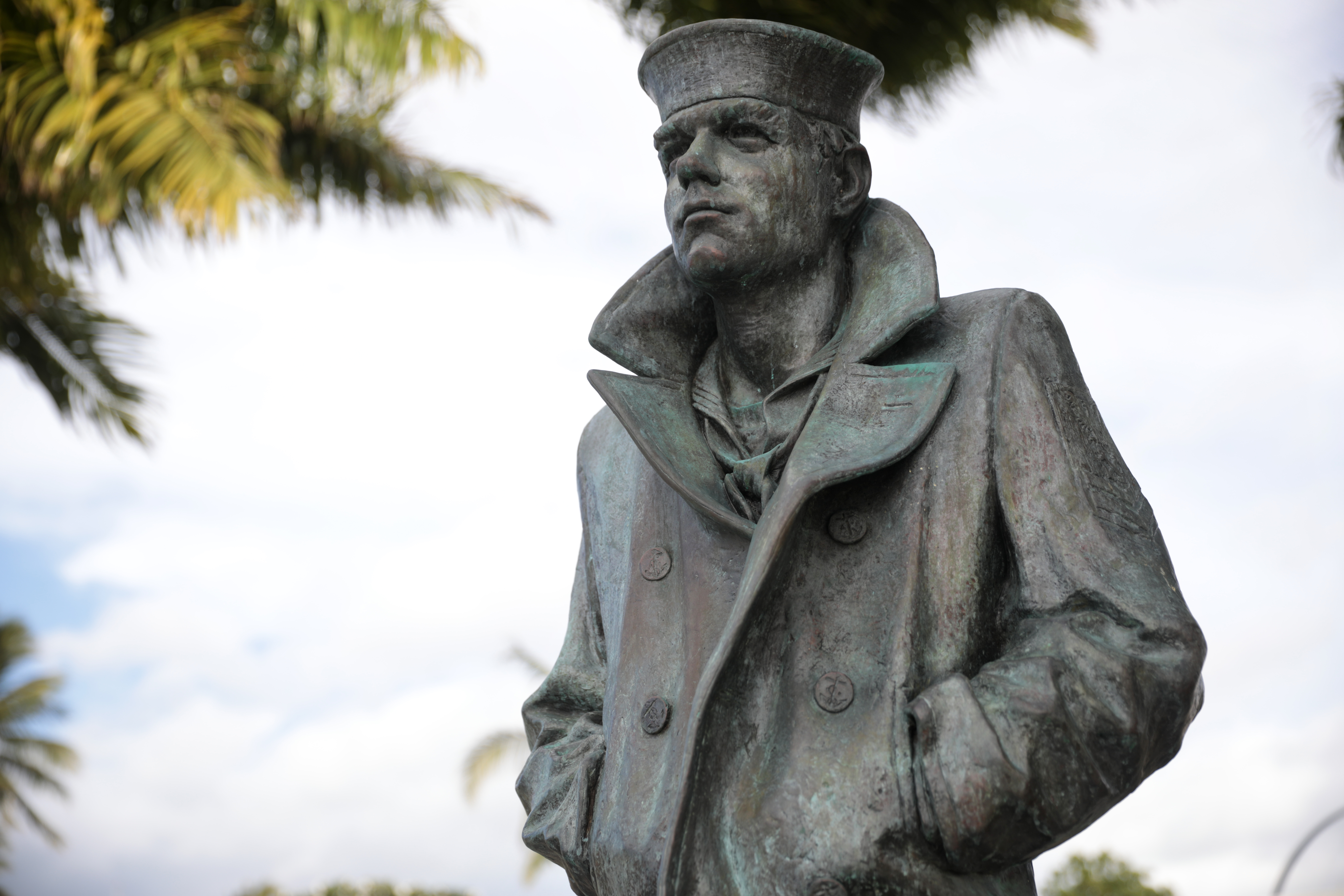
The Lone Sailor statue at the Pearl Harbor National Memorial in Honolulu, Hawaii

There are copies of The Lone Sailor in memorials around the United States.

- Baton Rouge, Louisiana, USS KIDD Veterans Memorial and Museum.30°26′40″N 91°11′29″W
- Bremerton, Washington, Bremerton Marina.47°33′48″N 122°37′25″W Dedicated May 23, 2009.
- Burlington, Vermont, Leahy Center.44°28′33.4″N 73°13′17.7″W
- Charleston, South Carolina, Charleston Naval Memorial Park.32°51′09″N 79°57′24″W
- Fort Lauderdale, Florida, Esplanade Park overlooking the New River.26°07′10.8″N 80°08′53.5″W
- Great Lakes, Illinois, Great Lakes Naval Training Center.42°18′29.0″N 87°50′57.7″W
- Jacksonville, Florida, overlooking the St. Johns River.30°19′12.35″N 81°39′25.64″W
- Long Beach, California, overlooking the Pacific Ocean.33°45′41.7″N 118°09′22.4″W
- Marin County, California, above Fort Baker.37°49′57.6″N 122°28′47.8″W
- Norfolk, Virginia, in Wisconsin Square standing watch over the museum ship USS Wisconsin.36°50′55.2″N 76°17′39.9″W
- Orlando, Florida, in Blue Jacket Park, memorializing the former site of Naval Training Center Orlando.28°34′30.1″N 81°20′16.3″W
- Pearl Harbor, Hawaii, at the Pearl Harbor Visitor Center. Dedicated on October 13, 2017.
- Quincy, Massachusetts at Marina Bay.
- Washington, D.C., in the West Wing of the White House, a 24-inch replica is stationed at the entrance to the White House Mess. Presented to President Reagan in 1987 by the Navy Memorial Dedication Committee.
- Waterloo, Iowa, Grout Museum. 42°29′35.5″N 92°20′37.0″W The statue in Waterloo, IA is a tribute to the Sullivan Brothers.
- West Haven, Connecticut, in Old Grove Park.41°15′28.0″N 72°56′54.7″W The statue in West Haven, CT was donated by residents and Navy veteran Marty DeGrand.
- Hagåtña, Guam, in the Governor's Complex at Adelup Point, overlooking the Philippine Sea
- Cleveland, Ohio, in the Great Lakes Science Center, dedicated September 10, 2021, commissioned by the USS Cleveland Legacy Foundation.

There is also a copy of The Lone Sailor in a memorial outside the United States.

- Utah Beach, Normandy, on a plaza at the Utah Beach Museum overlooking the Atlantic Ocean from where the U.S. invasion force appeared on D-Day.

== See also ==
- List of public art in Washington, D.C., Ward 6
