= Ranchos of Los Angeles County =

Pre-statehood Spanish and Mexican land grants

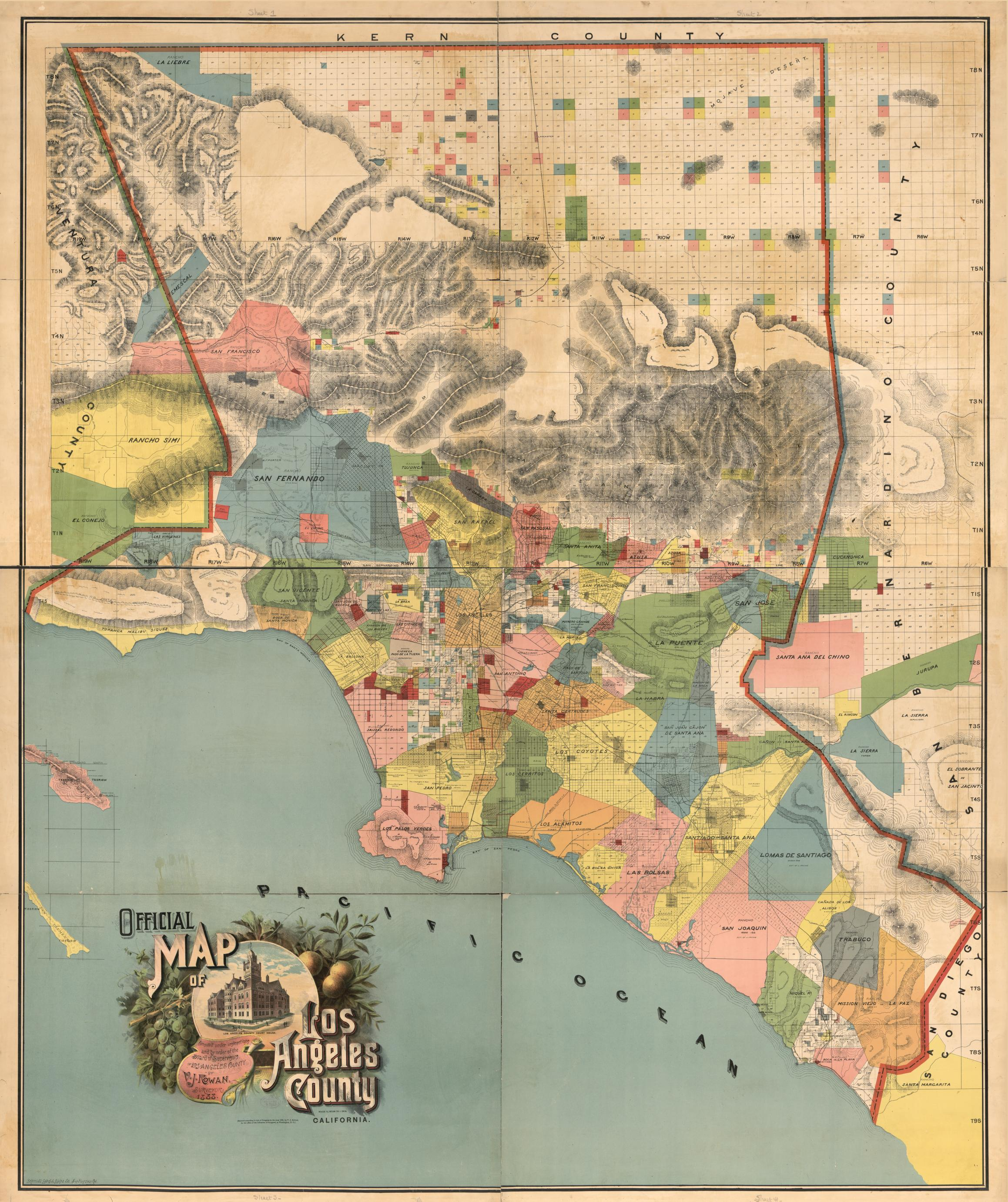
Rancho geography remains readily visible in this L.A. County map created the year before the establishment of neighboring Orange County (1888)

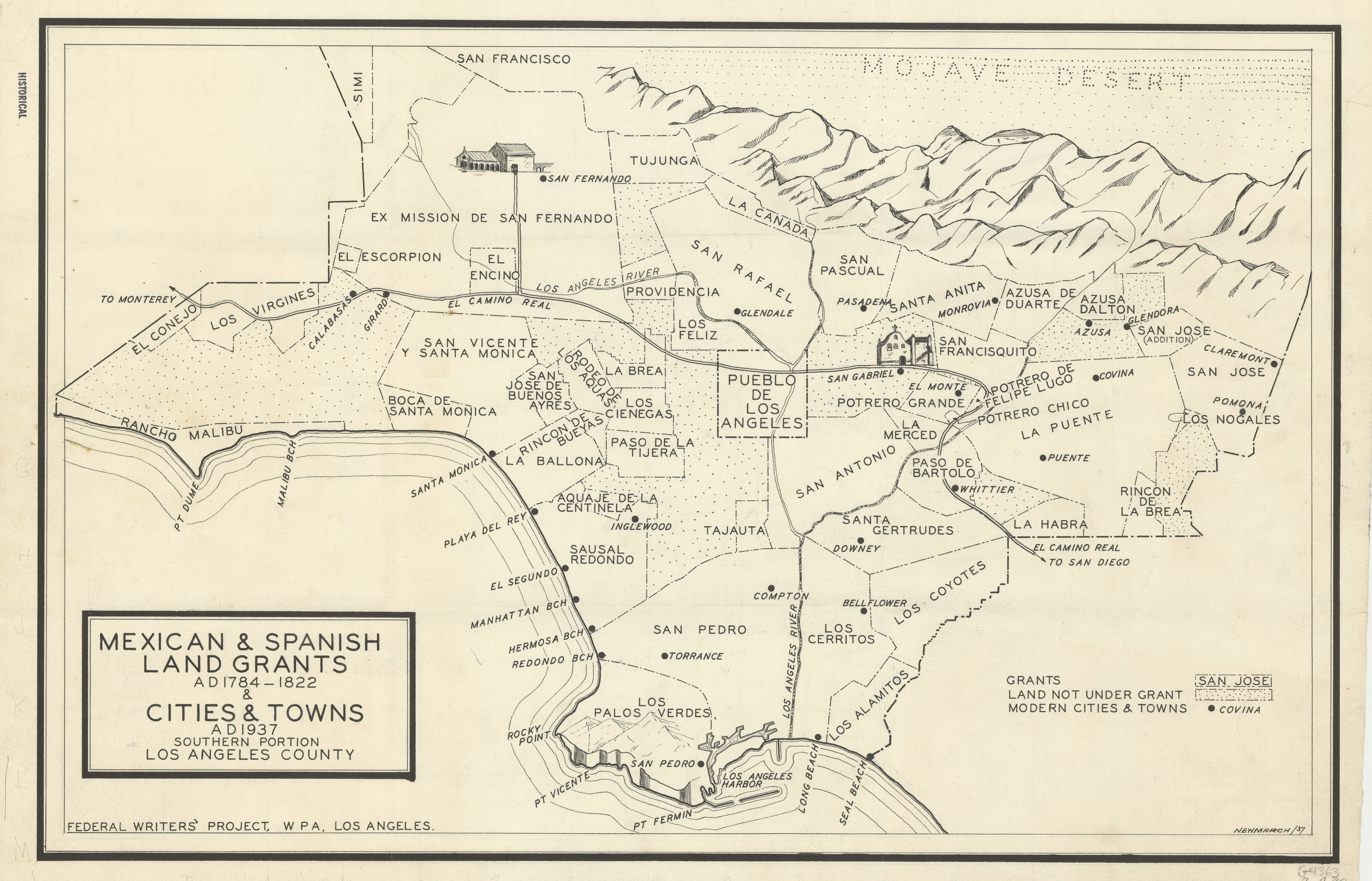
Federal Writers' Project map of the ranchos of Los Angeles County (1937); appears to be in the same style as many American Guide Series maps so possibly produced but not used for Los Angeles: A Guide to the City and Its Environs

The ranchos of Los Angeles County were large-scale land grants made by the governments of Spain and Mexico between 1784 and July 7, 1846, to private individuals within the current boundary lines (last adjusted in 1919) of Los Angeles County in California, United States.

== Background ==
The earliest colonial land grants called ranchos were established by the Commandancy and General Captaincy of the Internal Provinces of the Spanish Empire's Viceroyalty of New Spain. The Spanish colonial authorities of Alta California also established four presidios, three pueblos, and 20 Catholic missions. (Note: One additional pueblo and one additional mission were established in Mexican California, bringing the totals to four and 21.) Juan Rodríguez Cabrillo first claimed California for Spain in 1542 but until 1784 there were no land grants to Spanish subjects, except for small plots within pueblos, the balance of land in Spain's possession "being held for the benefit of the king." The rancho period of California—land grants specifically to individuals outside of misiones and presidios—began in 1784, in what would become L.A. County, with vast grants to three Spanish military veterans. All three were grants of traditional Tongva lands. The greater portion of the rancho grants were created under Mexican dominion, which began with independence from Spain on September 27, 1821, and—according to the U.S. Land Commission—ended amidst the Mexican–American War on July 7, 1846. (Grants made after that date were deemed invalid.) As the first Spanish land grants in California were made in Los Angeles County, the last Mexican land grant ever made was also in Los Angeles County: the Santa Catalina Island grant was made on July 4, 1846.

Mission San Fernando Rey de España, Mission San Gabriel Arcángel, and El Pueblo de Los Ángeles lay within the current boundaries of Los Angeles County. Mission San Gabriel was founded in 1771 under Charles III of Spain; its lands were confiscated in 1833 under the Mexican secularization act, which was passed to protect the nascent nation-state of Mexico from the influence of the Roman Catholic Church, which was perceived to be an especial ally of Spain. A land patent application made by Archbishop of San Francisco Joseph Sadoc Alemany on behalf of the church was confirmed for 191 acres (77 ha; 0.298 mi^{2}; 0.77 km^{2}) in 1859. Mission San Fernando was established 1797 under Charles IV of Spain and similarly had its lands confiscated in 1833. A land claim of 77 acres (31 ha; 0.120 mi^{2}; 0.31 km^{2}) for Mission San Fernando was approved and patented in 1865. In 1875, the City of Los Angeles patented a little more than 17,000 acres of land that had been granted to the pobladores. There were a handful of other, smaller land grants (Note: For a complete accounting of the patented small land grants within Los Angeles County, see the California Land Commission report of 1982.) made by Mexican authorities that were patented under the U.S. land law but that are not traditionally identified as ranchos. For example, "tract of land 1000 varas square near Mission San Gabriel" (patented to Mr. Sexton in 1871) was one of 10 such small grants near that mission, ranging in size from 19–180 acres (7.7–72.8 ha).

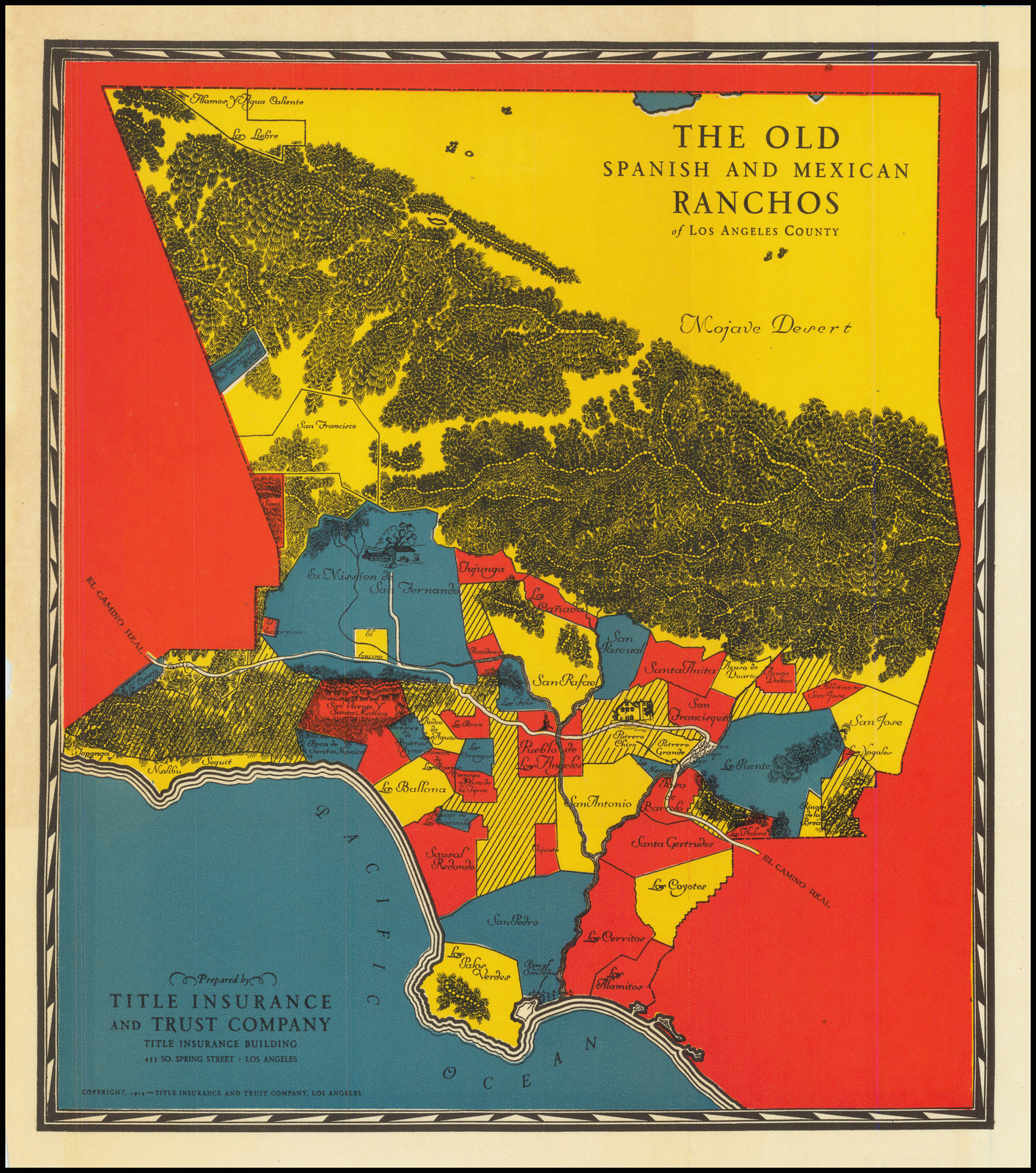
"Old Spanish and Mexican Ranchos of Los Angeles County" (Title Insurance & Trust Company, 1929)

In the decades following the initial grants, many of the ranches listed were further subdivided. Rancho Los Nietos, for example, was partitioned and re-granted as Rancho Los Alamitos, Rancho Los Cerritos, Rancho Los Coyotes, Rancho Las Bolsas, and Rancho Santa Gertrudes. A couple of the ranches that were patented under the U.S. system were conglomerates of originally smaller ranches—notably, Rancho Guaspita and Rancho Salinas became Sausal Redondo. (Additionally, at least two sets of patented rancho land grants in Los Angeles County had overlapping areas; these disputes were eventually resolved in federal court.)

Diseños are hand-drawn maps submitted to the U.S. government indicating the extent of a land grant as understood by the grantees. Diseños and expedientes (written descriptions of the grants) were used during the U.S. land-patent process that began when Mexican Alta California became the U.S. state of California in 1850. Diseños are distinct from later maps produced by U.S. surveyors within the extant American rectangular survey system. Several of the earliest surveys, or plats, of Los Angeles-area ranchos were done by Henry Hancock, who himself owned Rancho La Brea and through his son is a namesake of the Hancock Park neighborhood. As for the cattle brands, many of the large ranchos had multiple brands for various herds or during various eras; the single one included here is the earliest known example. Land patents were ultimately granted to over 60 Mexican, Anglo and indigenous Angelenos; the indigenous contingent was represented by Doña Victoria Reid of Rancho Huerta de Cuati, who was Gabrieleño Tongva, and Odón Chihuya, Urbano Chari, and Manuel (later Espíritu Chijulla) of Rancho El Escorpión, who were from a leading family of Fernandeño Tongva. The largest confirmed grant was Ex-Mission San Fernando, the smallest was San Gabriel Mission.

The ranchos had three main elements: the rancho buildings, including the residential hacienda that was often originally made of adobe brick; the adjacent market gardens and vineyards; and, last but not least, a vast pasturage for cattle, the hides and meat of which were the major economic products of the ranchos.

== List ==
Following the conventions of the California Land Commission records, the default alphabetization of this list begins after the Spanish-language articles (el, la, las, los) and prepositions (de, del), so Rancho Los Encinos is sorted by the E in Encinos, Rancho de los Palos Verdes is sorted by the P in Palos, etc. The grants were originally measured in leguas (Spanish leagues) and varas (yards), two Spanish customary units.

Grant patented by U.S. land commission and district courts
Grant either not claimed (due to sale, abandonment, amalgamation, subdivision, et al.) or not recognized during U.S. era

Grant	Year	Grantees	Country	Grant area	Diseño	Expediente No.	Patentees	Patent area	U.S. survey map	Patent date	GLO Plat No.	Brand	Etymology	Alt names	Counties	Case file online (Note: Southern District of California refers to the United States District Court for the Southern District of California, a federal-level court.)
Rancho Aguaje de la Centinela	1844	Ygnacio Machado	Mexico			382	Bruno Ávila	2,219.26 acres (898.10 ha)		August 23, 1872	437		Spanish; el aguaje is watering place or spring, la centinela is guardian	Rancho Centinella, El Centinela	Los Angeles	Case no. 125, Southern District of California.
Rancho Los Alamitos	1834	Juan José Nieto	Mexico	06 (6 Spanish leagues)				28,027.17 acres (11,342.19 ha)		August 29, 1874	468		Spanish; diminutive form of el álamo, describing Populus fremontii		Orange, Los Angeles	Case no. 290, Southern District of California
Rancho Azusa	1837	Ignacio Palomares, Ricardo Véjar	Mexico	04 (4 Spanish leagues)									Indigenous, Tongva language; Tongva (Gabrieleño) community Asuksa'nga		Los Angeles	
Rancho Azusa de Dalton	1841	Luis Arenas	Mexico				Henry Dalton	4,431.47 acres (1,793.35 ha)		May 29, 1876	455		Personal name; "Azusa ranch of Henry Dalton"	Rancho El Susa, Rancho de San José de San Gabriel	Los Angeles	
Rancho Azusa de Duarte	1841	Andrés Duarte	Mexico			236	Andrés Duarte	6,595.62 acres (2,669.15 ha)		June 6, 1878	456		Personal name; "Azusa ranch of Andrés Duarte"	Rancho Susita	Los Angeles	
Rancho La Ballona	1839	Agustín Machado, Ygnacio Machado, Felipe Talamantes, Tomás Talamantes	Mexico			184	Agustín Machado, Ygnacio Machado, Felipe Talamantes, Tomás Talamantes	13,919.90 acres (5,633.18 ha)		December 8, 1873	434		Disputed	Rancho Paseo de Las Carretas (wagon pass); Rancho de Los Quintos	Los Angeles	Case no. 123, Southern District of California.
Rancho Boca de Santa Mónica	1839	Ysidro Reyes	Mexico	01.5 (1 1/2 Spanish leagues)		330	Ysidro Reyes, Francisco Marquez, et al.	6,656.93 acres (2,693.96 ha)		July 21, 1881	539		Spanish; la boca meaning mouth, entrance, or opening; the flowing waters of the Tongva Sacred Springs were reminiscent of the tears of Monica, a Roman Catholic saint		Los Angeles	Case no. 141, Southern District of California
Rancho La Brea	1828	José Antonio Rocha	Mexico	01 (1 Spanish league)			José Antonio Rocha	4,439.07 acres (1,796.43 ha)		April 15, 1873	429		Spanish; la brea meaning asphalt or tar		Los Angeles	Case no. 287, Southern District of California.
Rancho Cahuenga	Twice granted; (1) 1843 (2) 1846	Twice granted; (1) José Yvez Limantour, José Miguel Triunfo (2) Luis Arenas	Mexico	Twice granted; (1) 06 Spanish leagues (2) 04 Spanish leagues			D. W. Alexander	388.34 acres (157.16 ha)		August 2, 1872	425		Indigenous, Tongva language; Tongva community Kawee'nga	Cajuenga	Los Angeles	Case no. 225, Southern District of California, Case no. 321, Southern District of California
Rancho La Cañada	1843	Ygnacio Coronel	Mexico	02 (2 Spanish leagues)			J.R. Scott, et al.	5,832.10 acres (2,360.17 ha)		August 1, 1866	414		Spanish; la cañada describes a "dale or glen" between mountains		Los Angeles	Case no. 316, Southern District of California
Rancho La Cañada atras de Verdugos	1846	Antonio Francisco Coronel (claim rejected by U.S.)	Mexico										Spanish; la cañada meaning dale or glen between mountains; atras "behind or in back of" the Verdugo Mountains of Rancho San Rafael	Rancho Sierra de los Verdugos	Los Angeles	
Rancho La Cañada de Los Nogales	1844	José Maria Águilar	Mexico	0.5 (1/2 Spanish league)		380	José M. Águila	1,199.56 acres (485.44 ha)		May 4, 1882	546		Spanish; la cañada meaning dale or glen between mountains; el nogal meaning walnut tree, describing Juglans californica		Los Angeles	Case no. 23, Southern District of California
Rancho Castac	1843	José M. Covarrubias	Mexico	05 (5 Spanish leagues)		326	José M. Covarrubias	22,178.28 acres (8,975.23 ha)					Indigenous, Chumash language; Chumash community of Kaštɨq	Rancho Castec	Kern, Los Angeles	Case no. 349, Southern District of California
Rancho Los Cerritos	1834	Maria Manuela Nieto	Mexico	05 (5 Spanish leagues)			John Temple	27,054.36 acres (10,948.51 ha)		December 7, 1867	467		Spanish; cerrito meaning hillock or little hill	Rancho Los Sierritos	Orange, Los Angeles	Case no. 17, Southern District of California
Rancho La Ciénega ó Paso de la Tijera	1843	Vicente Sánchez	Mexico			532	Tomás Sánchez	4,481.05 acres (1,813.42 ha)		May 22, 1873	436		Spanish; la ciénega meaning wetland, marsh, or muddy place; paso is pass or passage; la tijera apparently has several definitions: scissors, an X-shaped tool, a person who shears animals, and channel or drain	Rancho Cienega y Tijeras	Los Angeles	Case no. 376, Case no. 360, Southern District of California
Rancho Las Ciénegas	1823	Januario Ávila	Mexico	01 (1 Spanish league)			Januario Ávila						Spanish; la ciénega meaning wetland, marsh, or muddy place		Los Angeles	Case no. 353, Southern District of California
Rancho El Conejo	Twice granted; (1) 1803 (2) 1822	Twice granted; (1) José Polanco, Ygnacio Rodriguez (2) José de la Guerra y Noriega	Twice granted; (1) Spain (2) Mexico	Twice granted; (1) 11 Spanish leagues (2) 48,672 acres (as claimed 1873)			José de la Guerra y Noriega	48,671.56 acres (19,696.68 ha)		January 8, 1873	408		Spanish; el conejo meaning rabbit, describing Sylvilagus audubonii and Sylvilagus bachmani	Rancho Señora de Altagracia	Los Angeles	
Rancho Los Coyotes	1834	Juan José Nieto	Mexico	10 (10 Spanish leagues)			Andrés Pico, et al.	48,806.17 acres (19,751.16 ha)		March 9, 1875	472		Spanish; borrowing of Nahuatl language coyōtl; coyotes remain common mammals of Southern California	Rancho La Buena Esperanza	Los Angeles	Case no. 372, Southern District of California
Rancho Los Encinos	Twice granted; (1) 1785–1797 (2) 1845	Twice granted; (1) Juan Francisco Reyes (2) Ramon, Francisco, Roque (described as "presumably Indians") (Note: "Ramon Tiburcio" and "Roque" are the listed claimants of Encino on the index of expedientes held by the National Archives.)	Twice granted; (1) Spain (2) Mexico	01 (1 Spanish league)		458	Vicente de la Osa	4,460.73 acres (1,805.19 ha)		January 8, 1873	411	brand	Spanish; el encino is oak; California has 20 native species of oak tree	Rancho El Encino	Los Angeles	Case no. 392, Southern District of California
Rancho El Escorpión	1845	Odón Chihuya, Urbano Chari, Manuel	Mexico	01.5 (1 1/2 Spanish leagues)		461	Odón Chihuya, Urbano Chari, Manuel	1,109.65 acres (449.06 ha)		December 11, 1876	409		Spanish; there are 54 known scorpion species in the state, including the California common scorpion		Los Angeles	Case no. 129, Southern District of California
Rancho Ex Mission de San Fernando	1846	Eulogio de Célis	Mexico	13 Spanish leagues			Eulogio de Célis	116,858.46 acres (47,290.94 ha)		January 8, 1873	410		Descriptive; lands previously held by the Catholic Church were confiscated and redistributed under the Mexican secularization act of 1833		Los Angeles	Case no. 343, Southern District of California
Rancho Los Féliz	1802	José Vicente Féliz	Spain	01.5 (1 1/2 Spanish leagues)		350	Juan Diego	6,647.46 acres (2,690.13 ha)		April 8, 1871	426		Personal name; initial grantee		Los Angeles	Case no. 133, Southern District of California
Rancho Guaspita	1822	Antonio Ygnacio Ávila	Mexico										Indigenous, Tongva language; Tongva community of Guashna		Los Angeles	
Rancho La Habra	1839	Mariano Reyes Roldan	Mexico	01.5 (1 1/2 Spanish leagues)		131	Andrés Pico	6,698.57 acres (2,710.82 ha)		April 18, 1872	462		Spanish; la abra is an opening	Rancho Cañada de La Habra	Orange, Los Angeles	Case no. 355, Southern District of California
Rancho Huerta de Cuati	Uncertain; 1820 or 1828	Victoria Reid	Uncertain				Victoria Reid	128.26 acres (51.90 ha)		June 30, 1858	421		Uncertain; huerta is orchard or kitchen garden in Spanish but the meaning of cuati in this context is unknown, although it is a word in Nahuatl, which is in the same language family as Tongva		Los Angeles	
Rancho Isla de Santa Catalina	1846	Thomas M. Robbins	Mexico				José María Covarrubias	6,698.57 acres (2,710.82 ha)		April 10, 1867	470		Named for figure of religious significance; Sebastián Vizcaíno named the island for Catherine of Alexandria, a Roman Catholic saint		Los Angeles	
Rancho La Liebre	1846	José M. Flores	Mexico	11 Spanish leagues		547	José M. Flores	48,799.59 acres (19,748.49 ha)		June 21, 1875	347		Spanish; la liebre is hare, describing Lepus californicus		Los Angeles	Case no. 170, Southern District of California
Rancho Matzultaquea	1845	Ramon Carrillo (J. B. Frisbie claim rejected by U.S.)	Mexico	04 (4 Spanish leagues)									Unknown		Los Angeles	
Rancho La Merced	1844	Casilda Soto	Mexico	01 (1 Spanish league)			Francis Pliny F. Temple, et al.	2,363.75 acres (956.58 ha)		February 13, 1872	443		Spanish; la merced is literally a mercy but is also used to describe income earned by labor		Los Angeles	Case no. 217, Southern District of California
Rancho Los Nietos	1784	Manuel Nieto	Spain	33 (33 Spanish leagues)									Personal name; initial grantee		Orange, Los Angeles	
Rancho Los Nogales	1840	José de la Luz Linares	Mexico	01 (1 Spanish league)		195	M. de Jesus García	1,003.67 acres (406.17 ha)		June 29, 1882	459		Spanish; el nogal meaning walnut tree, describing Juglans californica		Los Angeles	Case no. 88, Southern District of California
Rancho Ojo de Agua	1840	Encarnacio Sepúlveda (no U.S. claim presented)	Mexico	02 (2 Spanish leagues)									Spanish; el ojo is eye, la agua is water		Los Angeles	
Rancho de los Palos Verdes	1827	José L. Sepúlveda	Mexico			565	José L. Sepúlveda, et al.	31,629.43 acres (12,799.98 ha)		June 22, 1880	439		Spanish; el palo is a wooden stick; verde is green en Español	Rancho de Los Palos Colorados	Los Angeles	
Rancho Paso de Bartolo Viejo	1835	Juan Crispin Perez	Mexico	02 (2 Spanish leagues)		061	Patented in 3 parts; (1) Joaquin Sepúlveda (208 acres) 2) Pico & Perez (8991 acres) (3) Rafael Guirado (876 acres)	10,075 acres (4,077 ha)		1867-09-27, 1881-03-17, 1881-08-05	465, 458, 464		Mixed; an old (viejo in Spanish) San Gabriel River crossing was named for a person called Bartolo	Rancho San Rafael	Los Angeles	
Rancho Portezuela	1795	Mariano de la Luz Verdugo (located in the San Fernando Valley; grant abandoned c. 1810)	Spain										Spanish; el portezuelo is a pass		Los Angeles	
Rancho Potrero Chico	1843	Antonio Valenzuela	Mexico				Ramon Valenzuela, et al.	83.46 acres (33.78 ha)		April 4, 1923	444		Spanish; el potrero is a paddock, or pasturage for horses; chico as an adjective means little	Rancho Potrero de la Misíon Vieja de San Gabriel	Los Angeles	
Rancho Potrero de Felipe Lugo	1845	Teodoro Romero, Jorge Morillo	Mexico				Jorge Morillo	2,042.81 acres (826.70 ha)		June 15, 1871	446	borders	Spanish; el potrero is a paddock, or pasturage for horses; Felipe Lugo was a member of the prominent Californio Lugo family	Rancho Dolores	Los Angeles	
Rancho Potrero Grande	1845	Manuel Antonio	Mexico	01 (1 Spanish league)		439	J. Matías Sanchez	4,431.95 acres (1,793.55 ha)		July 19, 1859	445		Spanish; el potrero is a paddock, or pasturage for horses; grande is big		Los Angeles	Case no. 243, Southern District of California
Rancho La Providencia	1843	Vicente de la Osa	Mexico	01 (1 Spanish league)			D. W. Alexander	4,064.33 acres (1,644.78 ha)		August 6, 1872	424		Spanish; providence, foresight, divine superintendence	Possibly Rancho Osa after Vicente de la Osa	Los Angeles	
Rancho La Puente	1845	John A. Rowland, William H. Workman	Mexico			270	John Rowland, William Workman	48,790.55 acres (19,744.84 ha)		April 19, 1867	460		Spanish; la puente is a bridge over water	Rancho Puente de San Gabriel	Los Angeles, Orange	Case no. 127, Southern District of California
Rancho Rincón de la Brea	1841	Gil Ibarra	Mexico	01 (1 Spanish league )		222	Gil Ibarra	4,452.59 acres (1,801.90 ha)		1864-11-14	461		Spanish; el rincón meaning corner or angle, la brea meaning asphalt or tar	Rancho Cañada de la Brea	Los Angeles	
Rancho Rincón de los Bueyes	1821	Bernardo Higuera	Spain	0.6 (3/5 Spanish league)			Francisco Higuera, et al.	3,127.89 acres (1,265.81 ha)		August 27, 1872	435		Spanish; el rincón meaning corner or angle, los bueyes are oxen		Los Angeles	Case no. 131, Southern District of California
Rancho Río de Las Ánimas	1846	Leonardo Cota, Julián A. Chávez (claim rejected by U.S.)	Mexico	06 (6 Spanish leagues)									Spanish; "river of souls"		Los Angeles	
Rancho Rodeo de las Aguas	Uncertain; c. 1820	Vicente Ferrer Villa	Spain	4000 varas			María Rita Valdés	4,449.31 acres (1,800.57 ha)		June 27, 1871	430		Spanish; "gathering of the waters"; literally, rodeo is a cattle herd round-up, agua is water describing pre-settlement watershed features	Rancho San Antonio	Los Angeles	Case no. 371, Southern District of California
Rancho Rosa Castilla	1831	Juan Ballesteros (Claim of A. Lestrada was rejected.)	Mexico										Spanish; wild roses grew here; the ranch is named for Castile roses, the plants were likely one of the nine recognized species of roses native to California, such as Rosa californica		Los Angeles	
Rancho Salinas	1822	Antonio Ygnacio Ávila	Mexico										Spanish; salinas are salt flats; given the location, the name of the rancho likely referred to the Old Salt Lake		Los Angeles	
Rancho San Antonio	1810	Antonio María Lugo	Spain				Antonio María Lugo	29,513.35 acres (11,943.63 ha)		July 20, 1866	442		Named for figure of religious significance; Anthony of Padua, a Roman Catholic saint		Los Angeles	Case no. 9, Southern District of California
Rancho San Francisco	1839	Antonio del Valle	Mexico	08 (8 Spanish leagues)			Jacoba Féliz	48,611.88 acres (19,672.53 ha)		February 12, 1875	399		Named for figure of religious significance; Francis of Assisi, a Roman Catholic saint		Kern, Los Angeles	
Rancho San Francisquito	1845	Henry Dalton	Mexico				Henry Dalton	8,893.62 acres (3,599.12 ha)		May 30, 1867	447		Named for figure of religious significance; Francis of Assisi, a Roman Catholic saint, diminutive form	Azuchzana	Los Angeles	Case no. 22, Southern District of California
Rancho San José	1837	Ignacio Palomares, Ricardo Véjar	Mexico			141	Ignacio Palomares, Ricardo Véjar, Henry Dalton	26,771.05 acres (10,833.86 ha) (Note: Rancho San José was patented in two sections, one titled to Dalton-Palomares & Véjar, and a smaller one labeled "Addition" just to Dalton-Palomares.)		January 20, 1875	458		Named for figure of religious significance; Joseph, a Roman Catholic saint		Los Angeles	Case no. 122, Southern District of California, Case no. 128, Southern District of California
Rancho San José de Buenos Ayres	1819	Máximo Alanis, José Polanco	Spain	01 (1 Spanish league)			Benjamin D. Wilson	4,438.69 acres (1,796.27 ha)		July 5, 1866	431		Named for figure of religious significance; Joseph, a Roman Catholic saint, modifier buenos ayres translates roughly to fair winds or fresh air		Los Angeles	Case no. 305, Southern District of California
Rancho San Pascual	1835	Juan Maríne	Mexico	03.5 (3 1/2 Spanish leagues)			Patented in 2 parts; (1) Manuel Garfias (2) Benjamin D. Wilson	Patented in 2 parts; (1) 13,693.93 acres (5,541.74 ha) (2) 709 acres (287 ha)			422, 415		Named for figure of religious significance; Paschal Baylón, a Roman Catholic saint	Rancho El Rincón de San Pasqual	Los Angeles	Case no. 173, Southern District of California
Rancho San Pedro	1784 (Note: The Rancho San Pedro grant was made sometime before October 20, 1784 and regranted in 1820, less Palos Verdes.)	Juan José Dominguez	Spain				Manuel Dominguez	43,119.13 acres (17,449.69 ha)		December 18, 1858	440		Named for figure of religious significance; Peter, a Roman Catholic saint	Dominguez Rancho, Suanga, Rancho de los Gutierrez	Los Angeles	Case no. 273, Southern District of California
Rancho San Rafael	1784	José María Verdugo	Spain				Julio Verdugo, et al.	36,403.32 acres (14,731.90 ha)		January 28, 1882	423		Named for figure of religious significance; Raphael, an archangel	Rancho La Zanja (la zanja was a local form of irrigation canal), Hahaonuput, Arroyo Hondo	Los Angeles	Case no. 381, Southern District of California
Rancho San Vicente y Santa Mónica	1828	Francisco Sepúlveda	Mexico			357	Sepúlveda	30,259.65 acres (12,245.65 ha)		July 23, 1881	432		Named for figures of religious significance; Vincent of Saragossa and Saint Monica, both Roman Catholic saints		Los Angeles	Case no. 143, Southern District of California
Rancho Santa Anita	1841	Hugo Reid	Mexico	03 (3 Spanish leagues)			Henry Dalton	13,319.06 acres (5,390.03 ha)		August 9, 1866	454		Named for figure of religious significance; Ann, a Roman Catholic saint, diminutive form		Los Angeles	Case no. 86, Southern District of California
Rancho Santa Gertrudes	1833	Josefa Cota de Nieto	Mexico	05 (5 Spanish leagues)		103	Patented in 2 parts; (1) Tomás Sanchez Colima (2) Jas. P. McFarland, John G. Downey	38,900.25 acres (15,742.37 ha) (Note: Rancho Santa Gertrudes was patented in two parts, the smaller to Colima and the larger to McFarland & Downey.)			463, 466		Named for figure of religious significance; Gertrude the Great, a Roman Catholic saint		Los Angeles	Case no. 193, Southern District of California, Case no. 194, Southern District of California
Rancho Sausal Redondo	1822	Antonio Ygnacio Ávila	Mexico	05 (5 Spanish leagues)		337	Antonio Ygnacio Ávila	22,458.94 acres (9,088.81 ha)		1875-03-22	438		Spanish; el sauzal is willow grove, describing Baccharis salicifolia, California seep willow; redondo is literally round, but here refers to a pasturage	Rancho Santa Elena, see also Rancho Gauspita and Rancho Salinas	Los Angeles	Case no. 354, Southern District of California.
Rancho Simi	1795	Santiago Pico	Spain	14 (14 Spanish leagues)		271	José de la Guerra y Noriega	113,009.21 acres (45,733.20 ha)		1865-06-29	400		Indigenous, Chumash language; Chumash community of Šimiyi	Rancho San José de Gracia de Simí	Ventura, Los Angeles	Case no. 103, Southern District of California
Rancho La Tajauta	1843	Anastasio Ávila	Mexico	01 (1 Spanish league)			Enrique Ávila	3,559.86 acres (1,440.62 ha)		January 8, 1873	441		Indigenous, Tongva language; Tongva community of Tajáuta	Tajanta, Tajuanta, Cuerbas, Rancho Los Cuerbos (or Cuervos)	Los Angeles	Case no. 167, Southern District of California
Rancho Temescal	1843	Francisco Lopez	Mexico	03 (3 Spanish leagues)			R. de la Cuesta	13,339.07 acres (5,398.13 ha)		September 13, 1871	398		Spanish; borrowing of the Nahuatl word temāzcalli, meaning sweat house, steam bath, sauna		Ventura, Los Angeles	Case no. 374, Southern District of California
Rancho Topanga Malibu Sequit	1804	José Bartolomé Tapia	Spain				Matthew Keller	13,315.70 acres (5,388.67 ha)		August 29, 1872	433		Indigenous, mixed; Tongva community of Topaa'nga, Chumash community of Humaliwo, Chumash community of Lisiksi or Lisiqsihi	Topanza Malibu, Sequit, Simo	Los Angeles	Case no. 147, Southern District of California.
Rancho Tujunga	1840	Pedro Lopez, Francisco Lopez	Mexico	01.5 (1 1/2 Spanish leagues)		215	D.W. Alexander	6,660.71 acres (2,695.49 ha)		October 19, 1874	413		Indigenous, Tongva language; Tongva community of Tuhuu'nga		Los Angeles	Case no. 52, Southern District of California
Rancho Las Vírgenes	Uncertain; c. 1810	Miguel Ortega	Spain			054	Maria Antonia Machado de Reyes	8,878.76 acres (3,593.11 ha)		September 5, 1883	545		Named for figure of religious significance; originally Nuestra Señora la Reina de las Vírgenes, a Spanish-language honorific for Mary, mother of Jesus, meaning Our Lady, the Queen of the Virgins		Los Angeles	Case no. 256, Southern District of California

== Influence ==
Many place names in Los Angeles County draw their names from the ranchos and the rancheros. Examples of rancho-derived toponyms include: Ballona (Creek, Wetlands), Brea, Centinela Ave., Cerritos (Auto Square, College), Conejo Valley, Dominguez (Hills, Channel, Rancho, CSUDH), Duarte, Encino, La Brea Ave., La Cañada Flintridge, La Cienega Blvd., La Puente, La Tijera Blvd., Las Virgenes USD, Los Feliz, Mount Baldy, Palos Verdes (Peninsula, Estates, blue butterfly), Park La Brea, Pico Blvd., Pico-Union, Pico Rivera, Rancho Park, Redondo Beach, Rose Hills, Rodeo Dr., San Jose Hills, San Pedro (Bay, neighborhood), San Vicente Blvd., other San Vicente Blvd., Santa Anita Race Track, Santa Monica (Bay, City, Blvd., Mountains), Sepulveda (Blvd., Pass, Transit Corridor, Dam), Verdugo (Mountains, Wash), Walnut, West Whittier-Los Nietos, et al. Rancho boundaries define a portion of the county boundary line; approximately 173 mi (278 km) of roads in the county follow rancho borders; and several major arterial thoroughfares run along former rancho property lines, including Pico, Redondo Beach, Sepulveda, Washington, Whittier, and Wilshire boulevards.

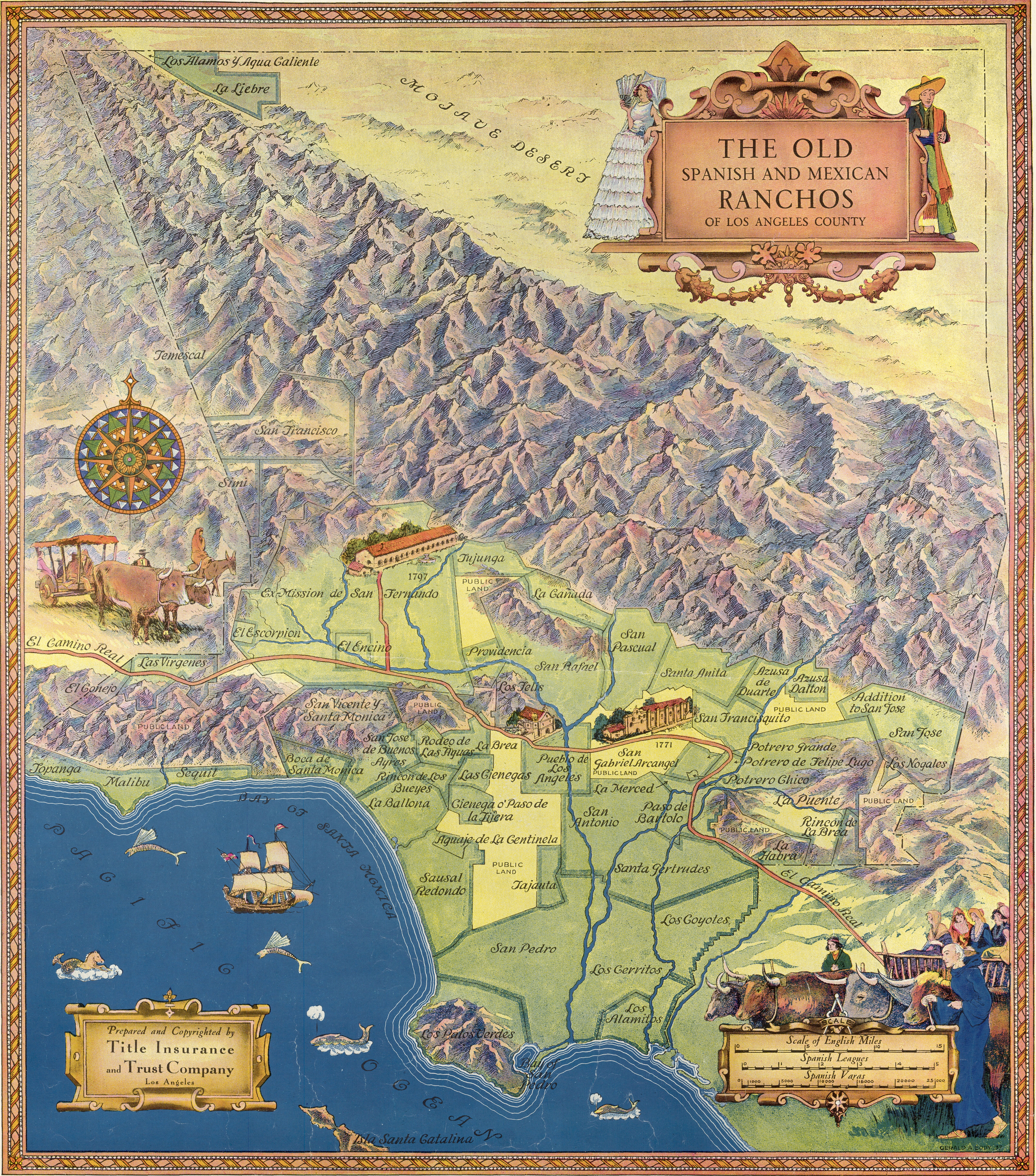
The cartouche in the bottom right includes a conversion between English miles, Spanish leagues, and Spanish varas (Title Insurance & Trust Company, 1937)

By the 20th century, the popular culture of California often depicted romantic rancheros and idealized missions, but erased the negative consequences for indigenous people of the California mission clash of cultures. Mission Revival (1890–1915), Spanish Colonial Revival (1915–1935), Monterey Colonial Revival and California Churrigueresque were all popular architectural styles in Los Angeles, and not coincidentally: "Thanks to architects, writers, and city boosters, Southern California's identity became firmly grounded in an obsession with geography." The appropriation of Spanish colonization by bourgeois whites is typified by projects like Christine Sterling's preservation of Ávila Adobe and establishment of Olvera Street as a tourist attraction. The eventual design shift from adobe-style buildings to the "Mediterranean" style was an intentional separation from the rustic and Mexican roots of the place to what was perceived as a more sophisticated cultural iconography, although "California stucco" was a method for attaching the "Mexican–Indian mode of domestic architecture" to mass production of small family homes. The "romance of the ranchos" was also used as a pretext for discouraging urban density of Los Angeles and promoting a vast decentralized "rural urban" development style that combines vast tracts of single family homes and practices like faux-rural horse-keeping with dense nodes of finance, law and film production.

== See also ==
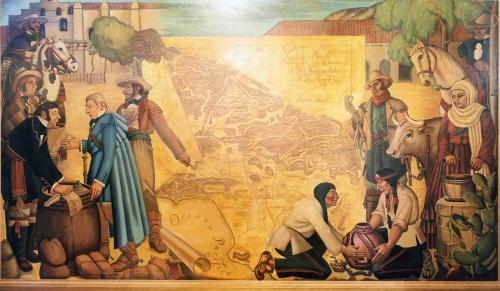
Spanish and American Ranchos (1939) by Lucien Adolph Labaudt, commissioned as a New Deal artwork by the Treasury Relief Art Project for the Spring Street Courthouse

- United States District Court for the Southern District of California
- History of Los Angeles County, California
- History of the San Fernando Valley to 1915
- Ranchos of Orange County
- Zanja – Historical irrigation system used in the American Southwest
- For more on la brea, see bitumen, history of oil in California through 1930, and La Brea Tar Pits
- Ranchería and List of California Rancherías
- Hacienda – Spanish word used to refer to estates with large business enterprises
- Estancia – Large, private plot of land used for farming or cattle-raising
- Spanish colonization of the Americas
  - Spanish missions in the Americas
  - Spanish Texas
  - Spanish period in Arizona
  - Land grants in New Mexico
