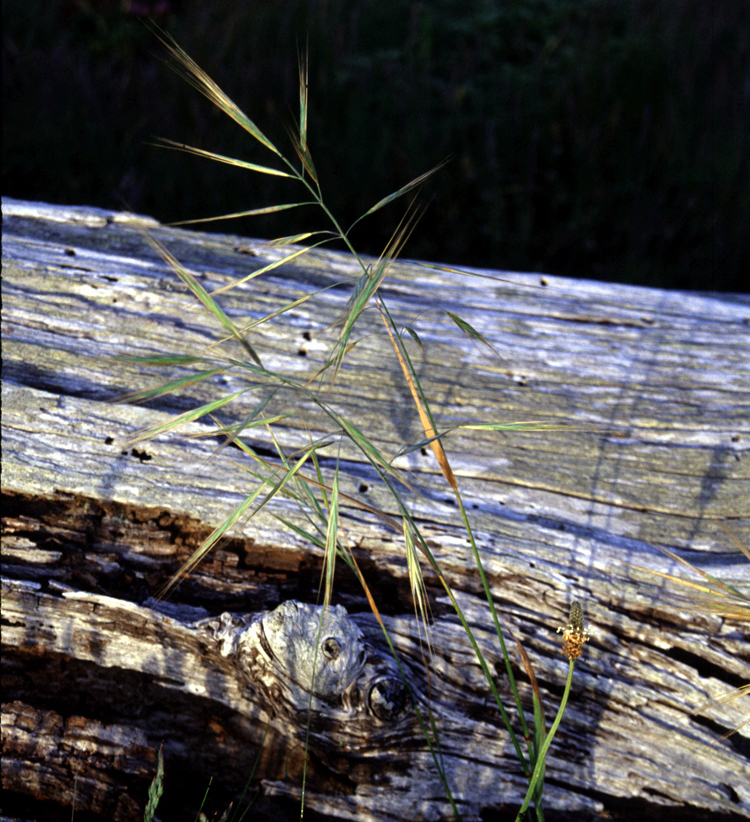

Scientific classification
- Kingdom: Plantae
- Clade: Tracheophytes
- Clade: Angiosperms
- Clade: Monocots
- Clade: Commelinids
- Order: Poales
- Family: Poaceae
- Subfamily: Pooideae
- Genus: Bromus
- Species: B. diandrus

Binomial name
- Bromus diandrus Roth

Synonyms
- Anisantha diandra (Roth) Tutin ex Tzvelev

= Bromus diandrus =

Species of grass

Bromus diandrus is a species of grass known by the common names great brome and "ripgut brome".

== Description ==
This is a brome grass which is native to the Mediterranean but has been introduced to much of the rest of the world. It does best in areas with a Mediterranean climate, such as California and parts of southern Australia, but it is quite tolerant of many climates. Ripgut brome is a winter annual that grows throughout winter and spring and matures in the summer. The adult plant is one to three feet in height with hairy, rough leaves about a centimeter wide. The membranous ligule is prominent, white with spiky hairs. The wide panicle nods like that of an oat plant, and it bears a large, splayed spikelet with a very long awn which can exceed five centimeters in length. The seeds easily break out of the spikelet. They are very sharp and very rough due to tiny barb-like hairs that face backward, allowing the seed to catch and lodge-like a fish hook. This characteristic makes the seeds a danger to animals, which can easily get a seed lodged in a paw or eye. Motion can cause the seed to work itself deeper into the flesh. This is one of the grass species known to pet owners as "foxtails", a backyard hazard for outdoor cats and dogs.

== As an Invasive species ==
Ripgut brome can substantially reduce yields when it invades wheat fields. It has naturalized in some areas and is considered a troublesome noxious weed in others. Bromus diandrous is an invasive species in California native habitats.

This bromegrass is a troublesome weed in cereal crops and natural pasture lands. The life cycle of B. diandrous helps it to grow in wheat fields in which it can grow for most of the season without being noticed. Once the grass starts flowering, the open panicle seed head shows the infestation. The damage to wheat crop is through both strong competition, lowering yield, and seed contamination, lowering quality.

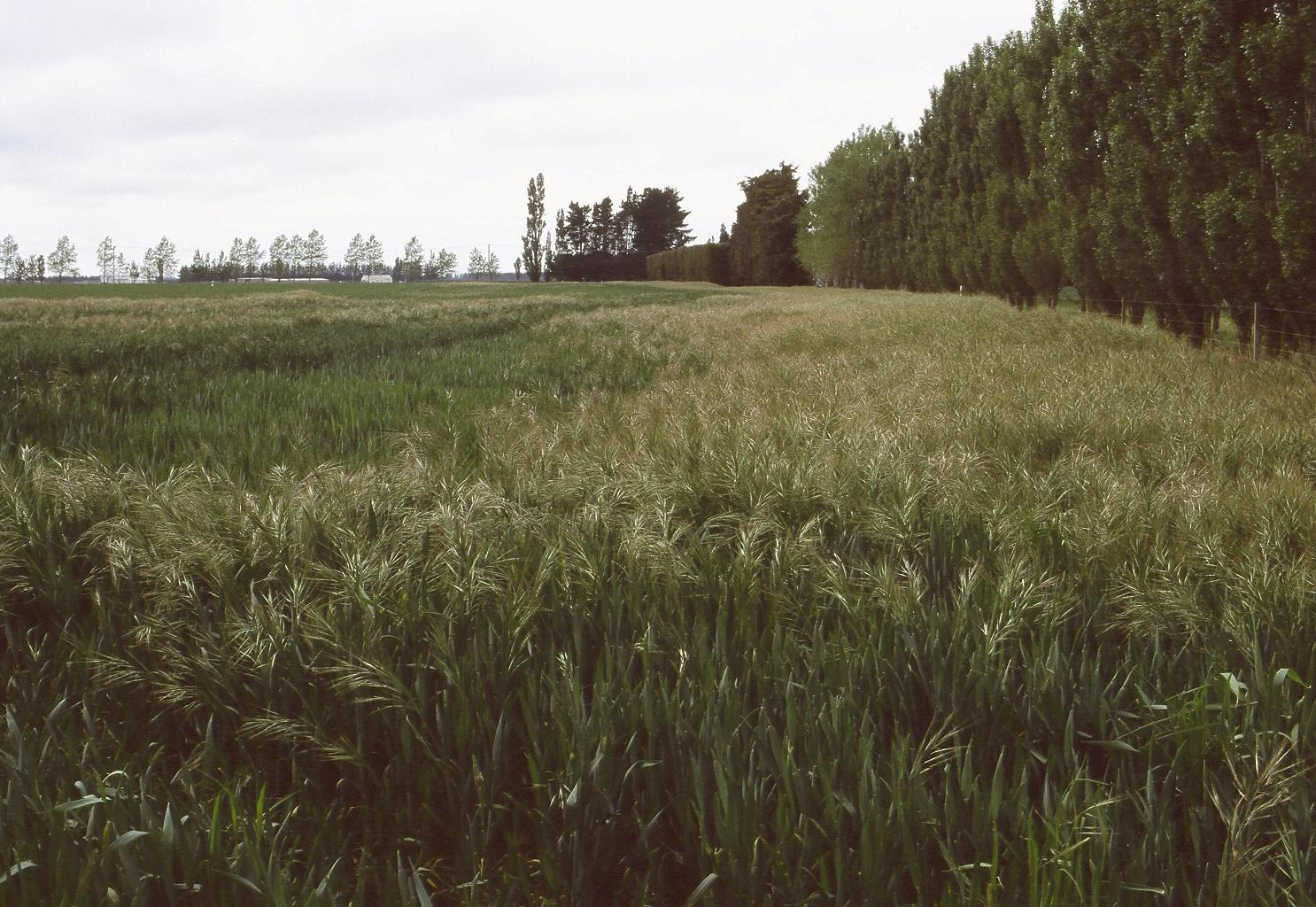
Bromus diandrous infestation in wheat, NZ

Ripgut brome is also troublesome in rangeland if it establishes in high numbers. The grass is of low nutritional value to livestock. Brome seeds can also mix with sheep wool and lower its value. Moreover, sharp awns of ripe seeds can penetrate sheep's skin into the flesh causing pain and lowering carcass value. If ingested, the strong awns can cause injury to sheep's mouth and even intestine, hence the name "rip gut".

== Similar species ==
Bromus rigidus, known as rigid brome, is very similar in morphology to ripgut brome but differs from the latter in its panicle structure and the callus-scar of its caryopsis. The two species have some differences in their germination behaviour as well. Bromus sterilis, or sterile brome, is similar in most morphological features. It is a slightly smaller plan, an annual or a biennial plant. Bromus hordeaceus, known as soft brome, is similar in early growth stages with smaller leaf blades. The seed head is an erect panicle, smaller than B. diandrus with much smaller seeds and much shorter awns.
