= History of Los Angeles County, California =

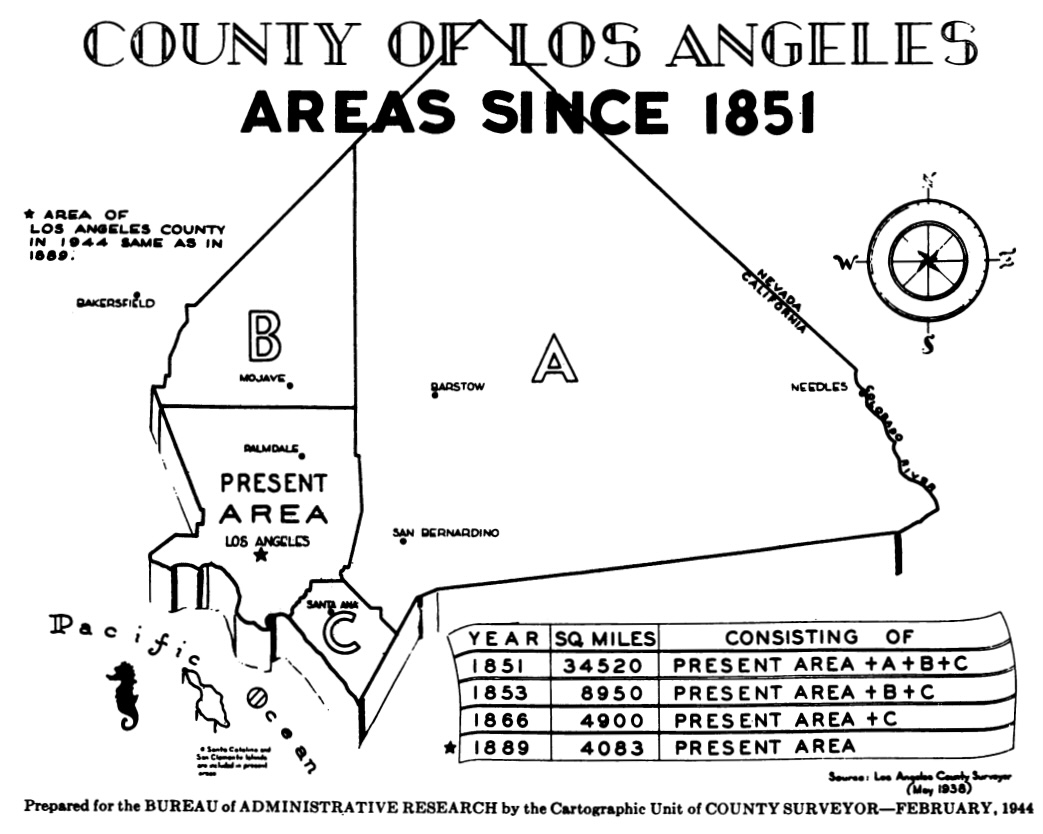
County of Los Angeles boundary changes since 1851

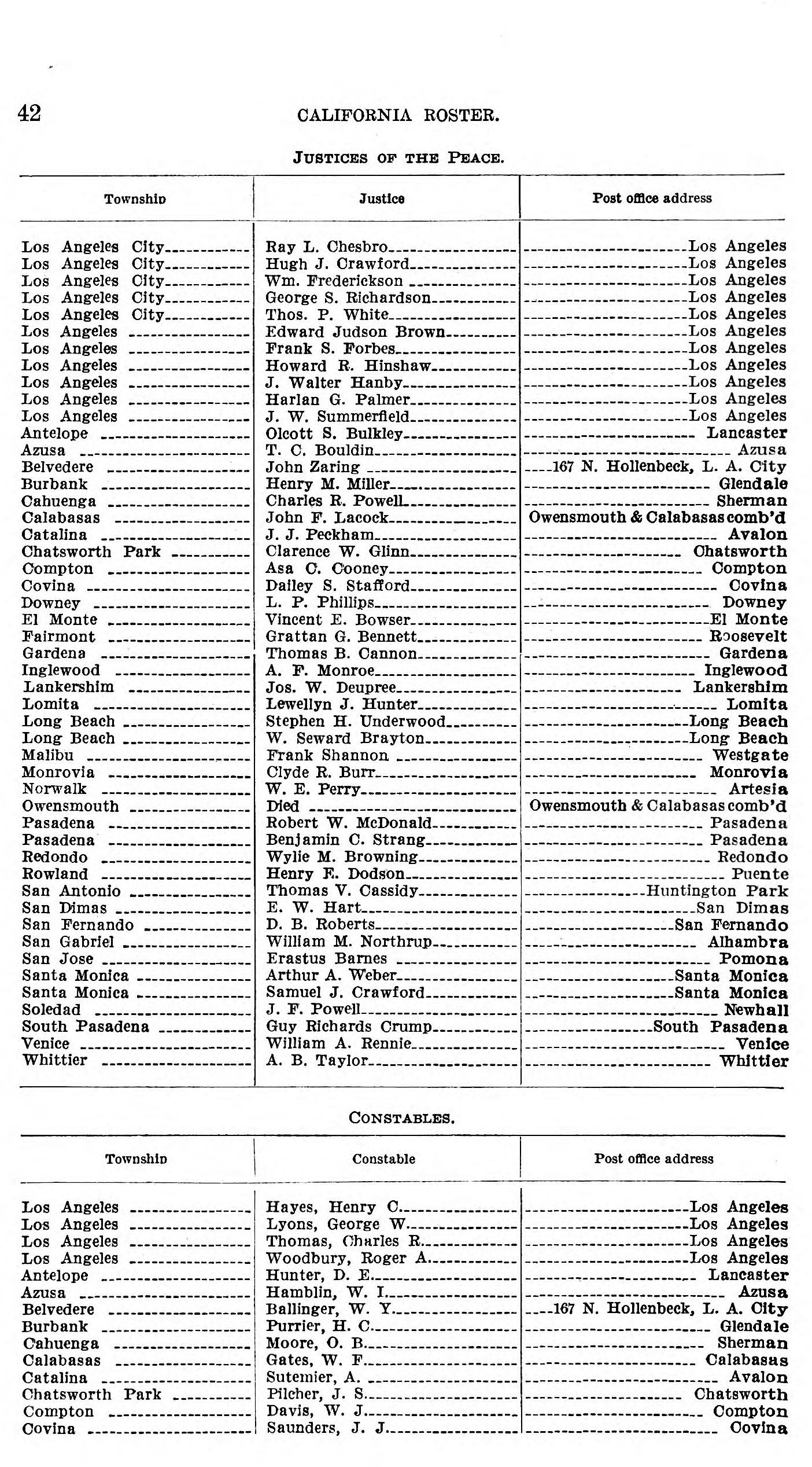
Example of Los Angeles County, California township officers: justices of the peace and constables of the various townships in 1917

The history of Los Angeles County, California includes the history of the Tovaangar; the pueblo, missions and ranchos of the Spanish-Mexican era; the histories of the various incorporated cities and unincorporated areas within the borders; and the story of the government of Los Angeles County.

However, since statehood the boundaries of Los Angeles County have been changed over time and beyond the vast administrative apparatus overseen by the L.A. County Board of Supervisors, the county was subdivided into minor civil divisions called townships. These townships were initially created under the Public Land Survey System but have functioned and been shaped quite differently than the rectangular townships of the Midwest or the township governments of New England.

== Boundaries of Los Angeles County ==
Los Angeles County was one of the original counties established at the time of statehood. The eastern part of the original county was set aside in 1853 as San Bernardino County. In 1866 Kern County was established with land that had previously been assigned to Tulare and Los Angeles Counties. The boundary between Los Angeles and Ventura was resurveyed in 1881 due to unclear or conflicting descriptions in some previous statues and an additional 300 mi2 were affirmed to belong to the jurisdiction of Ventura. Orange County was set apart from Los Angeles County in 1886 with the boundary between the two counties set at Coyote Creek with additional specifics codified in 1919.

== Townships of Los Angeles County ==
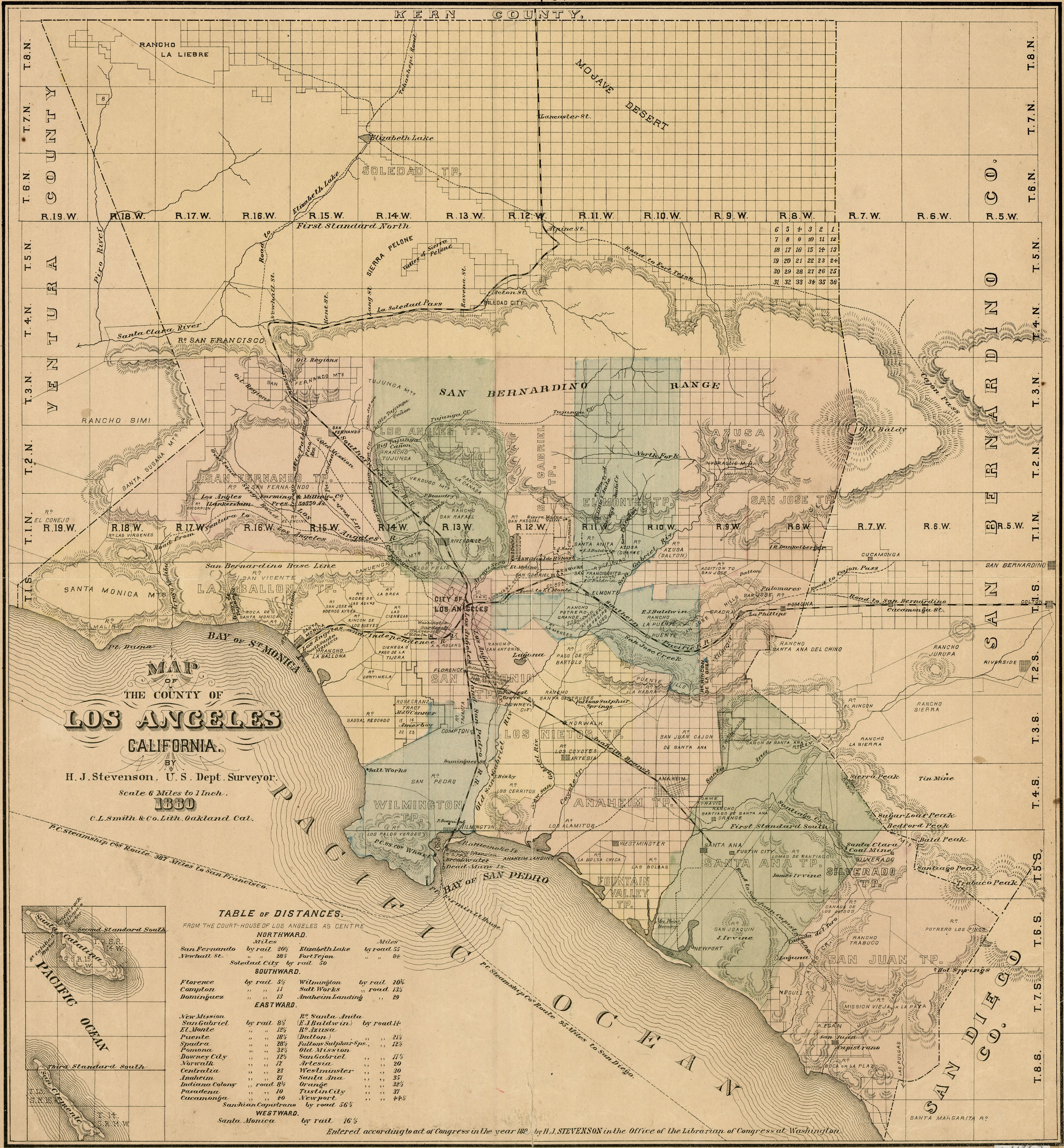
Map of Los Angeles County in 1880, before Orange County was separated, showing San Fernando Township, Los Angeles Township, San Gabriel Township, El Monte Township, Azusa Township, San Jose Township, La Ballona Township, San Antonio Township, Wilmington Township, Los Nietos Township, Anaheim Township, Fountain Valley Township, Santa Ana Township, Silverado Township, and San Juan Township

Townships in California have never developed as real units of local government. Since the California constitution of 1879, they have instead lost all functions other than those of a minor judicial nature. Government functions that elsewhere in the United States might fall to the township in California are the responsibility of various special purpose districts. The main purpose of townships in California since 1879 is the "judicial township" which employs justices of the peace and constables. However townships were also used for organizing election precincts and federal census enumeration.

The names and boundaries of townships in Los Angeles county have ebbed and flowed quite a bit over the decades. Six townships were organized in Los Angeles County in 1850. There were over 40 named townships within Los Angeles County circa 1934.

Township name	1850	1870	1887	1922
Los Angeles Township	X	X	X	X
San Gabriel Township	X		X	X
San Jose Township	X		X	X
San Bernardino Township	X			
Santa Ana Township	X			
San Juan Capistrano Township	X	X		
Wilmington Township		X	X	
San Antonio Township		X		
Los Nietos Township		X	X	
Anaheim Township		X	X	
Santa Ana Township		X		
San Joaquin Township		X		
Soledad Township			X	X
La Ballona Township			X	
San Fernando Township			X	X
El Monte Township			X	X
Azusa Township			X	X
Antelope Township				X
Belvedere Township				X
Cahuenga Township				X
Calabasas Township				X
Catalina Township				X
Chatsworth Park Township				X
Covina Township				X
Downey Township				X
Fairmont Township				X
Inglewood Township				X
Gardena Township				X
Lomita Township				X
Lankershim Township				X
Long Beach Township				X
Malibu Township				X
Monrovia Township				X
Norwalk Township				X
Pasadena Township				X
Redondo Township				X
Rowland Township				X
San Antonia Township				X
San Dimas Township				X
South Pasadena Township				X
Venice Township				X
Whittier Township				X

== See also ==
- Territorial evolution of California
- History of Los Angeles
- Timeline of Los Angeles
- History of Pasadena, California
- History of the San Fernando Valley
- Timeline of Long Beach, California
- History of Santa Monica, California
- History of Santa Catalina Island
- List of counties in California
- Ranchos of Los Angeles County
