= Friends of Ballona Wetlands =

California nonprofit organization

Friends of Ballona Wetlands (FBW) is a California non-profit 501(c)(3) organization founded in 1978 by a small group of friends, scientists and neighbors who recognized the environmental value of Los Angeles County's last remaining tidal ecosystem. The organization is dedicated to preserving and protecting the Ballona Wetlands through stewardship and educating the public. The FBW partners with the California Coastal Conservancy and the California Department of Fish and Wildlife (CDFW). The FBW also partners with faculty and staff from a Catholic college, Loyola Marymount University (LMU), and with Heal The Bay. The FBW was founded in 1978, and legally continued their access in 2003, when the CDFW acquired the private Ballona Wetlands. Public access improved when the Ballona Wetlands became public land.

== History ==
Led by founding President Ruth Lansford, in 1978, Friends of Ballona Wetlands filed a lawsuit against landowner Summa Corporation, heirs to the Howard Hughes estate which owned the 1,067 acres of wetland habitat. Of the historically designated 2,000 acres of wetland habitat, more than 900 acres were destroyed in the 1960s with the construction of Marina del Rey. The Friends' lawsuit halted plans for a massive real estate development. Their decades long battle ultimately saved the Ballona Wetlands from destruction when in 2005 it was declared a California State Ecological Reserve.

== Activities ==
The Friends' activities include providing input at government hearings, commenting on a wetlands restoration project, participating in science and research symposium, supporting the former Native American Indigenous cemetery at Ballona Discovery Park in the Playa Vista mixed-used development below the bluff of LMU, taking legal action protecting the wetlands, and formerly worked in the past with Marina DeBris, now in Australia, who developed an art-inspired educational event about pollution.

The FBW formerly partnered with Otis College of Art and Design, as part of an Integrated Learning project in which students and faculty from many different departments worked with local organizations on various community projects.
