= Ripgut brome =

Ripgut brome or ripgut grass refers to some species of brome grasses:

- Bromus diandrus (great brome)
- Bromus rigidus (stiff brome)

The name refers to the fact that even for brome grasses, these species are heavily sclerotized and can cause harm to livestock that feed on them.
