= Rancho Rincón de la Brea =

Pre-statehood land grant, Los Angeles County

Coordinates: 33.980°N 117.870°W

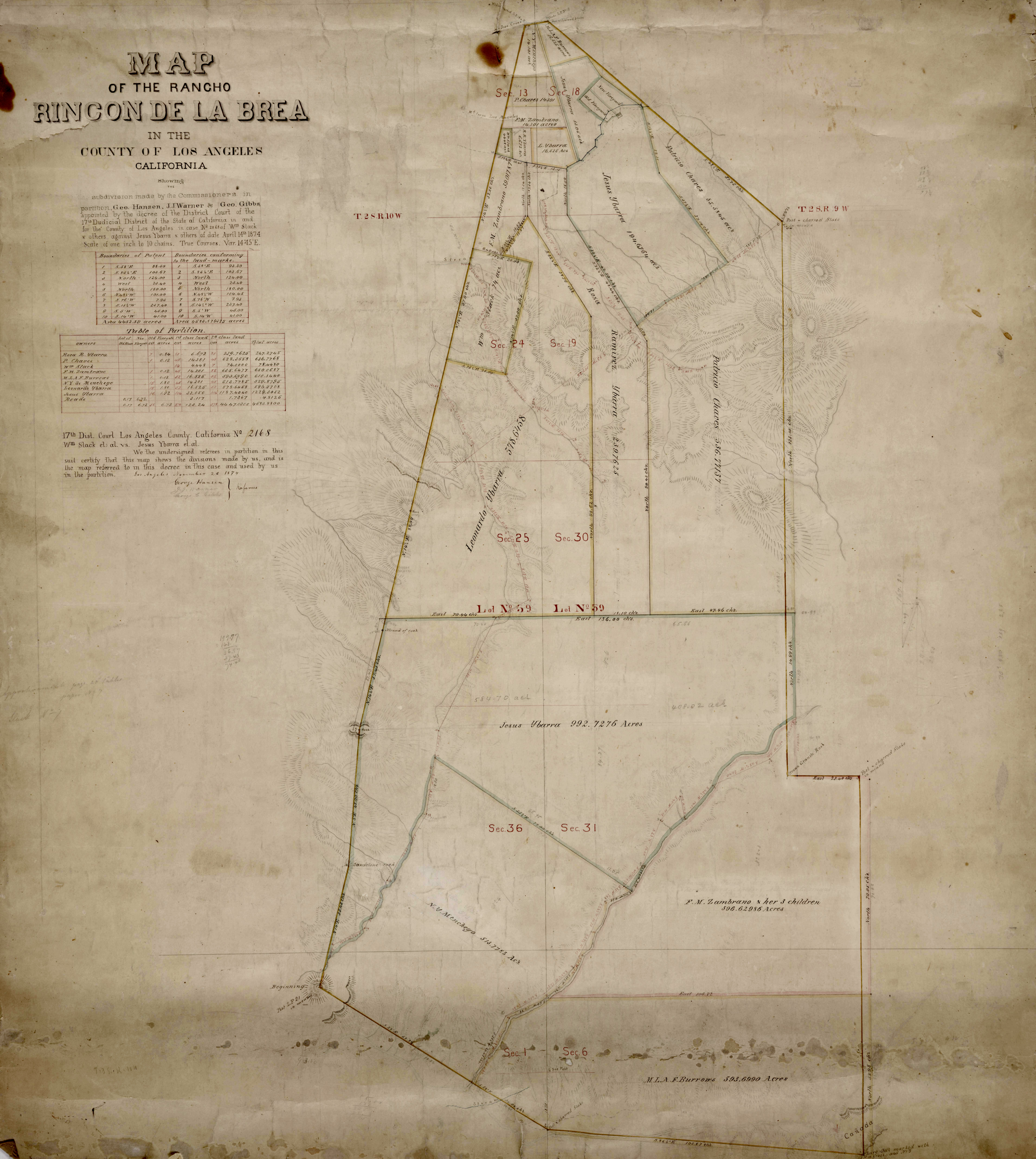
Rancho Rincón de la Brea, as patented in the 1870s

Rancho Rincón de la Brea (also called Rancho Cañada de la Brea) was a 4,452-acre (18.02 km^{2}) Mexican land grant in present day Los Angeles County, California, given in 1841 by Governor Juan Alvarado to Gil Maria Ybarra. The name means "Tar Gully Ranch" in Spanish. The one square league grant extended southward from San Jose Creek into the hills of Brea Canyon. Known as "Rancho la Canada de la Brea" when application for the grant was originally made in 1841, it was subsequently referred to as "Rancho Rincon de la Brea" and "Rancho de los Ybarras". The rancho was situated in present day unincorporated Los Angeles County: east of Rowland Heights, south of La Puente, west of Diamond Bar, and north of Brea.

== History ==
Gil Maria Ybarra (1784, San Diego –1855, Rancho Rincon de la Brea) was appointed síndico of Pueblo de Los Angeles in 1831. As sindico, it was his duty to receive or take charge of property under litigation and liquidated assets of those who were bankrupt. He was alcalde of Los Angeles in 1836-1837. In 1812 Ybarra married María Apolonia Manríquez (1796, San Diego –1856, Walnut California). Ybarra built a home on Spring Street in Los Angeles - Spring Street between Ord Street and the Plaza was called Calle de los Ybarras. He was a prominent partisan of the south against Alvarado's government in 1937–1938.

With the cession of California to the United States following the Mexican-American War, the 1848 Treaty of Guadalupe Hidalgo provided that the land grants would be honored. As required by the Land Act of 1851, a claim for Rancho Rincon de La Brea was filed with the Public Land Commission in 1852, and the grant was patented to Gil Ybarra in 1864.

== Historic sites of the Rancho ==
- Ybarra Adobe. Home of Otterbein Ybarra, said to have been built by Gil Ybarra or a member of his family.

== See also ==
- Ranchos of California
- List of rancho land grants in Los Angeles County, California
