= Ballona Wetlands =

Estuary and marsh in California, United States

Ballona Wetlands Ecological Reserve
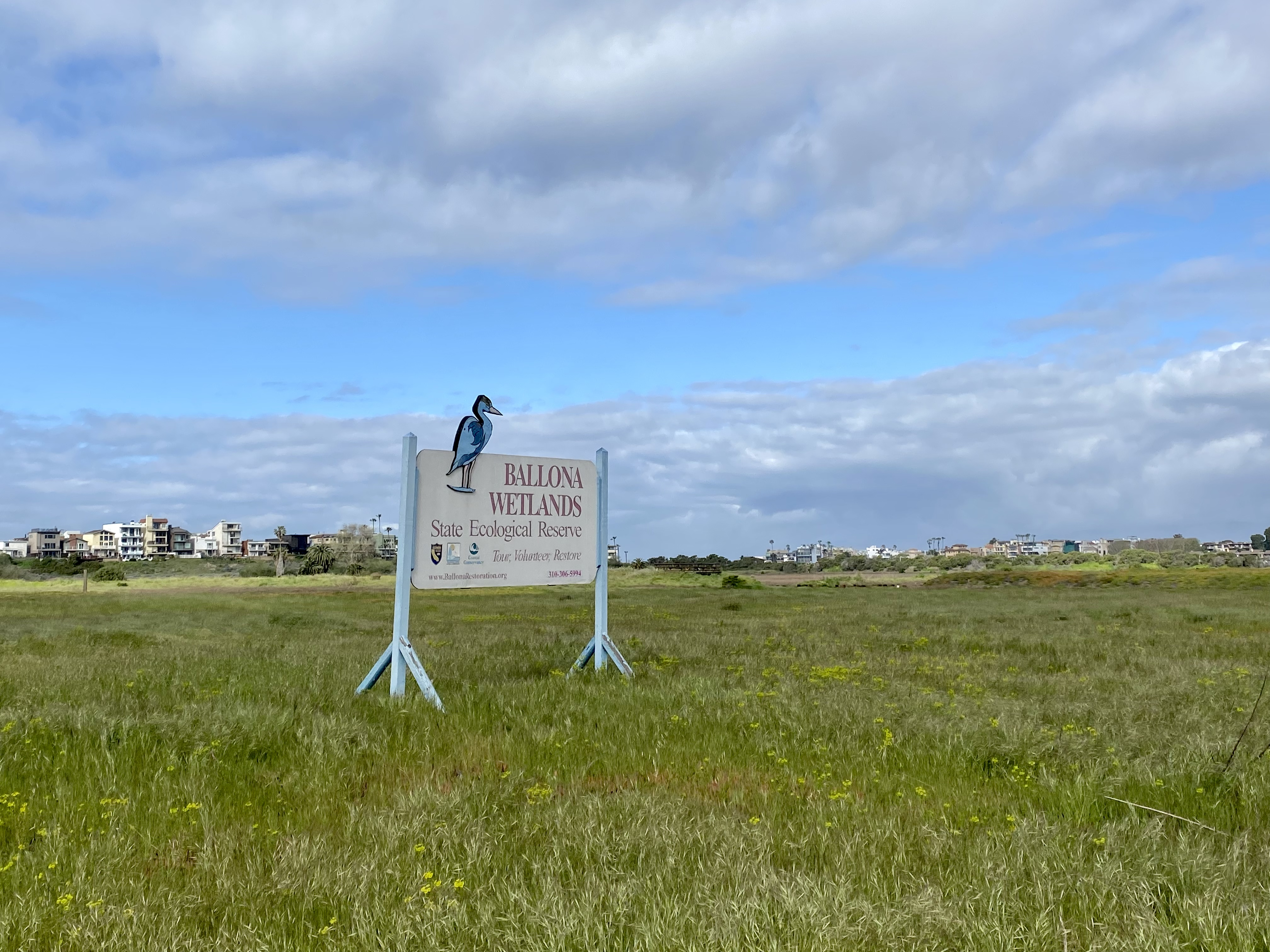
- Interactive map of Ballona Wetlands Ecological Reserve
- Location: Los Angeles County, California, United States
- Coordinates: 33°57′37″N 118°26′54″W
- Area: 577 acres (234 ha)
- Operator: California Department of Fish and Wildlife
- Owner: State of California (CDFW & SLC)

Ballona Wetlands Ecological Reserve (pronunciation: "Bah-yo-nuh" or "Buy-yo-nah") is a protected area that once served as the natural estuary for neighboring Ballona Creek. The 577-acre (2.34 km^{2}) site is located in Los Angeles County, California, just south of Marina del Rey. Ballona—the second-largest open space within the city limits of Los Angeles, behind Griffith Park—is owned by the state of California and managed by the California Department of Fish and Wildlife. The preserve is bisected generally east–west by the Ballona Creek channel and bordered by the 90 Marina freeway to the east.

Ballona Wetlands Ecological Reserve is one of the last significant wetlands or marshes left in Los Angeles County, wetlands being "areas that are periodically, seasonally or perennially flooded that also have specific types of vegetation." Ballona is a "fragile, self-sustaining bog, fed by both fresh and salt water…This and other major wetlands of the Los Angeles Basin, including Bixby Slough…have been largely filled in for urban development." The value of Ballona is that "wetlands teem with life and are among the earth's most productive environments."

== Geography ==
The original extent of Ballona Wetlands likely ranged between 1,500 acres (6.1 km^{2}) and 2,100 acres (8.5 km^{2}). The wetlands can be roughly divided into five ecologically distinct areas: saltwater marsh (wetland fed by the ocean), freshwater marsh (wetland fed by creeks and streams), riparian corridor (creek bottomland), sand dunes and bluffs.

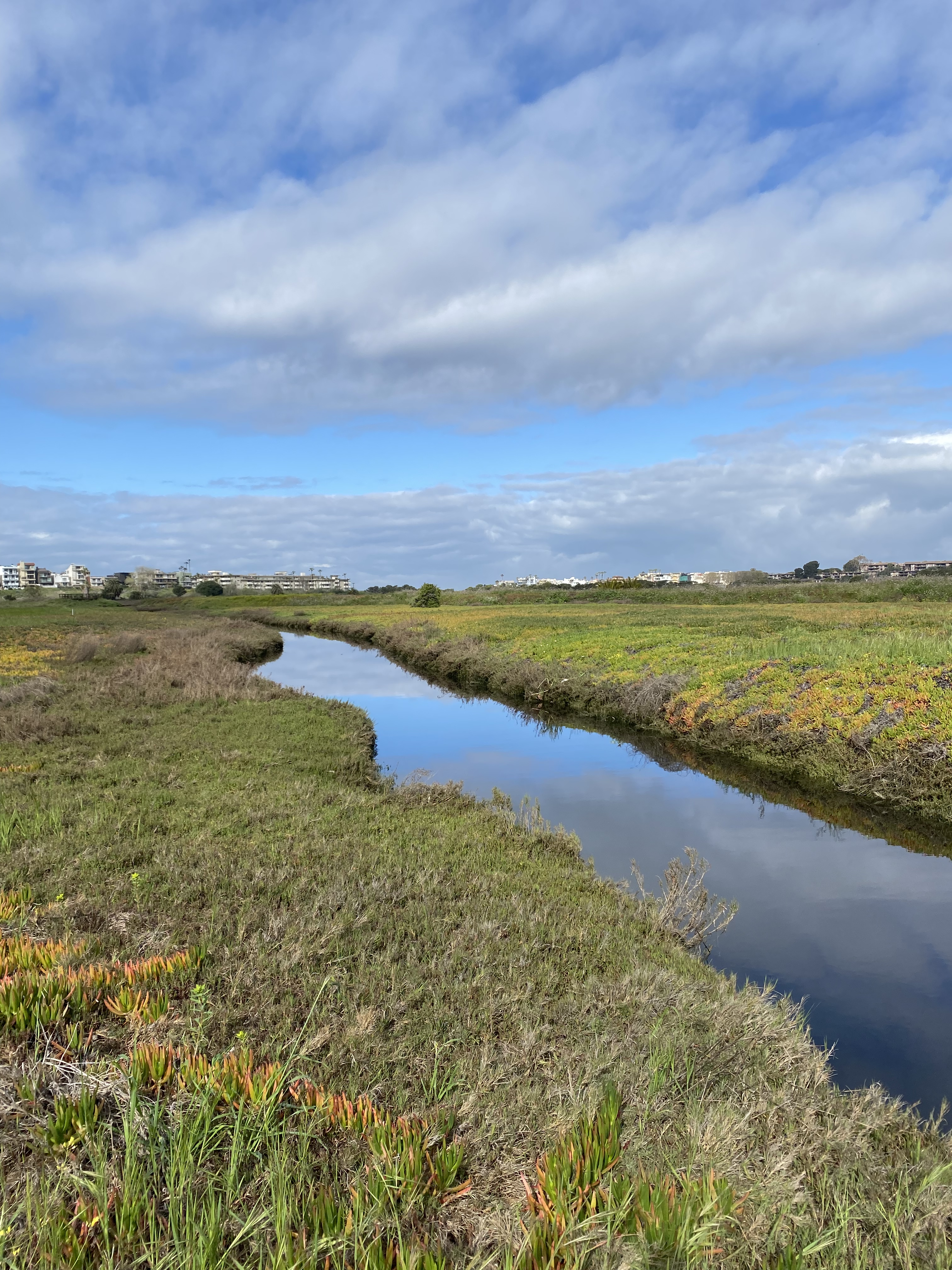
Area B

Habitat types present in the wetlands include coastal prairie, coastal willow woodland, coastal shrubland, salt pannes and pools, vernal pools, and coastal urban forests.

In addition to functioning as a tidal river estuary, Ballona Creek also acts as a flood control channel, and the construction of an estuarine harbor and port called Marina del Rey in the late 1950s, increased the 2,100-acre (8.5 km^{2}) urbanized estuary by 700 acres (2.8 km^{2}).

Additional open space east of the wetlands was converted to agricultural uses by the early 20th century. Many of these farm fields became the private Hughes Airport with other fields staying under cultivation continuing well into the 1990s, when they became some of the last farm fields in the Los Angeles Basin. In the first decade of the 21st century the Hughes Airport land was developed as Playa Vista, a neighborhood east of Lincoln Boulevard.

=== Land rights ===
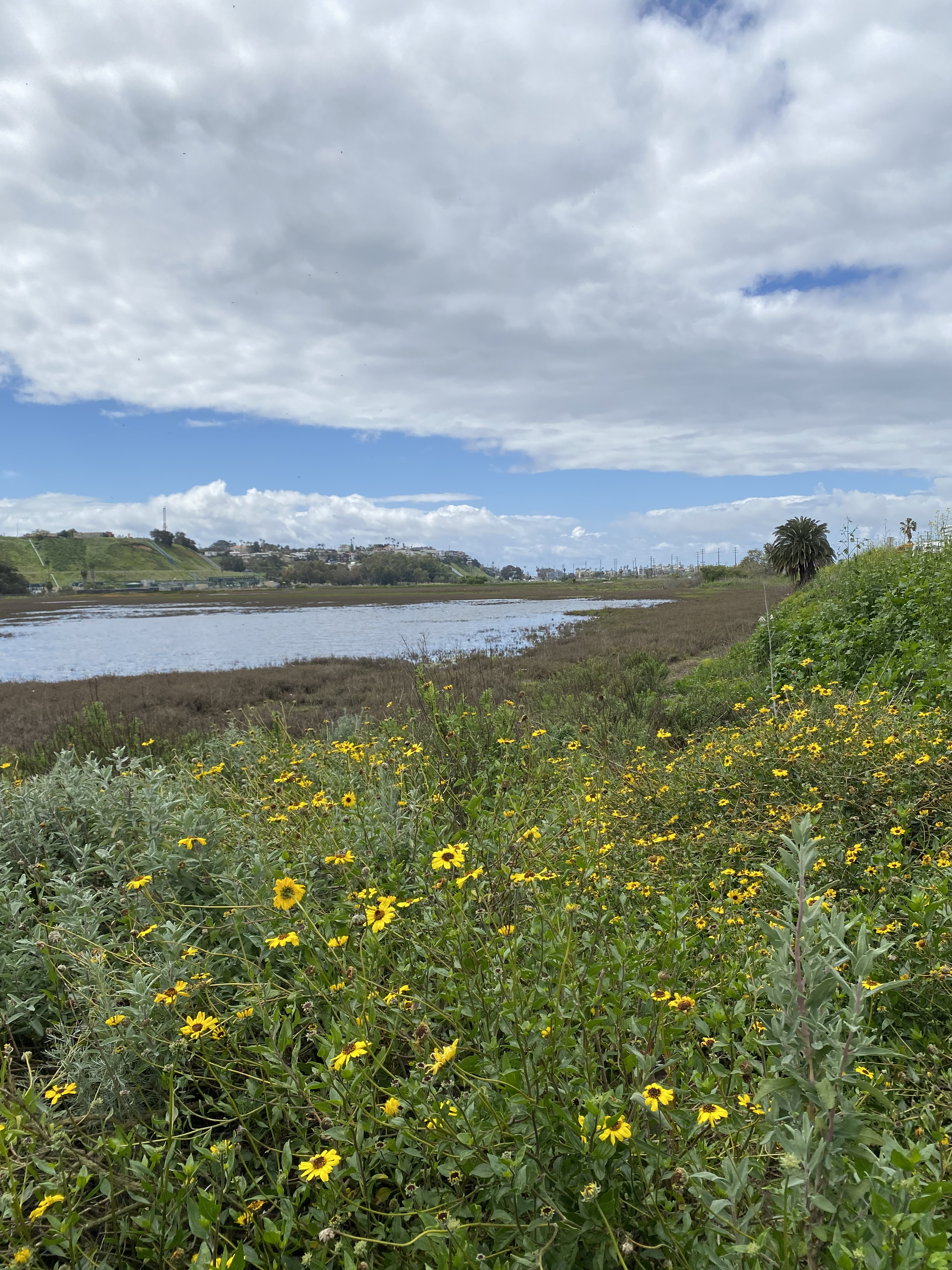
Tongva people called this land Pwinukipar, meaning "it is filled with water"

The remaining open space of what was once the vast Rancho la Ballona has been the subject of a battle between developers and environmentalists that has been ongoing for decades.

Eighty-three acres (340,000 m^{2}) of estuarine wetland were included in the state acquisition, previously privately owned by Howard Hughes, his corporate heirs and the subsequent developers of Playa Vista. Numerous environmental lawsuits and the acquisition of a part of the Wetlands by the State of California has helped to protect nearly all the open space west of Lincoln Blvd. (including all of the remaining tidal wetlands).

Southern California Gas Company has a facility in Area B related to underground natural gas; oil drilling of the land took place in the 20th century and infrastructure from that era remains.

=== Ballona Freshwater Marsh ===
Ballona Freshwater Marsh (BFM) is a 26.1-acre (106,000 m^{2}) marsh fed by water from the nearby Bluff Creek, a remnant of Centinela Creek. The freshwater marsh, located on the corner of Lincoln and Jefferson, was built in 2003 by the corporation that was building the adjacent Playa Vista neighborhood.

The land had previously been a derelict celery field that supported approximately 50 bird species. The creation of the Freshwater Marsh has been described as "wildly successful, providing rich native habitat and regulated access for people, where degraded land once dominated." Some 250 species of birds have now been recorded at the Freshwater Marsh.

=== Subdivisions ===
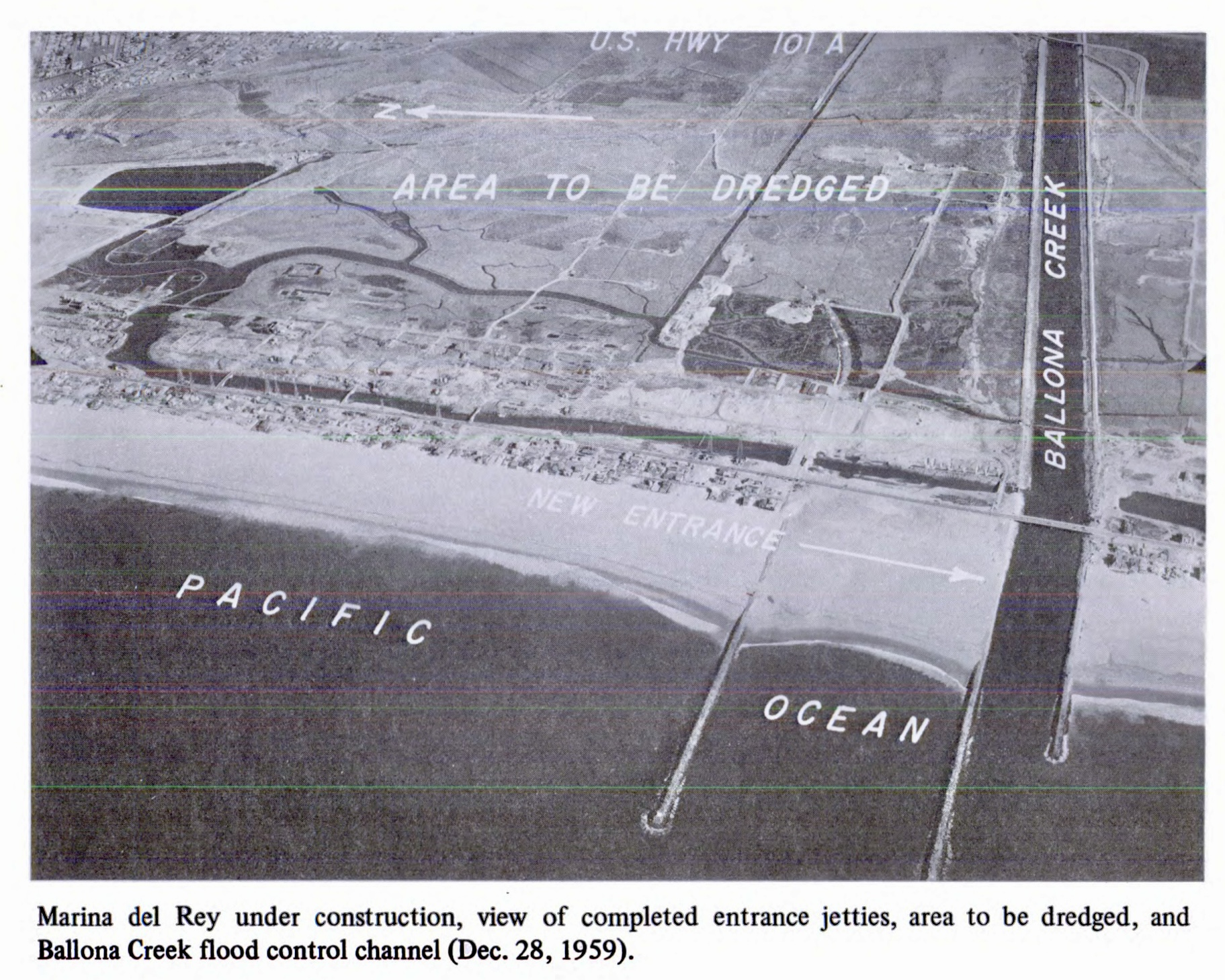
Ballona Wetlands in 1959 before creation of Marina del Rey small boat harbor, facing the Venice Grand Canal and Ballona Lagoon (U.S. Army Corps of Engineers)

The Ballona Wetlands are typically divided into four sections for planning and study purposes.

- Area A: West of Lincoln Boulevard, north of the creek
- Area B: West of Lincoln, south of the creek
- Area C: East of Lincoln, north of the creek, west of Marina Freeway
- Area D: Playa Vista neighborhood including Bluff Creek riparian corridor

== Ecology and biodiversity ==
"These marshes are more than for just the birds. They're also fish nurseries, water and air filtration systems, places for groundwater to refill aquifers, and buffer zones that help protect human homes and other property from floods."

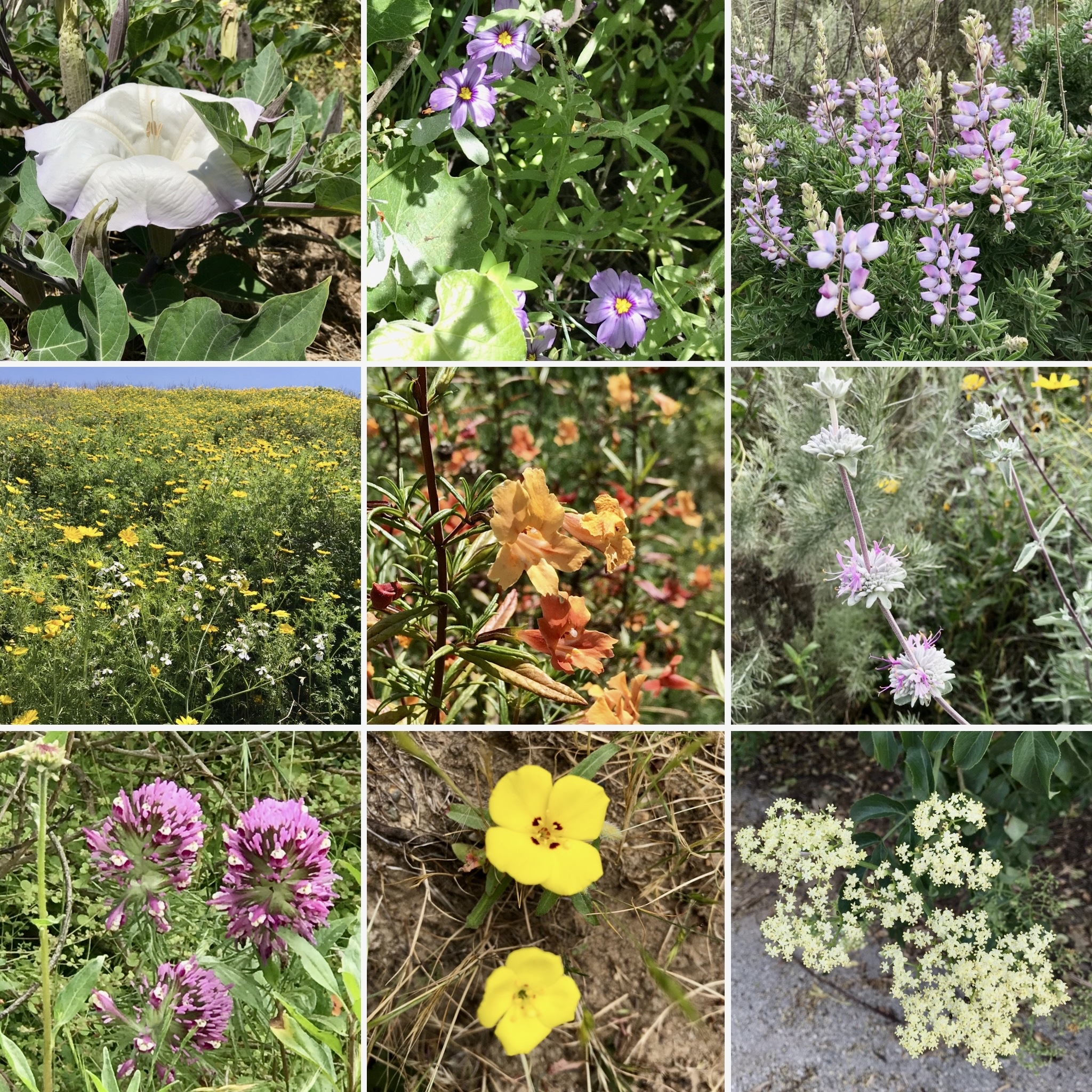
Spring blossoms of Ballona Wetlands Ecological Reserve

Wetland flora includes pickleweed, alkali heath, saltgrass, salt marsh dodder, arrowgrass, glasswort, and upland species like coyote bush and goldenbush.

Common introduced species in the wetlands are crown daisy, Canary Island palm, ice plant, pampas grass, castor bean, ripgut brome, myoporum, wild mustard and wild radish.

Eight acres (32,000 m^{2}) of sand dune habitat has been restored by Friends of Ballona Wetlands volunteers.

Orcutt's yellow pincushion (Chaenactis glabriuscula var. orcuttiana) is a rare native plant endemic to the coastal dunes of southern California that was newly discovered at Ballona in 2010.

=== Wildlife ===
Ballona is recognized as an Important Birding Area by the Audubon Society and nearly 260 bird species across almost 50 taxonomical families have been observed visiting Ballona freshwater marsh alone. The total bird count for the immediate area hits 320 species when the survey area includes the wetlands, the nearby bluffs, parks and residential neighborhoods.

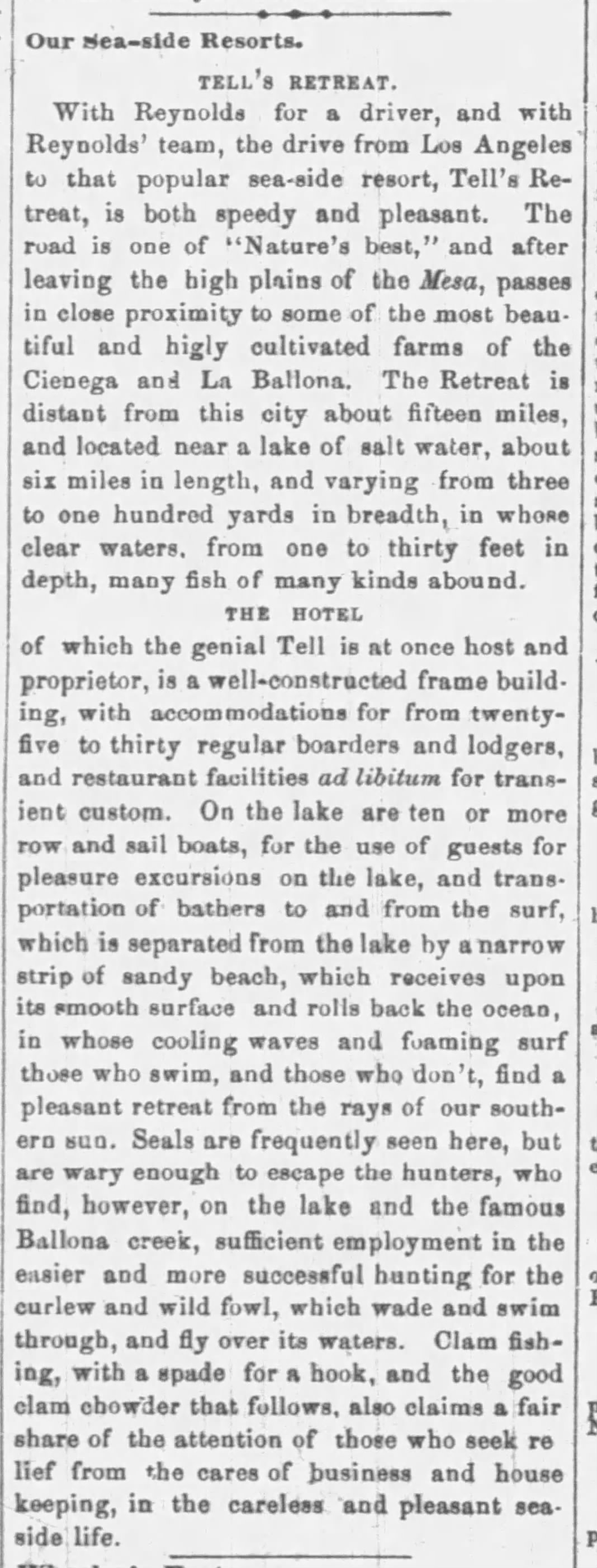
A newspaper mentioned seals, curlew and clams as 19th-century attractions of the once much-larger Ballona lagoon ("Our Sea-Side Resorts: Tell's Retreat" Los Angeles Daily Star, August 23, 1871)

The Ballona Wetlands and the adjacent city-owned lagoons are a stop along the migratory Pacific Flyway. Migratory birds "rest and feed in wetlands, the only environment in which most species can find adequate food…Salt-water flooding offers birds a rich source of food, inviting both shore and land-dwelling migratory birds." Some 90 percent of wetlands in Los Angeles County have been destroyed, and "the missing wetlands are missing steppingstones in the Pacific Flyway—one of the largest north-south migrations of waterfowl in the world."

Birders visiting the marsh "often spot red-throated loons, herons, tree swallows, barn swallows, hummingbirds and red-tailed hawks who like to surf the air." The green heron, great blue heron and snowy egret are also frequent sights at Ballona (with urban woodland trees alongside roadsides and buildings serving as rookeries). The shorebirds visit to feed on "clams, snails, crabs, worms, and shrimp."

Birds generally uncommon to the area may appear in the Ballona watershed: "Here you'll see many surfbirds. Look for wandering tattlers, black oystercatchers, pelicans, scoters, loons and grebes. You may see the harlequin duck, Eastern kingbird and gray vireo, and there are many warblers, including the prairie warbler. Golden plovers, white-tailed kites and short-eared owls inhabit the mud flats." Rarities (such as the bald eagle that visited the winter of 1977–78) aside, the majority of the bird population at water's edge are "the more common plovers, willets, sanderlings, curlews and killdeer."

The myriad of shorebirds that dot our sand spits and mud flats, and even inland marshes, go for the most part undisturbed. He who would find himself the shorebirds should hie himself to the mud flats and boggy marsh lands lying a few miles out of Los Angeles…Before Playa Del Rey was thrust on an unwilling market, when it was plain old Ballona, and the sea was not assisted to flow over the mud-covered flats, the plover there were simply uncountable at low tide. It is the best beach—except Newport—to hunt them now but what it was and what it is are vastly different.

— "SHOOTING THE SHORE BIRDS: Best of Sport, Second Only to Duck Hunting. Now is the Time to Bag the Longlegged Waders. Many Varieties of Plover and Snipe to be Found on Our Marshes" (Los Angeles Times, 1903)

Bird species of special interest observed in the reserve include nesting pairs of Belding's Savannah sparrow and foraging California least terns.

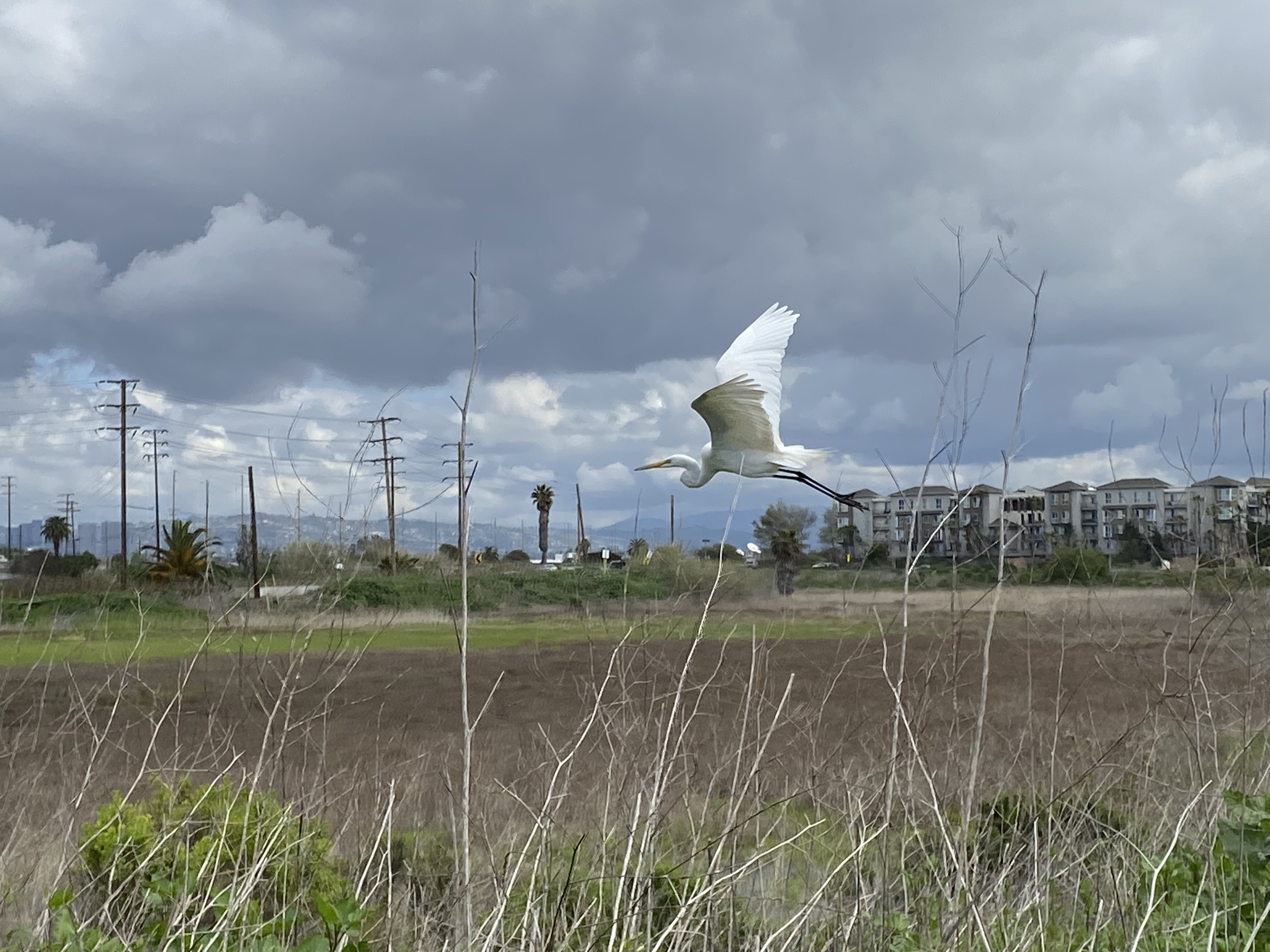
Great egret takes off toward the creek

The wetlands and surrounding waterways support a dozen species of dragonfly and a half-dozen additional damselflies. Five species of bumblebee, including Crotch's bumblebee (identified as a "species of greatest conservation need" by California Department of Fish and Wildlife), have been documented at the Wetlands. There are several reptile species present, including the San Diego legless lizard and a geographically isolated population of Southern Pacific rattlesnakes. A population of introduced red foxes was relocated in the 1990s; coyotes now regularly make themselves known in the wetlands, along the creek and in surrounding neighborhoods.

== History ==
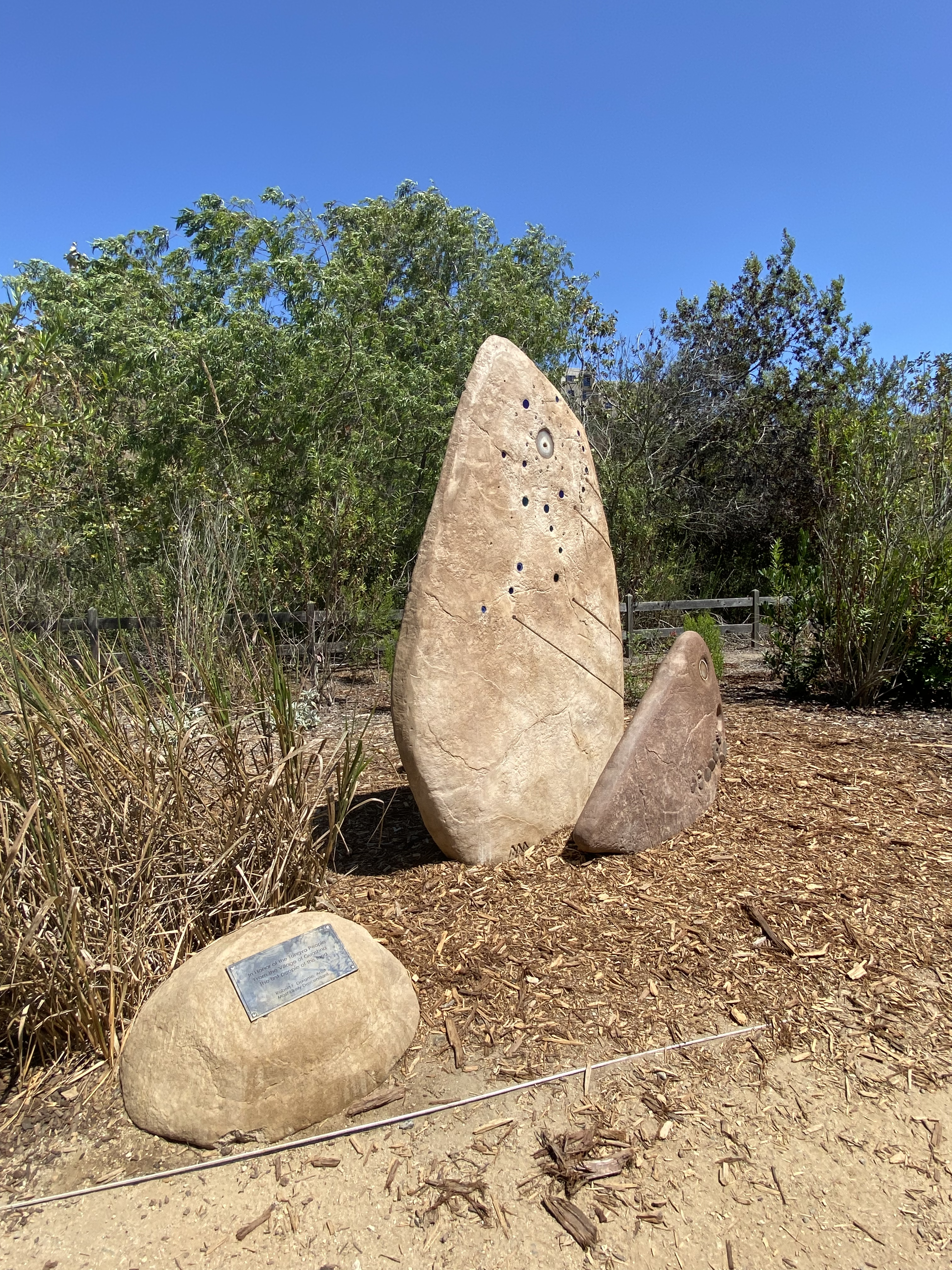
Monument to Guashna village

Tongva artifacts and ancient human remains were found during excavation of the Playa Vista site. "To the 2,000 or so remaining Gabrieleños…the Ballona Wetlands are sacred. They made their homes near the wetlands. They ate the fish hatched in its estuaries and hunted the wild rabbits. They used the rare pickleweed and other plants to make medicine. They buried their dead there."

Augustin Machado began to graze cattle on his land known as Rancho La Ballona in the 1820s. The origin of the placename Ballona is disputed and remains poorly understood.

During the expansion of Playa Del Rey in 1911, a California paper retold this history:

"The ocean frontage of La Ballona Rancho was known in early days as Ballona Slough. It consisted of marshy fields broken by sand dunes and lagoons of salt water, which were considered worthless as home for [anything but] duck and other game birds. In 1870 a native of Switzerland with the historic name of William Tell built a shack on the site of the present Del Rey Hotel, and named it Tell's Lookout. He furnished boats, guns and fishing tackle for his patrons. In 1877 Michael Duffy opened what he called Hunter's Cottage in Tell's old location. He furnished board as well as hunting outfits."

An "old-timer", who told stories about the area between 1876 and 1890, recalled, "There were but a few trees in the valley at that time and standing on the hills back of the depot, one could see the breakers rolling over the sand dunes at Playa Del Rey, about four miles south of Palms, which at that time was called William Tell's Lake."

A history of Santa Monica recalled "Duck shooting on Ballona laguna and boating on the laguna were popular pastimes. The boats on the laguna known as the Pollywog and the Mud Hen. Spanish games took place in the spring, when a channel was cut from the laguna to allow the overflow water to escape into the ocean, at the point now known as Playa del Rey."

The wetlands as they stood in 1887 were of interest because of the nascent plans for Port Ballona:

"Four miles southwest of Santa Monica, and ten miles southeast of Los Angeles, lying in the shelter of a low range of hills rising from the valley toward the sea, is a small narrow lake at the point where La Ballona creek debonches into the ocean. It is a true lake, for, although it lies close down upon the sand of the beach, a well-defined earth formation encloses it, and proves conclusively that it's water is not drawn by seepage from the sea. As has been said, the lake is exceedingly narrow. Its length along the shore is about two miles, and it varies in width from two hundred to six hundred feet. The water in it varies in depth, in ordinary times, from six inches to twenty feet.

Back of the lake there is a drift of sand-hills so common along the seacoast of Southern California, and behind these hills there stretch away for miles the low marsh lands of the Centinela ranch. La Ballona creek comes down through this marsh—which is, after all, only a wash of sediment from the hills and higher plains toward Los Angeles—and in the rainy season, the creek breaks through the sand-hills, and the waters overflow the lake and find an outlet to the ocean."

Also in 1887, "the great marsh of Ballona" was viewed as a resource for "persons living at Santa Monica."

"The delicate seaweeds that come ashore are collected and pressed in designs, and vast quantities are sold to tourists and visitors. The various birds that stop here on the way north, especially the egrets, herons and ibises, are mounted as screens and fans, and many are shipped East for the trade there…the great marsh abounds in a remarkable variety of game, including some of the finest wild ducks. A good horse, that will allow shooting from the saddle, is a desideratum, as certain parts of the swamp are fordable, while others are extremely dangerous."

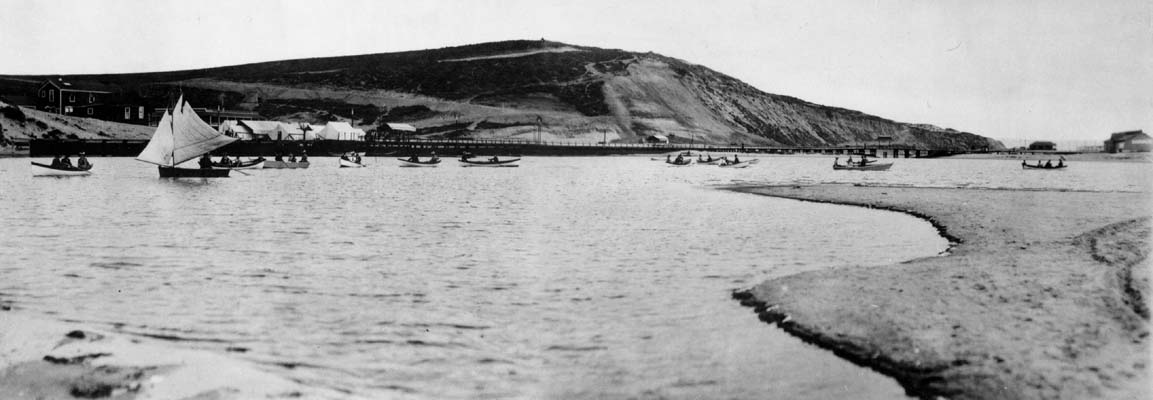
Ballona estuary in 1902, just prior to the development of Playa Del Rey

There were multiple recreational hunting operations on the site through at least 1910. Duck hunters were particularly keen on the marsh's green-winged teals. As of 1921, Ballona Creek "came to a dead end about a mile from the ocean" (the wetlands absorbed much of the water flow and access to the open ocean was presumably blocked by sand dunes).

In 1940, Howard Hughes bought the land below the Westchester bluffs for his airport. In January 1976, four months prior to the death of Howard Hughes, which would kick off the current era of Ballona's long history, the wetland was described by a resident of Playa Del Rey.

"The land, now owned by Howard Hughes' Summa corporation, is posted with 'No trespassing' signs. But field mice roam at will, as do jackrabbits, dogs, cats, horseback riders, bird watchers, geography-ornithology-botany classes, neighborhood children and all sorts of winged creatures."

She observed seven great blue herons foraging for food in the marsh at dusk, and wrote:

"No matter that this same scene had been repeated over a span of many winters—I would always be amazed and delighted that birds could find a patch of wilderness amid the concrete and stucco sprawl of Los Angeles. It is our dumb luck that, what nature has wrought, man cannot so easily tear asunder."

Circa 1979: "The salt marshes on Howard Hughes Summa Corp. lands are the object of a bitter tug-of-war between developers and environmentalists. There, schoolgirls canter horses from a nearby stable in the late afternoons, and children and youngsters go with their classes to learn about ecology."

In 1995, as the development process for Playa Vista was underway, the L.A. Times' nutshell history of Ballona's 20th century was this: "The Ballona Wetlands, near Marina Del Rey, are about all that remains of 1800 acres of marsh that once stretched from Venice south to the bluffs of Playa Del Rey, providing natural flood control and sustaining hundreds of plant and animal species. Construction of Ballona Creek in the 1930s began the process of wetland degradation; construction of the Marina in the 1960s just about completed it."

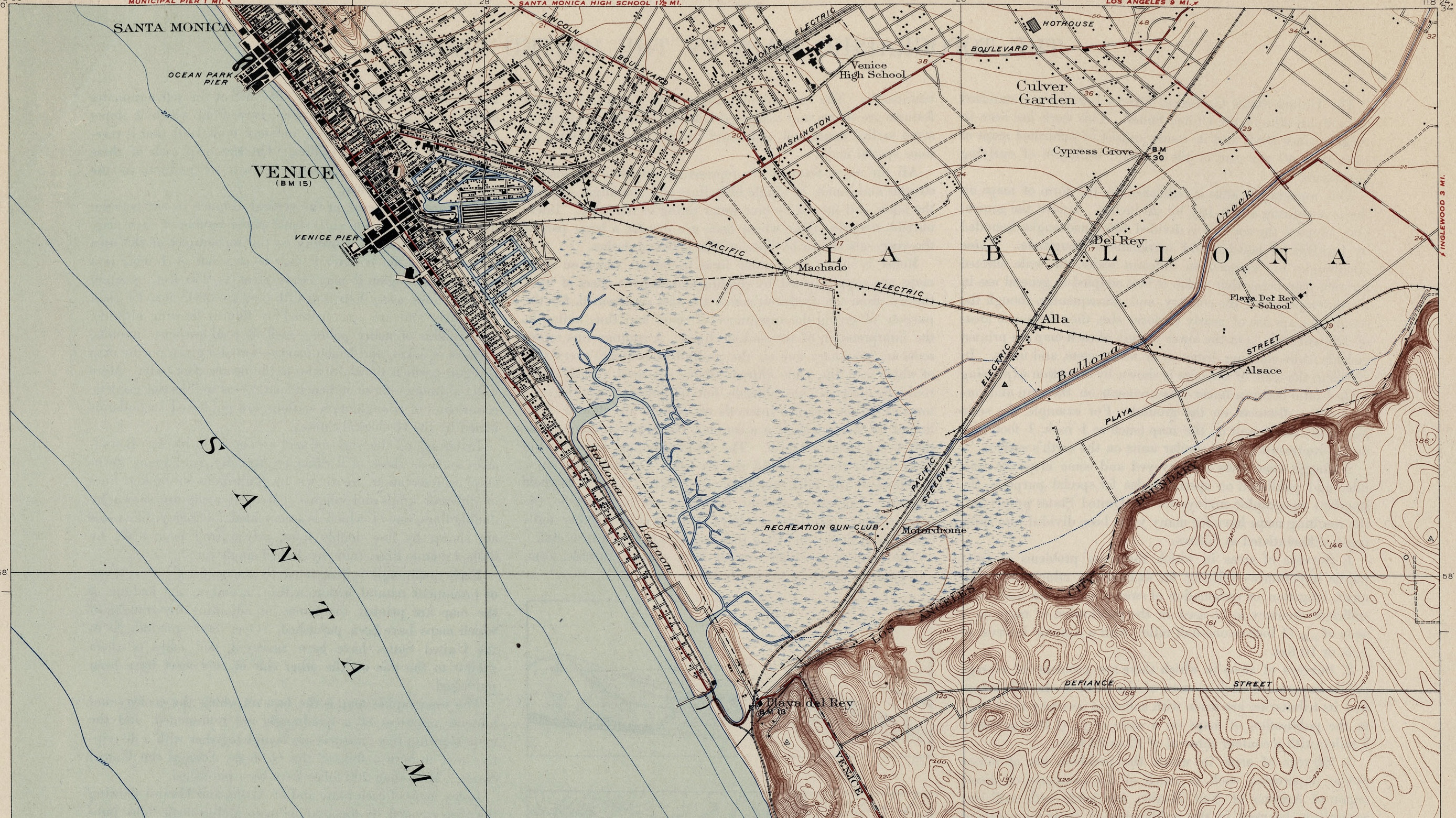
Ballona marshlands, lagoons and channels depicted in 1923 USGS topographical map of "Venice Quadrangle"

== Restoration ==
An extensive planning and public process for the restoration of the Ballona Reserve began in 2004. In December 2020, California Department of Fish and Wildlife certified the final environmental impact report for the Ballona Wetlands Restoration Project and selected a preferred alternative. On May 17, 2023, Los Angeles Superior Court Judge James Chalfant ordered the final environmental impact report to be decertified. CDFW decertified the EIR on September 28, 2023. On previous (archived) versions of its project web page, CDFW initially set target dates of Spring 2024 and later Spring 2025 for having "a draft revised EIR available for public comment" but, having missed those targets, the current page no longer includes any timeline for publication of a Draft Revised EIR.

According to a state of California summary, "The project's restoration components include a net increase of approximately 200 acres (0.81 km^{2}) of coastal wetlands, replacing approximately 9,800 feet (3,000 m) of existing Ballona Creek levees with transitional zones to accommodate for sea-level rise, realigning the existing Ballona Creek channel with a more natural meander shape through the project reach/re-established floodplain, and improving tidal circulation into the ecological reserve."

Site improvements included in the proposed restoration plan include two new bridges (one spanning Lincoln and one crossing Ballona Creek just west of Culver), a scenic-overlook deck, 3.6 miles (5.8 km) of bike-walk trails, 5.5 miles (8.9 km) miles of pedestrian-only access, 2,000 feet (610 m) of boardwalk, educational signage and additional parking.

Under the approved plan, SoCalGas will cap 16 oil wells and remove "accompanying service roads, concrete and infrastructure"; six monitoring wells will be installed to meet regulatory requirements.

Conflict persists about Ballona restoration projects. UCLA sustainability professor Jon Christensen commented about the disagreement in 2020:

"Ballona is kind of a perfect microcosm of debates about nature on a planetary scale—two opposite ways of thinking about the human relationship with nature: one is that we've meddled enough, and we should leave it well enough alone, and the other viewpoint is that we are the dominant force on Earth, and we should use our knowledge and our skills and methods to restore nature."

Stakeholders in favor of the plan include California Department of Fish and Wildlife, the Friends of the Ballona Wetlands, Heal the Bay, the Bay Foundation, SoCal Gas and SoCal Edison. Groups opposed include the Los Angeles Audubon Society, Grassroots Coalition, and Ballona Wetlands Land Trust.

== Access ==
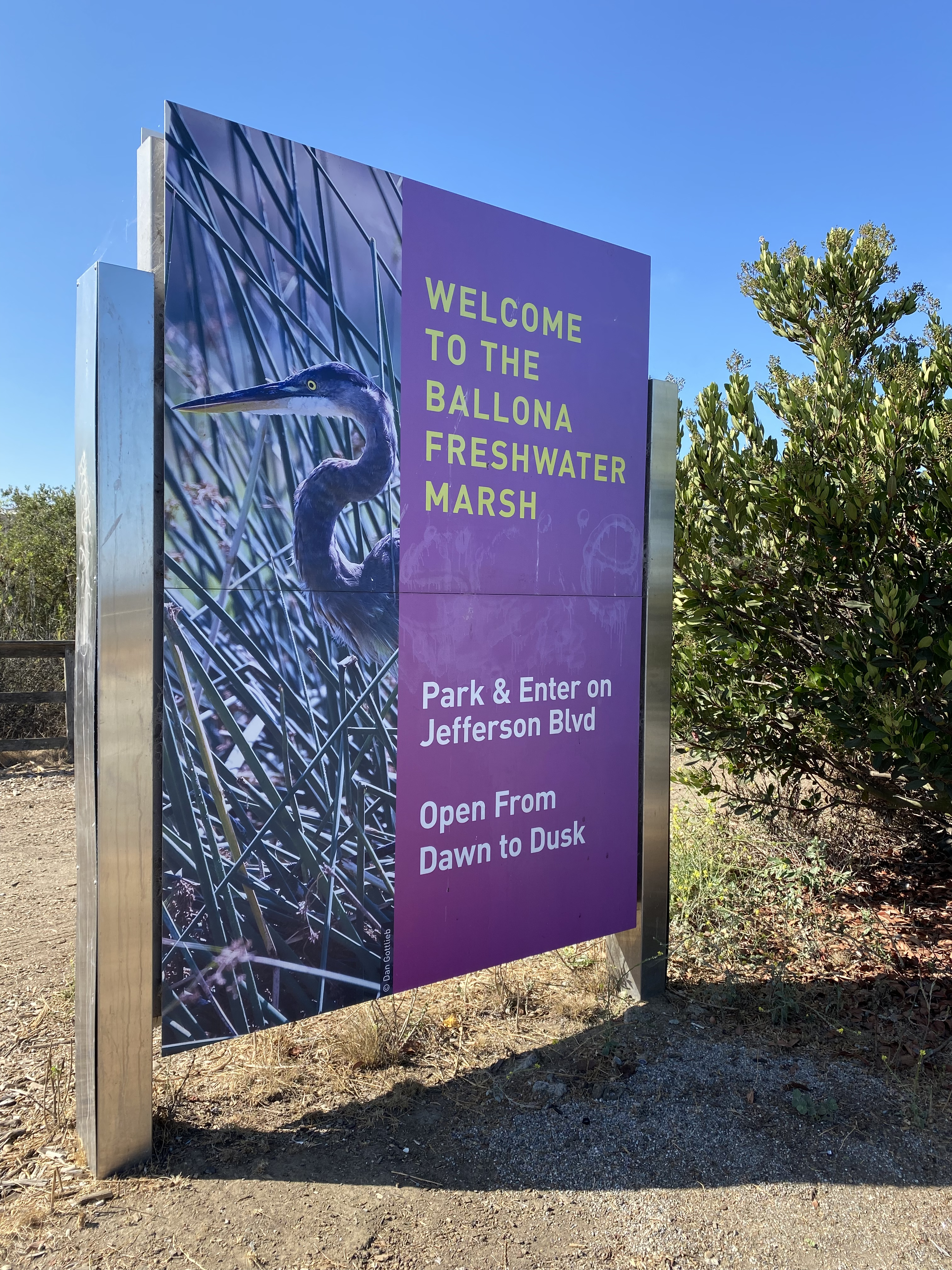
Ballona Freshwater Marsh great blue heron sign

One guide to day trips in the South Bay area of Los Angeles reported, "The beauty of this hike is understated. Two major roadways run beside the property, and CA 90 also drones and howls to the west…However, this should not deter anyone from visiting the wetlands. The idea is to think of what once was and what could be."

Another writer visiting the freshwater marsh observed, "Though the sound of traffic is consistent, just feet away is another world filled with plants, wildlife and the song of birds."

Portions of the Ballona Wetlands Ecological Reserve can be viewed from the Ballona Creek Bike Path.

Ballona Freshwater Marsh

Ballona Freshwater Marsh can be viewed during daylight hours from a .75-mile (1.21 km) (one-way) walking path along Jefferson and Lincoln Boulevards. Parking is available along Jefferson but those spots are often occupied by boondocking RVs. Additional parking is often available near Ballona Discovery Park in Playa Vista. Big Blue Bus line 3 and Metro bus line 115 serve this location.

Ballona Saltwater Marsh

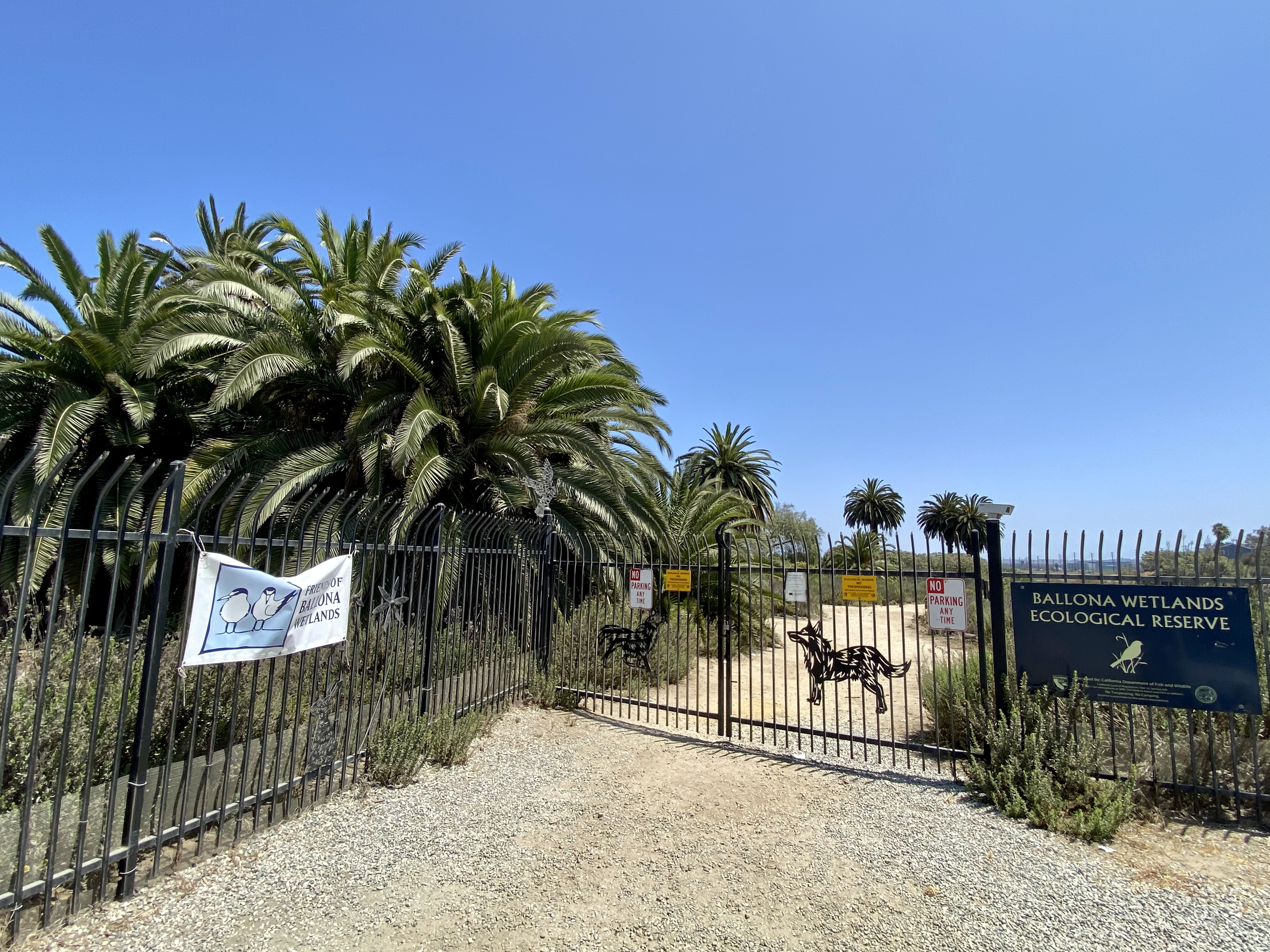
Saltwater Marsh gate in Playa Del Rey

Ballona Saltwater Marsh is closed to the public, however Friends of Ballona Wetlands offers regular guided tours and the Audubon Society hosts monthly bird walks. The saltwater marsh tours are accessible from an entrance in Playa Del Rey.

Tours of this area usually stop at an observation deck built on the old Pacific Electric Red Car berm.

Metro bus route 115 serves this area, and a limited amount of parking is available behind Gordon's Market.

Area A

Area A is accessible from Fiji Way, opposite Fisherman's Village in Marina Del Rey, or from an entrance along the Ballona Creek Bike Path. Area A is open 8 a.m. to 1 p.m., Wednesdays through Saturdays. Culver CityBus route 7 serves this location. Parking for private automobiles is available in a dedicated lot. Bike racks are available along the bike path.

Ballona Discovery Park

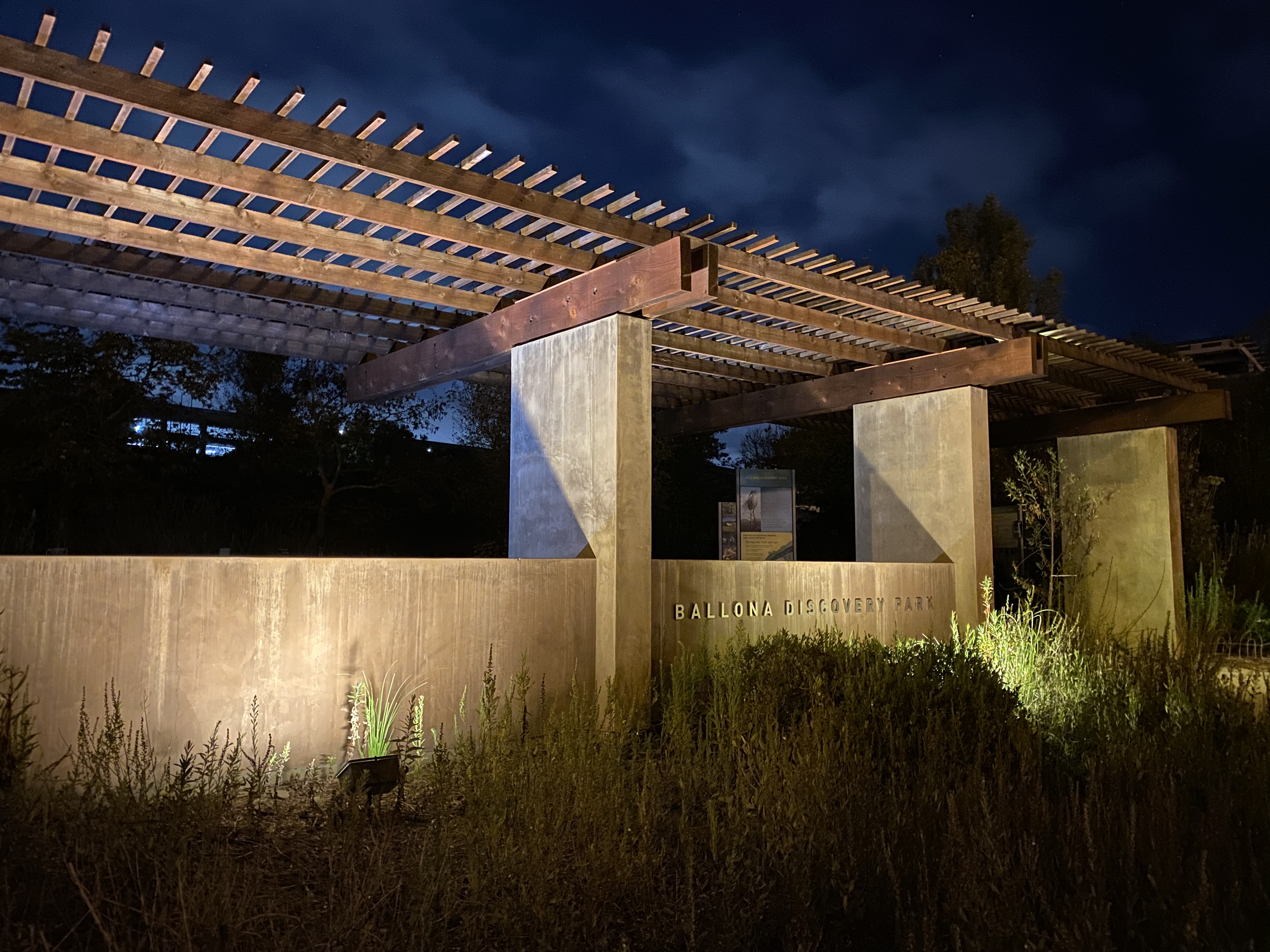
Ballona Discovery Park

Ballona Discovery Park (1.7 acres) is outside the boundary of the state-owned preserve but is located across the street, next to Bluff Creek, within the adjacent Playa Vista development. Conceived as an open-air museum, the site opened to the public in 2011. Native plantings and bird feeders attract wildlife. A model kiiy and informational signs educate visitors and school groups about the Tongva native people. The street address is 13110 Bluff Creek Drive, Playa Vista 90094.

== See also ==
- Redondo Beach via Playa del Rey Line, former Pacific Electric route through the Wetlands
- Venice–Inglewood Line, former Pacific Electric route through the Wetlands
- Friends of Ballona Wetlands, advocacy group

=== Other SoCal wetlands ===
- Madrona Marsh
- Gardena Willows Wetland Preserve
- Bixby Marshland
- Los Cerritos Wetlands
- Bolsa Chica State Ecological Reserve
- Tijuana Slough National Wildlife Refuge

=== Nearby ecologically-related sites and neighborhoods ===
- Del Rey Lagoon and Ballona Lagoon
- Dockweiler Beach
- Oxford Lagoon
- Venice Canals
