= Ballona =

Placename in Southern California

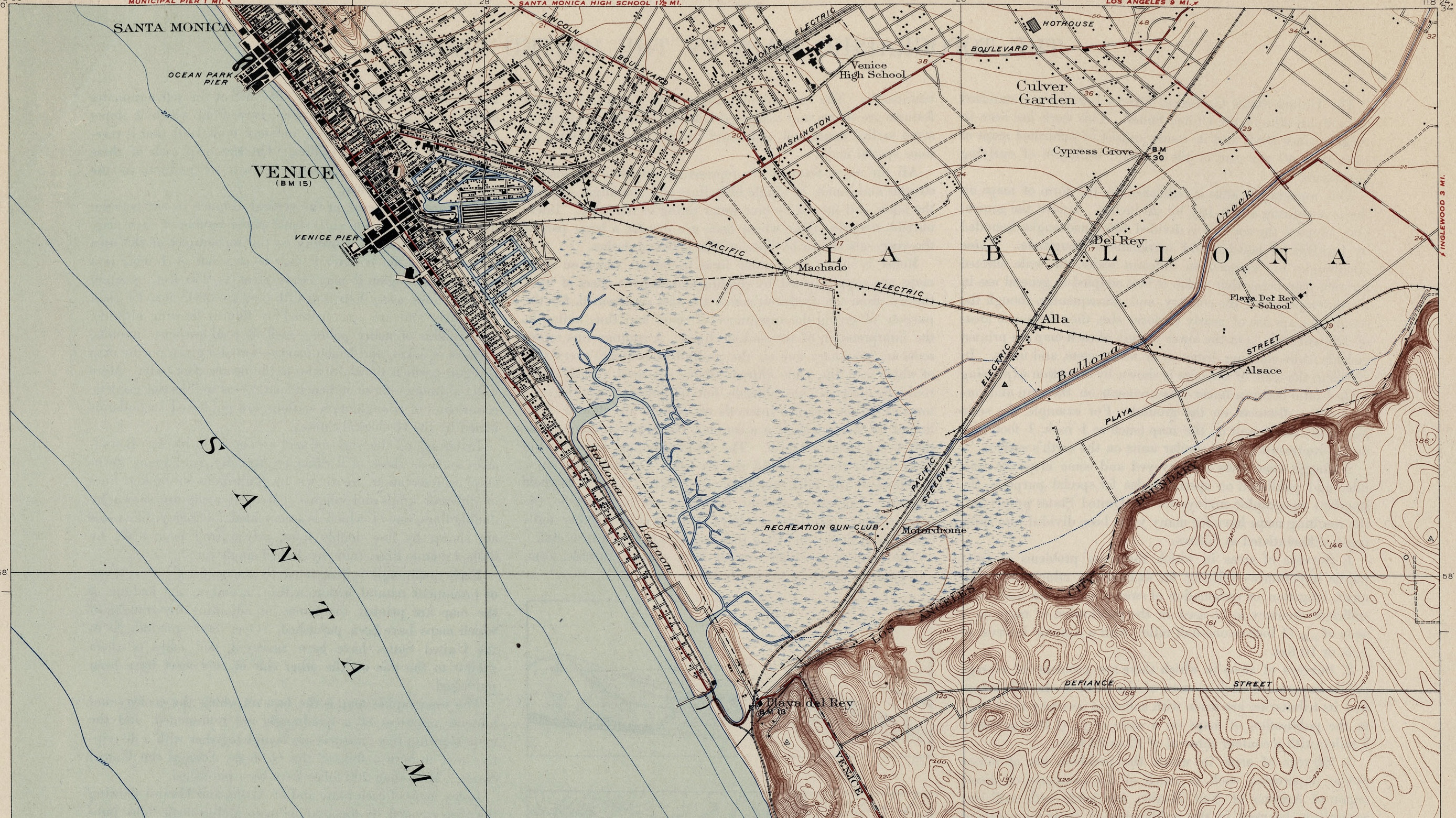
Ballona estuary, 1923

Ballona is a geographic place name in the Westside region of Los Angeles County, California.

Geographic place names:

- Ballona Creek
  - Ballona Creek Bike Path
- Ballona Wetlands
- Ballona Lagoon

Historic places:

- Rancho La Ballona
- Ballona Road (now Washington Blvd.)
- La Ballona Township
- La Ballona station (1870s to 1890s)
- Port Ballona

School:

- La Ballona Elementary School, Culver City

== Place name origin ==
The origin of the unique toponym Ballona is much disputed and possibly unknowable. Various theories have been exchanged for more than 150 years.

- 1875: Misspelling of Ballena, Spanish word for whale (various dead whales did wash up near Ballona during the 19th century), or misspelling of Spanish “valle” meaning valley
- 1893: An introduction to Southern California in the Los Angeles Herald noted “Ballona, meaning and derivation unknown; not Spanish.”
- 1939: “The origin of the word Ballona is in doubt.” Discounts whale theory; Cristobal Machado, an heir of the rancho family, suggests it’s somehow derivative of “bay”
