= Los Angeles Township, California =

Former township in California, US

Coordinates: 34.1487°N 118.3731°W

Los Angeles Township was a defunct township in Los Angeles County, California, United States. It existed prior to the abolition of townships in California in the 1870s. Los Angeles Township consisted of areas surrounding the original city lands of Los Angeles, then a four-league square bordered by Hoover Street, Fountain Avenue, Indiana Street and Exposition Boulevard. These included the San Fernando Valley and present-day West Los Angeles and East Los Angeles. Most of this area has now been annexed to the city of Los Angeles, but a few portions exist as independent cities, including Glendale, Burbank and Santa Monica.

The 1860 census reported a population of 1,231 and the 1870 census reported a population of 2,757. By the 1880 census, the township had been abolished; some of it had been annexed to the City of Los Angeles and the rest was divided among the San Fernando Township (San Fernando Valley), La Ballona Township (Westside) and San Antonio Township (Huntington Park area).
