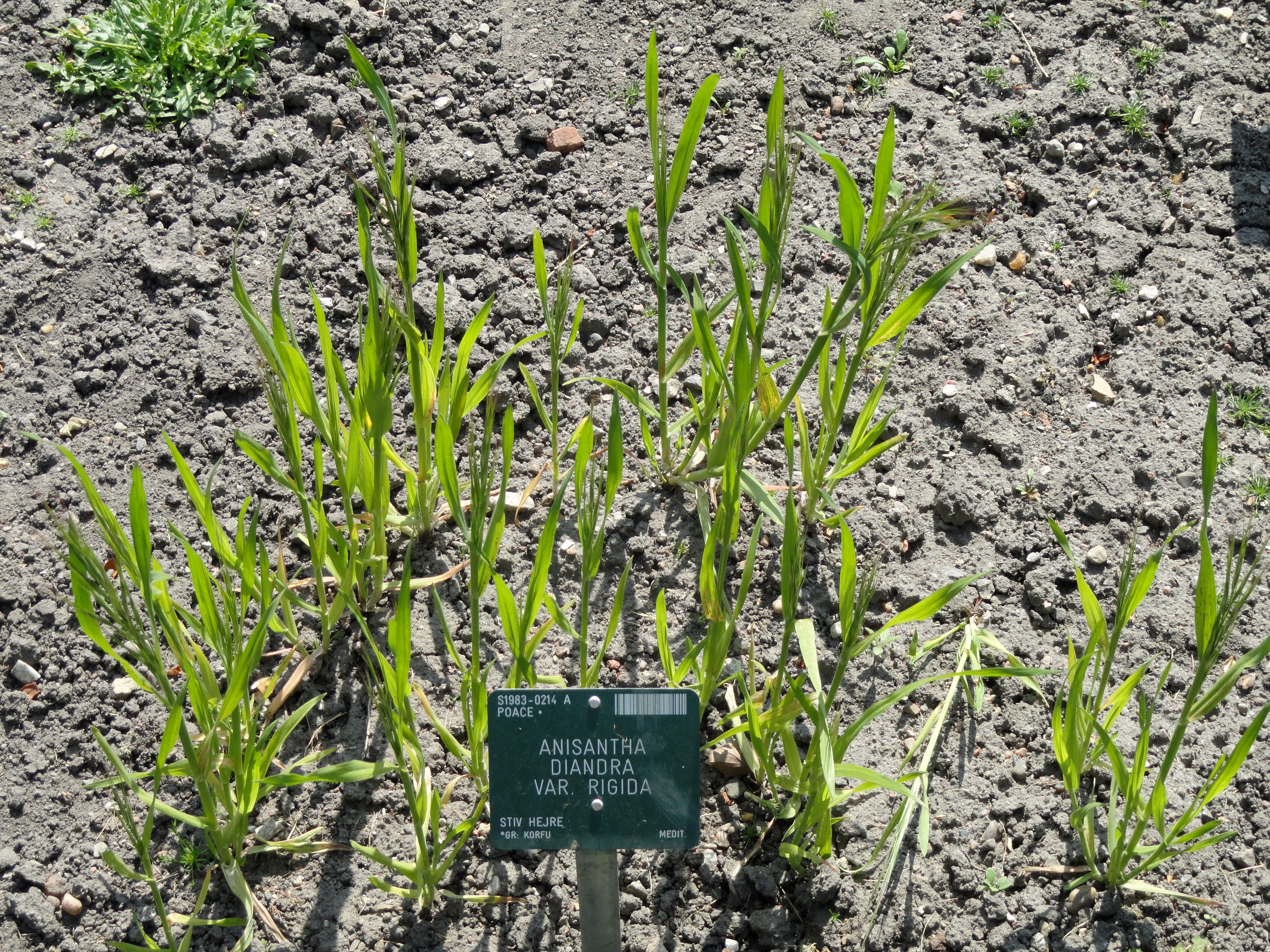
- At the Copenhagen Botanical Garden

Scientific classification
- Kingdom: Plantae
- Clade: Tracheophytes
- Clade: Angiosperms
- Clade: Monocots
- Clade: Commelinids
- Order: Poales
- Family: Poaceae
- Subfamily: Pooideae
- Genus: Bromus
- Species: B. rigidus

Binomial name
- Bromus rigidus Roth

= Bromus rigidus =

Species of grass

Bromus rigidus, the ripgut brome, is a grass native to Eurasia and naturalized in North America. The specific epithet rigidus means rigid or stiff.

== Description ==
Bromus rigidus is an annual grass growing 0.3–1 m (1 ft 0 in – 3 ft 3 in) tall. The culms, leaves, and panicle branches are all pubescent or harsh. The erect or ascending panicle has short branches that terminate in four to nine flowered spikelets. The reddish spikelets are 6–10 cm (2.4–3.9 in) long, including the awns measuring 3–4 cm (1.2–1.6 in) long. The first glume has one nerve and the second has three. The lance-attenuate lemmas are unequal, with the lower having a long tooth on each side of the awn and the upper tapering to the beak. The scabrous lemmas are strongly ciliate. The anthers are approximately 1 mm (0.039 in) long.

The common name "ripgut brome" refers to the heavy sclerotization of the species, creating a hazard to livestock. The seeds of the plant can penetrate the skin of livestock and the callus and awns can penetrate the mouth, eyes, and intestines of livestock.

Bromus rigidus differs from the closely related Bromus diandrus in its shorter laminar hairs and more compact panicle with shorter spikelet branches. The elliptical abscission scars on rachillae and elongated lemma calluses of B. rigidus further distinguish the species from B. diandrus, with the latter possessing more short and circular scars and calluses. B. diandrus is susceptible to rust such as Puccinia bromoides whereas B. rigidus is unaffected.

== Habitat and distribution ==
Bromus rigidus is common in waste places and rare near ports in the United States, occurring around areas such as Maryland, District of Columbia and north to Massachusetts.

In Europe the grass occurs in the south and west, growing in weedy or disturbed areas, road verges, and ports.
