= Ranchos of Orange County =

The County of Orange was established in 1889 by founders William Spurgeon and James McFadden. The City of Santa Ana became the county seat the same year. Prior to its formation, the Orange County lands were part of Los Angeles County.

Further back in history, California lands were organized into Spanish land grants or "Ranchos". In the case of Orange County, there is record of José Antonio Yorba and Juan Pablo Peralta (nephew) being granted Rancho Santiago de Santa Ana in 1810, year of the commencement of the war of Mexican Independence. Santiago de Santa Ana is recorded as the only Orange County land grant given under Spanish Rule.

Other surrounding land grants in Orange County were granted and recorded after 1821, that is, after the war of Mexican Independence and by the Mexican government. Some modern day cities in Orange County retain the names of the Mexican land grants as agreed upon in the Treaty of Guadalupe Hidalgo.

== List of Orange County Ranchos ==
Grant	Granted	Grantor	Grantee	Area(s)
Rancho Los Nietos	1784, 1833 partitioned into 5 ranchos	Spanish Governor Pedro Fages, partition by Mexican Governor José Figueroa	José Manuel Nieto	Ranchos: Los Alamitos, Las Bolsas, Los Cerritos, Los Coyotes, Santa Gertrudes, Rancho Palo Alto
Santiago de Santa Ana	1810	Spanish King Ferdinand VII-Governor José Joaquín de Arrillaga	José Antonio Yorba	Santa Ana, Costa Mesa, Orange, Tustin, El Modena, Olive
Cañón de Santa Ana	1834	Mexican Governor José Figueroa	Bernardo Yorba	Yorba Linda, Yorba Hacienda
Los Alamitos	1834	Mexican Governor José Figueroa	Abel Stearns	Los Alamitos, Long Beach, Seal Beach
Las Bolsas	1834	Mexican Governor José Figueroa	Maria Catarina Ruiz	Huntington Beach, Westminster, Garden Grove,
Los Coyotes	1834	Mexican Governor José Figueroa	Juan José Nieto	Buena Park, Stanton, Cerritos, La Mirada
San Juan Cajón de Santa Ana	1837	Mexican Governor Juan Alvarado	Juan Pacífico Ontiveros	Anaheim, Fullerton, Placentia
La Habra	1839	Mexican Governor Juan Alvarado	Mariano Reyes Roldan	La Habra
La Bolsa Chica	1841	Mexican Governor Juan Alvarado	Joaquín Ruíz	Bolsa Chica Ecological Reserve, Huntington Beach, Sunset Beach
San Joaquín	1842	Mexican Governor Juan Bautista Alvarado	José Antonio Andres Sepúlveda	Upper Newport Bay, Newport Beach, Corona del mar, southern Irvine
Niguel	1842	Mexican Governor Juan Bautista Alvarado	Juan Ávila	Laguna Canyon, Laguna Niguel, Laguna Beach, Laguna Hills, Dana Point
Cañada de Los Alisos		Mexican Governor Juan Bautista Alvarado	Jose Antonio Fernando Serrano	Lake Forest, Irvine, Orange County Great Park, Jose Serrano Adobe, Orange County District 5.
Misión Vieja	1845	Mexican Governor Pío Pico	John (Don Juan) Forster	Mission Viejo; San Juan Capistrano—(on land to south with no title grant)
Boca de la Playa	1846	Mexican Governor Pío Pico	Emigdio Vejar	San Clemente; Dana Point and Capistrano Beach—(on land to west with no title grant)
Lomas de Santiago	1846	Mexican Governor Pío Pico	Teodosio Yorba	Northern Irvine, Silverado, Modjeska Canyon, Black Star Canyon
Trabuco	1846	Mexican Governor Juan Bautista Alvarado	Santiago Argüello	Trabuco Canyon, Coto de Caza, Trabuco Creek

== See also ==
- Ranchos of California
- Ranchos of Los Angeles County
