= Rancho La Bolsa Chica =

Mexican land grant given in 1841

Coordinates: 33.730°N 118.020°W

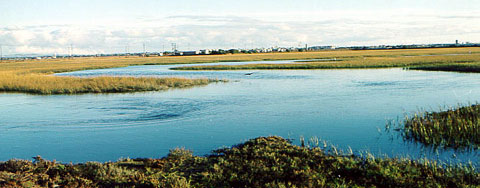
Marsh wetlands, with bolsa chicas—little pockets, in the Bolsa Chica Ecological Reserve.

Rancho La Bolsa Chica was an 8,107-acre (32.81 km^{2}) Mexican land grant in present-day coastal northwestern Orange County, California given in 1841 by Governor Juan Alvarado to Joaquín Ruiz. The name means "little pocket", and refers to pockets of land amongst the marsh wetlands of the Santa Ana River estuary. The rancho lands include the present day city of Huntington Beach, the community of Sunset Beach, and the significant Bolsa Chica Ecological Reserve.

== History ==
At the request of Manuel Nieto heirs, governor José Figueroa in 1834, officially declared the 167,000-acre (680 km^{2}) Rancho Los Nietos grant under Mexican rule and ordered its partition into five smaller ranchos: Las Bolsas, Los Alamitos, Los Cerritos, Los Coyotes, and Santa Gertrudes.

Maria Catarina Ruiz (widow of Jose Antonio Nieto, son of Manuel Nieto) received Las Bolsas. The two square league Rancho La Bolsa Chica was given to Joaquín Ruiz, the brother of Maria Catarina Ruiz, in 1841.

With the cession of California to the United States following the Mexican-American War, the 1848 Treaty of Guadalupe Hidalgo provided that the land grants would be honored. As required by the Land Act of 1851, a claim for Rancho La Bolsa Chica was filed with the Public Land Commission in 1852, and was patented to Joaquín Ruiz in 1874.

By 1860 Rancho La Bolsa Chica was acquired by Abel Stearns, the most significant land owner in Southern California at the time, and in 1868 it became part of the Robinson Trust.

== Landmarks ==
Archeological items such as cog stones, from the Tongva settlements preceding the rancho at the estuary for 8,000 years, are at the Bowers Museum in Santa Ana.

== See also ==
- Ranchos of California
- List of Ranchos of California
