= Rancho Los Nietos =

One of the largest Californian ranchos

Coordinates: 33.86°N 118.01°W

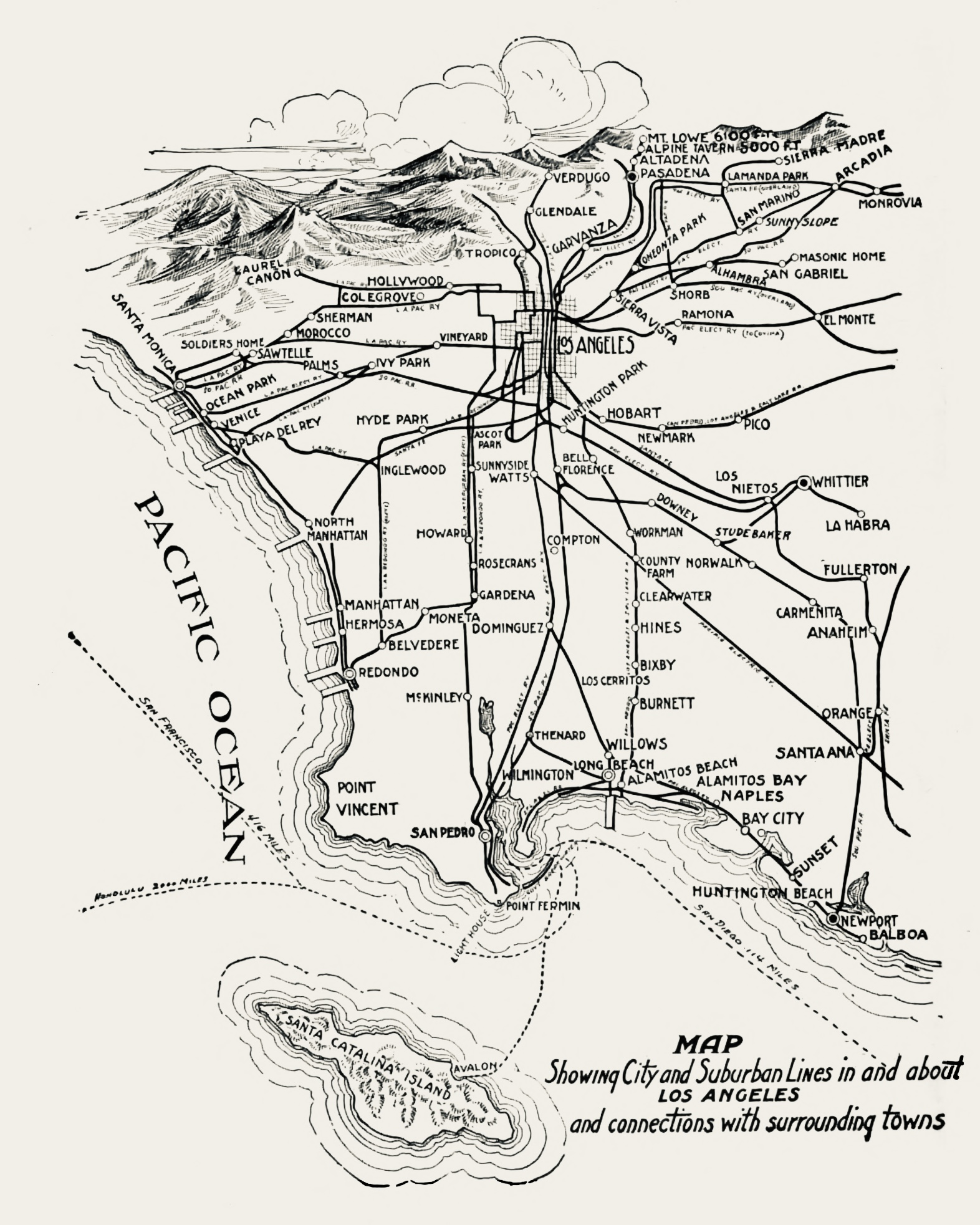
Los Nietos railway station, pictured on a 1912 Los Angeles map

Rancho Los Nietos was one of the first, and the largest, Spanish land concession in Alta California. Located in present-day Los Angeles County and Orange County, California. Rancho Los Nietos was awarded to Manuel Nieto in 1784. After an appeal by the San Gabriel Mission padres, Rancho Los Nietos was later reduced and Rancho Paso de Bartolo was once again a possession of the mission. The rest of the rancho remained intact until 1834, when Governor Jose Figueroa officially declared the Rancho Los Nietos grant under Mexican rule and ordered its partition into six smaller ranchos.

Today, all parts of the following places are located on what was once Rancho Los Nietos, spanning the cities of Southeast LA and north Orange County:

- Anaheim
- Artesia
- Bellflower
- Buena Park
- Bolsa Chica State Beach—Bolsa Chica Reserve
- Cerritos
- Cypress
- Downey
- Fullerton
- Garden Grove
- Huntington Beach
- Lakewood
- Long Beach
- Los Alamitos
- Los Nietos
- Naples
- Norwalk
- Santa Fe Springs
- Seal Beach
- Sunset Beach
- Whittier

== History ==
=== Spanish grant ===
In 1784, Spanish governor Pedro Fages granted to Manuel Nieto, a former sergeant in the Spanish army, provisional use of all land between the Santa Ana River and the Los Angeles River from the Mission San Gabriel Arcángel to the sea.

The original grant was 300,000 acres (1,200 km^{2}), but the San Gabriel Mission contested the Los Nietos grant on the grounds that it encroached upon the southern portion of its property. A decision in favor of the mission was reached and Rancho Los Nietos was reduced to nearly half of its original size, but still leaving Corporal Nieto with 167,000 acres (680 km^{2}). At first it was called La Zanja, but later it was known simply as Rancho Los Nietos.

Upon Manuel Nieto's death in 1804, Rancho Los Nietos passed to his wife and four children.

=== Mexican declaration and partition ===
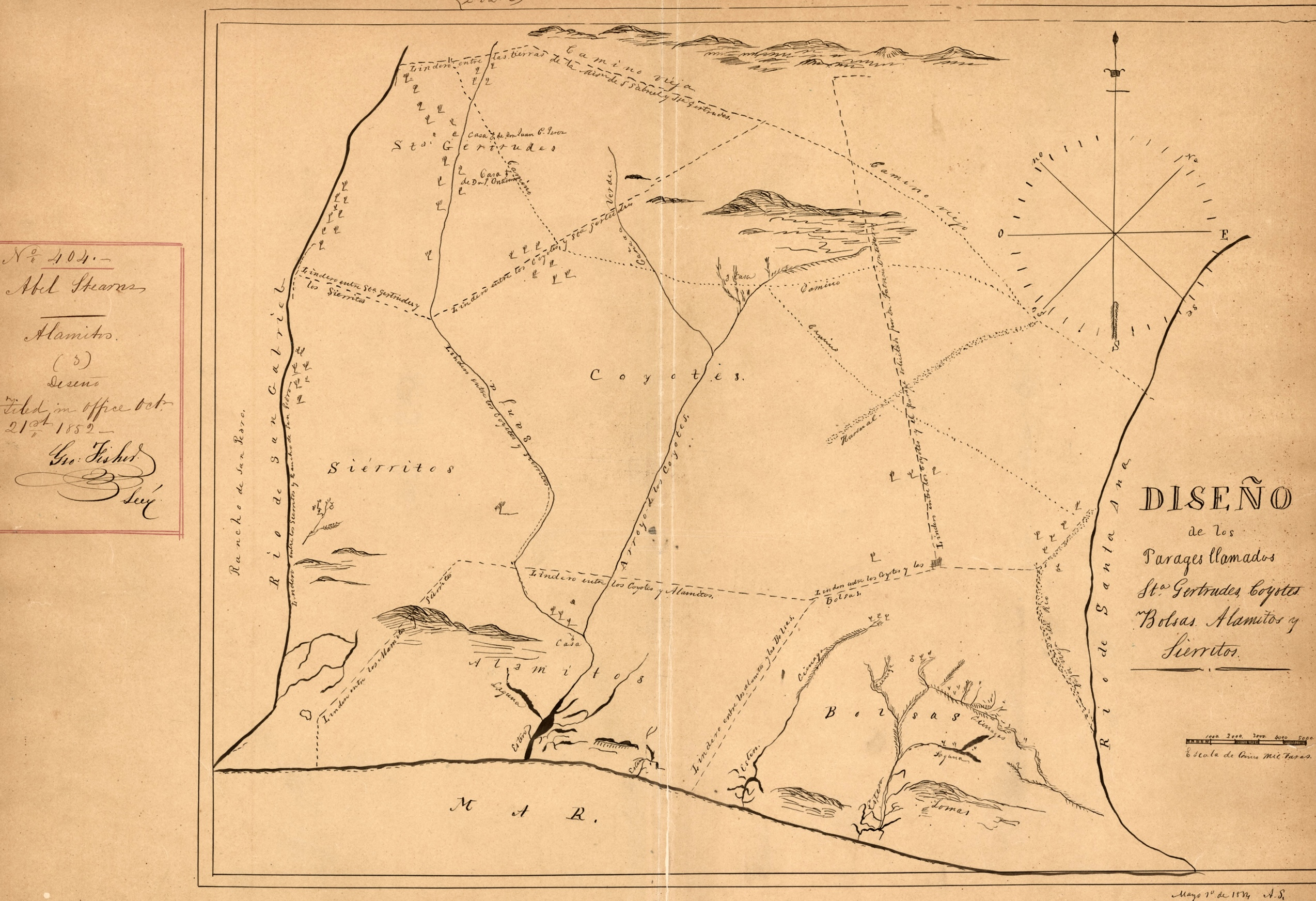
Diseño depicting Ranchos Los Alamitos, Los Cerritos, Santa Gertrudes, Los Coyotes, Las Bolsas, 1852

The rancho remained intact until 1833, when the Nieto heirs petitioned Mexican Governor José Figueroa for a partition and distribution of the land. In 1834, governor Figueroa officially declared the Los Nietos grant under Mexican rule and ordered its partition into six smaller ranchos.

1834 Partition of Rancho Los Nietos
Name	Size	Disposition
Los Alamitos	28,612 acres (115.79 km^{2})	Juan Jose Nieto
Las Bolsas	33,460 acres (135.4 km^{2})	Catarina Ruiz (widow of Jose Antonio Nieto)
Los Cerritos	27,054 acres (109.48 km^{2})	Manuela Nieto de Cota and her husband Guillermo Cota
Los Coyotes	48,806 acres (197.51 km^{2})	Juan Jose Nieto
Santa Gertrudes	21,298 acres (86.19 km^{2})	Josefa Cota (widow of Antonio Maria Nieto)
Palo Alto	unknown	Juan Jose Nieto

Rancho Palo Alto was the smallest of the six ranchos. It is unknown exactly where or how large was Rancho Palo Alto as it did not appear on the partition map. It included the Coyote Hills and most of the Arroyo de los Coyotes, and may have been combined into Rancho Los Coyotes.

=== Legacy ===
Los Nietos Road in Santa Fe Springs and the unincorporated community known as West Whittier-Los Nietos are named after the rancho.
