= Surfside, California =

Gated community in Seal Beach, California

- Gated community of Seal Beach
- Surfside Colony, Ltd.
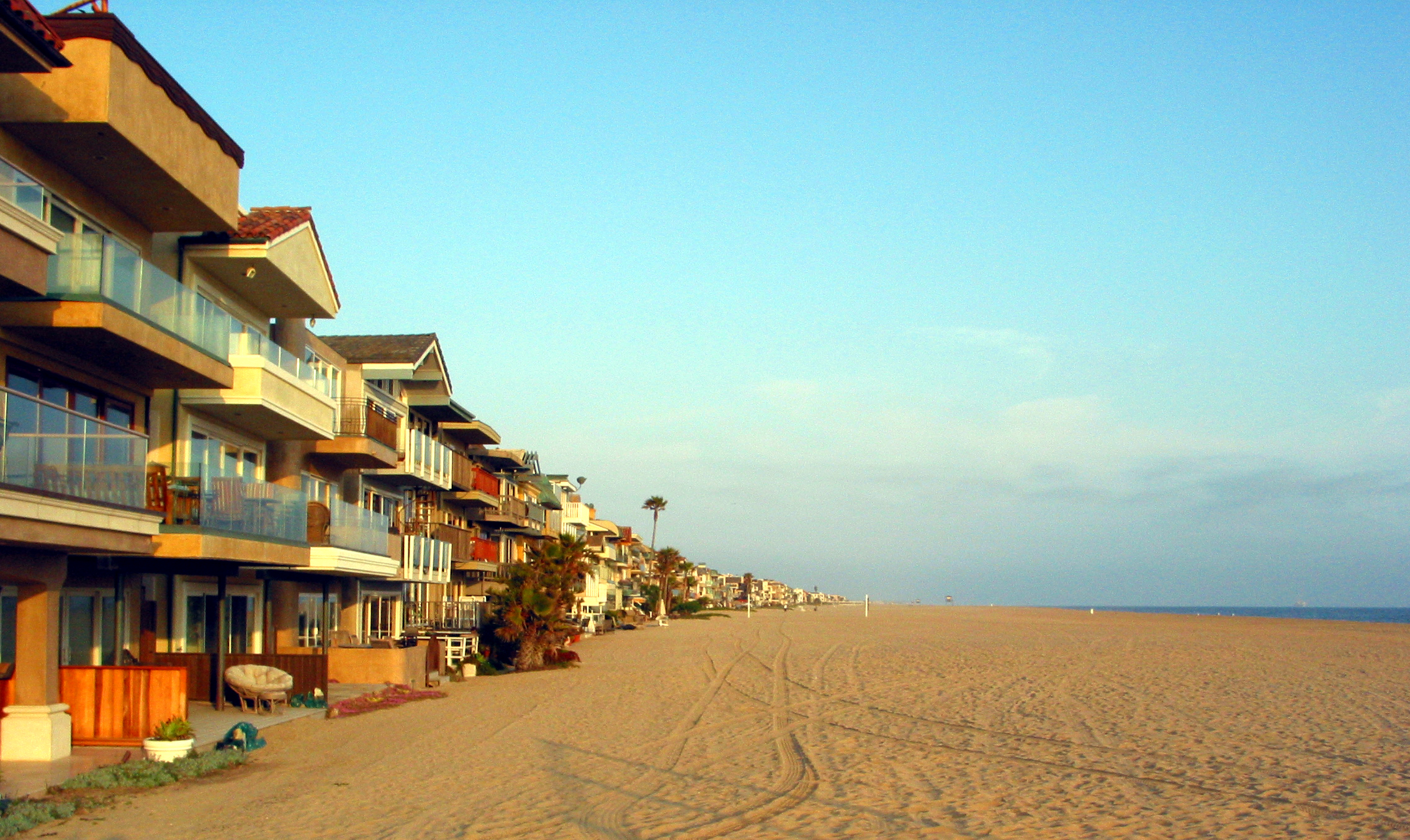
- Looking SE toward Huntington Beach

- Location in the United States
- Coordinates: = 33°43′44″N 118°5′2″W
- Country: United States
- State: California
- County: Orange
- City: Seal Beach

Area
  - Total: 0.62 sq mi (1.6 km^{2})
- Elevation: 11 ft (3.4 m)

Population (2010)
  - Total: 456
  - Density: 4,321/sq mi (1,668/km^{2})
- Time zone: UTC-8 (PST)
  - Summer (DST): UTC-7 (PDT)
- ZIP code: 90743
- Website: Welcome to Surfside!

Surfside (or Surfside Colony) is a small gated community with three rows of houses, lettered A, B, and C. Surfside is part of the city of Seal Beach, California and is located on the west side of Pacific Coast Highway, southwest of the Naval Weapons Station Seal Beach between the station and the Huntington Beach community of Sunset Beach. It is also near the Huntington Beach community of Huntington Harbour. The southern entrance to the Surfside Colony is easy to spot by the water tower (which was built into a house) that can be seen from Pacific Coast Highway.

The Surfside Colony is served by the Surfside Colony Community Services Tax District and the Surfside Colony Storm Water Protection Tax District. Lifeguard services are provided by the city of Seal Beach.

== History ==
Surfside Colony was begun in 1929 as an oceanside resort community. It was incorporated with the state of California in 1930. There were originally plans to develop both sides of Pacific Coast Highway (with D and E rows of houses on the east side), but these plans never materialized. A tunnel, which still exists though it is inaccessible, was built under Pacific Coast Highway to facilitate easy transit back and forth.

During World War II, the U.S. Navy developed the area to the north of Surfside as an ammunition depot. A large jetty and channel were built to allow ships to dock. This development altered Surfside and its beachfront significantly. Changes in wave patterns and resulting erosion have continued to plague the community since then. Every few years, the U.S. Army Corps of Engineers must work to replenish and rebuild the beach, dredging and refilling with millions of cubic yards of sand.

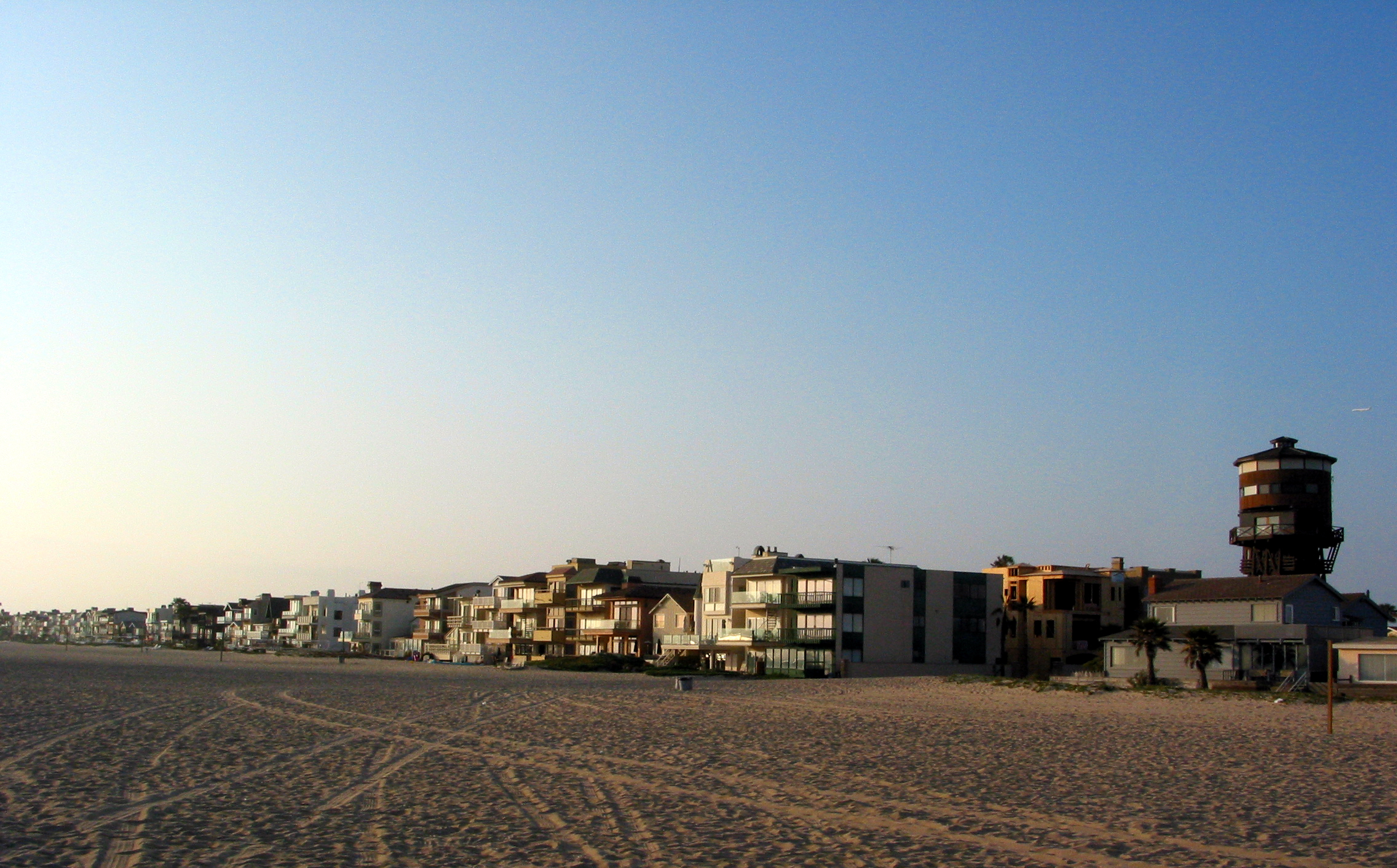
Looking NW toward Long Beach

== Geography and climate ==
The colony of Surfside is located adjacent to the Pacific Ocean beach. It is said that no home in the colony is more than 75 feet (23 m) from the sand. Also visible from Surfside is a portion of Anaheim Bay, which is across Pacific Coast Highway and connects to Huntington Harbour.

The climate of Surfside is moderate with temperatures often hovering around 70 °F (21 °C). The record high for this area has been reported at 111 °F (44 °C), with the record low at 25 °F (−4 °C). It is not unusual to have cool evenings with temperatures in the 50s during the summer and the low 40s in winter. There is often a brisk wind at Surfside, making it a favorite spot for kite surfers.

Over the years, the winter surf has sometimes been severe, destroying homes in the colony. Especially severe storms and high tides wreaked havoc in 1952 and 1953, and again in 1963. Into the 1970s and 1980s, erosion posed problems for the community. Rock barriers, sand bags, and temporary berms have all been used to safeguard homes. In 1983, high tides flooded many of the residences in Surfside.

== Demographics and housing ==
According to 2010 census data, there were 456 residents of Surfside living in 187 housing units. The area of the colony is 0.1 square miles. The median age was listed as 45.3, and 89.5 percent of the population was white.

Surfside has approximately 256 houses. 25% are occupied seasonally or less than full-time. Some homes have been in families for as many as four generations.

The colony has a wide variety of housing styles, which contributes to its charming and laid-back ambiance. Current housing styles include everything from small beach cottages to large three-story mansions. Many of the homes are rented out by their owners. The first homes in Surfside were small beach cottages. In 1929, these homes sold for as little as $700. In general, "A" Row houses are the most highly priced as they have unobstructed views of the Pacific Ocean extending all the way to Santa Catalina Island and sit directly on the beach.

== Education ==
The Los Alamitos Unified School District serves Surfside.

== Miscellanea ==
The U.S. Postal Service does not deliver mail to the houses in Surfside. However, there is a full-service post office inside of the colony. Each house has a post office box there.

Surfside consists of three rows of houses, called the A, B, and C rows. The A row is on the sand; the C row is adjacent Pacific Coast Highway. There is a short road entering the colony from Pacific Coast Highway called Phillips Street. House addresses are designated by a letter and a number. For example, "1 A" is the first house on the sand at the southern end of the colony. This sometimes creates a confusion when a physical street address is required.

The U.S. Postal Service lists their address within the colony as 89 B Surfside Avenue. A and B row homes have a Surfside Avenue address. C row homes have a Pacific Avenue address. Pacific is the street that runs from the southeast exit of the colony through neighboring Sunset Beach.

== Notable people ==
Bradley Nowell lived in this gated community while being a successful lead singer for the reggae rock and punk band Sublime. After his death in 1996, he was cremated and his ashes were spread over the water.

Former U.S. Representative for California's 45th district, Republican Michelle Steel, was a resident of the community.

Sean Collins-Founder of Surfline The story goes that before founding Surfline, when Sean Collins was just developing his passion for surf forecasting, he used to sit up on the roof of his Surfside house and time south swells hitting the Huntington Harbor jetty with a stopwatch.
