= Abel Stearns =

American politician (1798–1871)

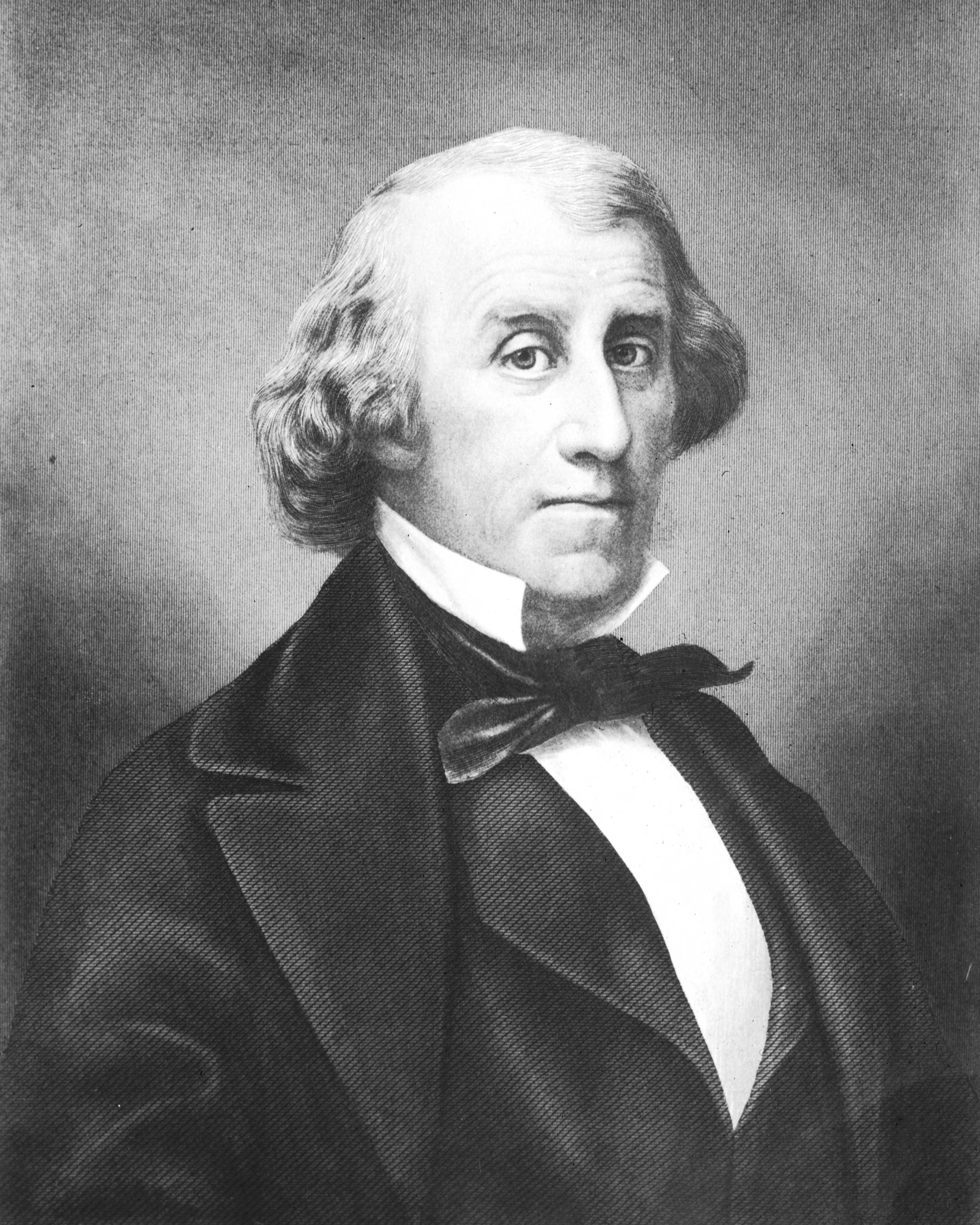
- Stearns c. 1840–1860

Member of the California State Assembly
- In office January 7, 1861 – January 6, 1862
- Preceded by: Multi-member district
- Succeeded by: Multi-member district
- Constituency: 1st district
- In office January 6, 1851 – January 5, 1852
- Preceded by: Constituency established
- Succeeded by: Multi-member district
- Constituency: 2nd district

Personal details
- Born: February 9, 1798 Lunenburg, Massachusetts U.S.
- Died: August 23, 1871 (aged 73) San Francisco, California, U.S.
- Citizenship: American; Mexican
- Spouse: Arcadia Bandini
- Relatives: John Tracy Gaffey (son-in-law); Juan Bandini (father-in-law)
- Occupation: Entrepreneur, Rancher
- Known for: Early California pioneer

Abel Stearns (February 9, 1798 – August 23, 1871) was an American trader who came to the Pueblo de Los Angeles, Alta California in 1829 and became a major landowner and cattle rancher and one of the area's wealthiest citizens.

== Early life ==
Stearns was born in Lunenburg, Massachusetts, the son of Elizabeth (née Goodrich) and Levi Stearns, a farmer. His parents were both from families that came from England in the 17th century, but they both died when he was twelve. Stearns was a crew member for ships sailing to China and the West Indies for ten years, eventually becoming a supercargo. In 1826, he arrived in Veracruz, Mexico, where he became a naturalized citizen in 1828.

== Los Angeles ==
In 1829, Stearns emigrated to Monterey, California, and then settled in the Pueblo de los Ángeles in present-day Los Angeles, California. He obtained a government concession to build a warehouse at San Pedro, the nearest seaport. Later, he established a stagecoach route connecting San Pedro Bay with the Los Angeles pueblo. In 1831, he built a three-story flour mill on North Spring Street, Los Angeles. Soon, Stearns became one of the most prominent and influential citizens of the pueblo.

In 1842 Stearns bought his first rancho, the 28,000-acre (110 km^{2}) Rancho Los Alamitos between Los Angeles and the harbor. A drought occurred between 1862 and 1864 which was said to have resulted in the death of 50,000 cattle on Stearns land alone. Stearns mortgaged the rancho to Michael Reese, who then purchased it at a sheriff's sale. Reese's estate was then sold to John W. Bixby and Isaias W. Hellman, a founder of the Farmers and Merchants Bank.

In 1842 Stearns made the first recorded shipment of California gold to the U.S. Mint. On July 8, 1843, his package of 1,843 ounces of placer gold, valued at $19 an ounce, was deposited in the Philadelphia Mint by Alfred Robinson.

Following the Mexican-American War, Stearns represented Los Angeles to the US military government of California, 1848–1850. He was a delegate to the 1849 California Constitutional Convention, representing the district of Los Angeles. Later he was California State Assemblyman, and a Los Angeles County Supervisor and a member of the Los Angeles Common Council, the legislative branch of the city government.

== Ranchos ==
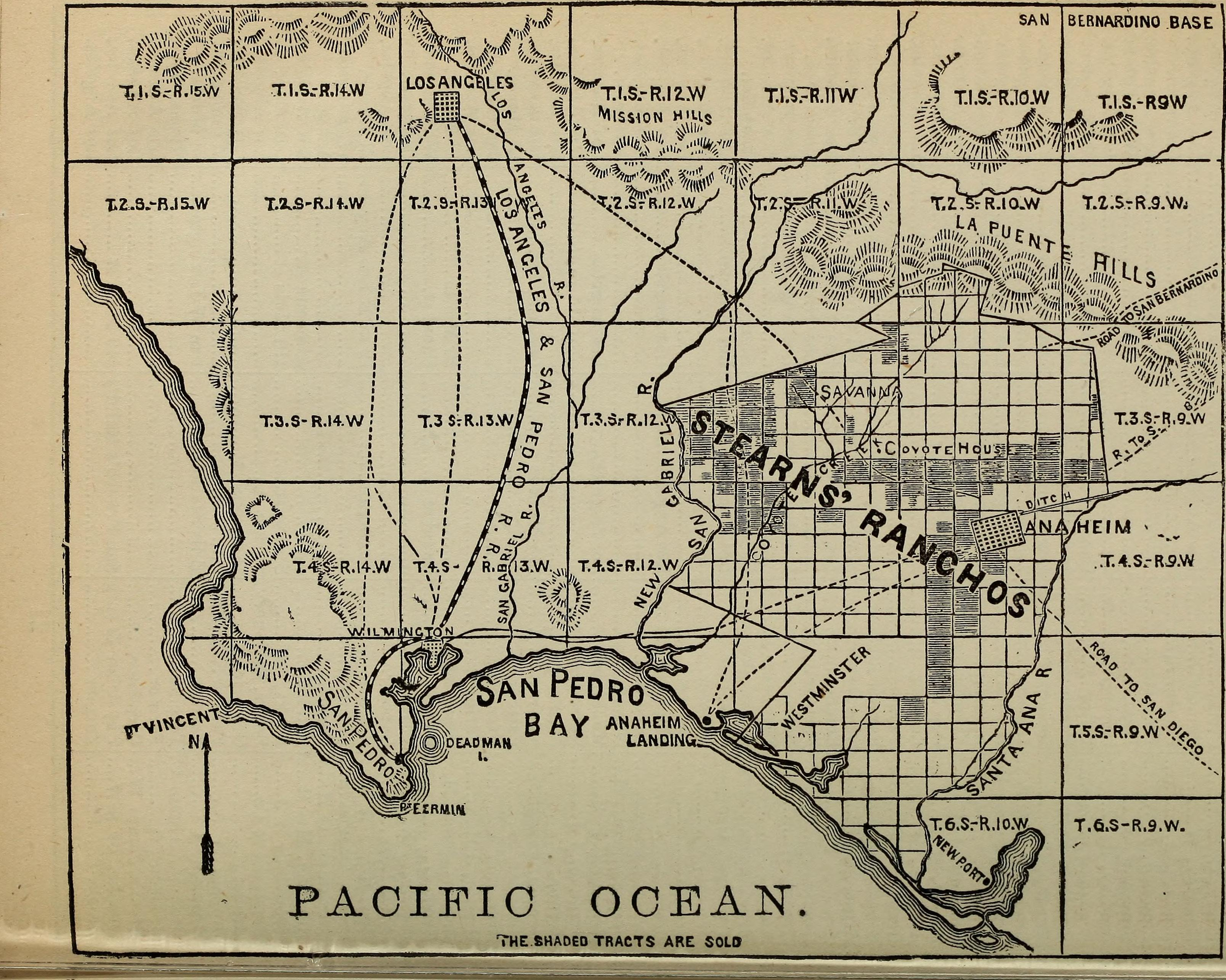
Stearns's ranchos, 1875

By 1860, Stearns was the most important land owner in Southern California, and owned Rancho La Habra, Rancho Los Coyotes, Rancho San Juan Cajón de Santa Ana, Rancho Las Bolsas, Rancho La Bolsa Chica, Rancho Jurupa and Rancho La Sierra (Sepulveda). He was hit hard by the drought of 1863–64, which caused the loss of thousands of cattle. By 1868 he had suffered such financial reverses that he mortgaged all his ranch assets in what were then Los Angeles and San Bernardino counties.

=== Robinson Trust ===
To obtain the necessary operating capital, he formed a real estate sales partnership with Alfred Robinson and four San Francisco investors; Samuel Brannan, E. F. Northam, Charles B. Polhemus, and Edward Martin. It became known as the Robinson Trust in 1868. He turned over 177,796 acres (720 km^{2}) to the Trust, including all but one of his ranchos.

The era of the large cattle ranchos was waning. In its place came agriculture, as ranchos were broken up and generally sold in 40-acre (160,000 m^{2}) farms and ranches. The Robinson Trust acted as sales agents for the subdivisions. To gain maximum coverage for their campaign, they linked themselves to the California Immigrant Union and helped guide that organization's sales pitches.

Despite considerable friction between Stearns and the other members of the trust, the Robinson Trust succeeded. By 1870 Stearns had escaped the debts incurred by the drought of the 1860s and was on his way to accumulating another fortune.

The Robinson Trust owners incorporated as the Stearns Ranchos Company in 1887 and the company was dissolved in 1927.

== Family life ==
Stearns was nicknamed "Cara de Caballo" (Horse Face), because of his long-jawed countenance. In 1841, he married Arcadia Bandini of the wealthy Bandini family. They lived and entertained at their Los Angeles home, the historic Don Abel Stearns House.

Stearns died on August 23, 1871, at age 72 in the Grand Hotel, San Francisco, California. He was interred at Calvary Cemetery, Los Angeles.

== See also ==
- Casa De San Pedro in 1834 the Casa was sold to Abel Stearns.
- List of pre-statehood mayors of Los Angeles, California
- History of Los Angeles
- Ranchos of California
  - List of Ranchos of California
