= Sunset Beach, California =

- Neighborhood of Huntington Beach
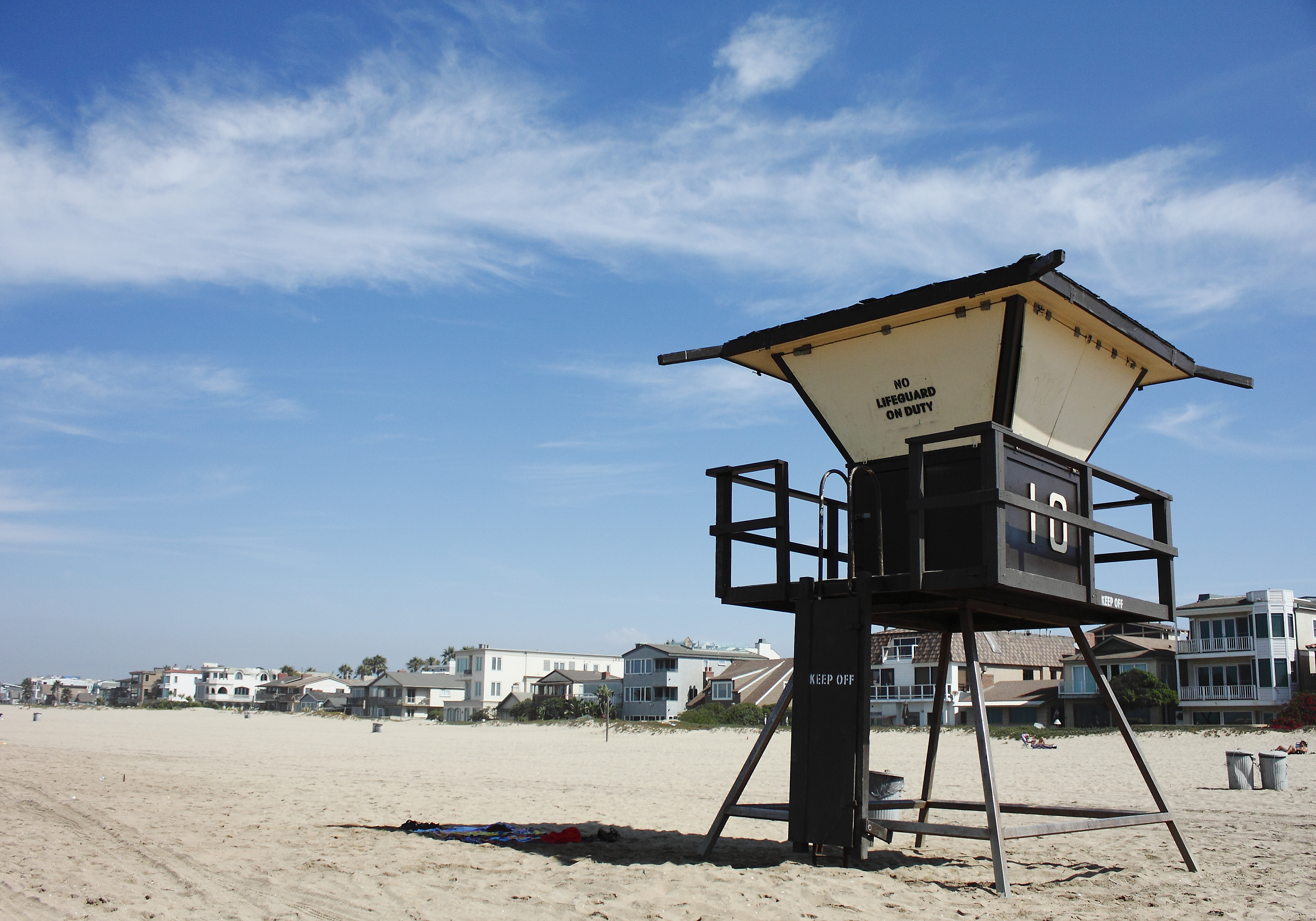
- Lifeguard station #10 at Sunset Beach

- Position in California.
- Coordinates: 33°43′04″N 118°04′21″W
- Country: United States
- State: California
- County: Orange
- City: Huntington Beach
- CDP designation: September 8, 1904
- Annexed into Huntington Beach: August 2011

Area
  - Total: 0.197 sq mi (0.511 km^{2})
  - Land: 0.192 sq mi (0.498 km^{2})
  - Water: 0.0050 sq mi (0.013 km^{2}) 2.49%
- Elevation: 5.3 ft (1.6 m)

Population (2010)
  - Total: 971
  - Density: 5,050/sq mi (1,950/km^{2})
- ZIP code: 90742
- Area code: 562

Sunset Beach is a Huntington Beach beachfront community in Orange County, California. It was established on September 8, 1904 and developed as a result of the 1920 discovery of oil in the Huntington Beach Oil Field. The census-designated place of Sunset Beach, and its population of 971 as of the 2010 census, was annexed by Huntington Beach in 2011. The elevation is 5.3 feet (1.6 m) above sea level and the community is stretched out along Pacific Coast Highway bracketed by the ocean and Huntington Harbour.

== History ==
Sunset Beach was established in 1904 and developed as a result of the 1920 discovery of oil in the Huntington Beach Oil Field. On August 2, 2010, the Huntington Beach city council, in a 5–2 vote, voted to annex Sunset Beach making the community a part of the much larger Huntington Beach. The annexation was to have officially begun in January 2011 but a group of residents filed suit on December 9, 2010, to stop the annexation due to new taxes that would be imposed on them once they become part of Huntington Beach. A hearing for a preliminary injunction was scheduled for January 19, 2011, in Orange County Superior Court. Huntington Beach officially annexed Sunset Beach in August 2011.

== Geography ==
According to the United States Census Bureau, the CDP covered an area of 0.2 square miles (0.52 km^{2}), 97.51% of it land, and 2.49% of it water.

== Demographics ==
The 2010 United States census reported that Sunset Beach had a population of 971. The population density was 4,919.3 inhabitants per square mile (1,899.4/km^{2}). The racial makeup of Sunset Beach was 863 (88.9%) White, 4 (0.4%) African American, 6 (0.6%) Native American, 42 (4.3%) Asian, 2 (0.2%) Pacific Islander, 18 (1.9%) from other races, and 36 (3.7%) from two or more races. Hispanic or Latino of any race were 79 persons (8.1%).

The 2010 Census reported that 971 people (100% of the population) lived in households, 0 (0%) lived in non-institutionalized group quarters, and 0 (0%) were institutionalized.

There were 515 households, out of which 69 (13.4%) had children under the age of 18 living in them, 179 (34.8%) were opposite-sex married couples living together, 19 (3.7%) had a female householder with no husband present, 23 (4.5%) had a male householder with no wife present. There were 29 (5.6%) unmarried opposite-sex partnerships, and 5 (1.0%) same-sex married couples or partnerships. 224 households (43.5%) were made up of individuals, and 48 (9.3%) had someone living alone who was 65 years of age or older. The average household size was 1.89. There were 221 families (42.9% of all households); the average family size was 2.64.

The population was spread out, with 106 people (10.9%) under the age of 18, 72 people (7.4%) aged 18 to 24, 280 people (28.8%) aged 25 to 44, 365 people (37.6%) aged 45 to 64, and 148 people (15.2%) who were 65 years of age or older. The median age was 46.9 years. For every 100 females, there were 120.2 males. For every 100 females age 18 and over, there were 117.3 males.

There were 641 housing units at an average density of 3,247.5 units per square mile (1,253.9 units/km^{2}), of which 211 (41.0%) were owner-occupied, and 304 (59.0%) were occupied by renters. The homeowner vacancy rate was 4.4%; the rental vacancy rate was 8.9%. 455 people (46.9% of the population) lived in owner-occupied housing units and 516 people (53.1%) lived in rental housing units.

== Economy ==
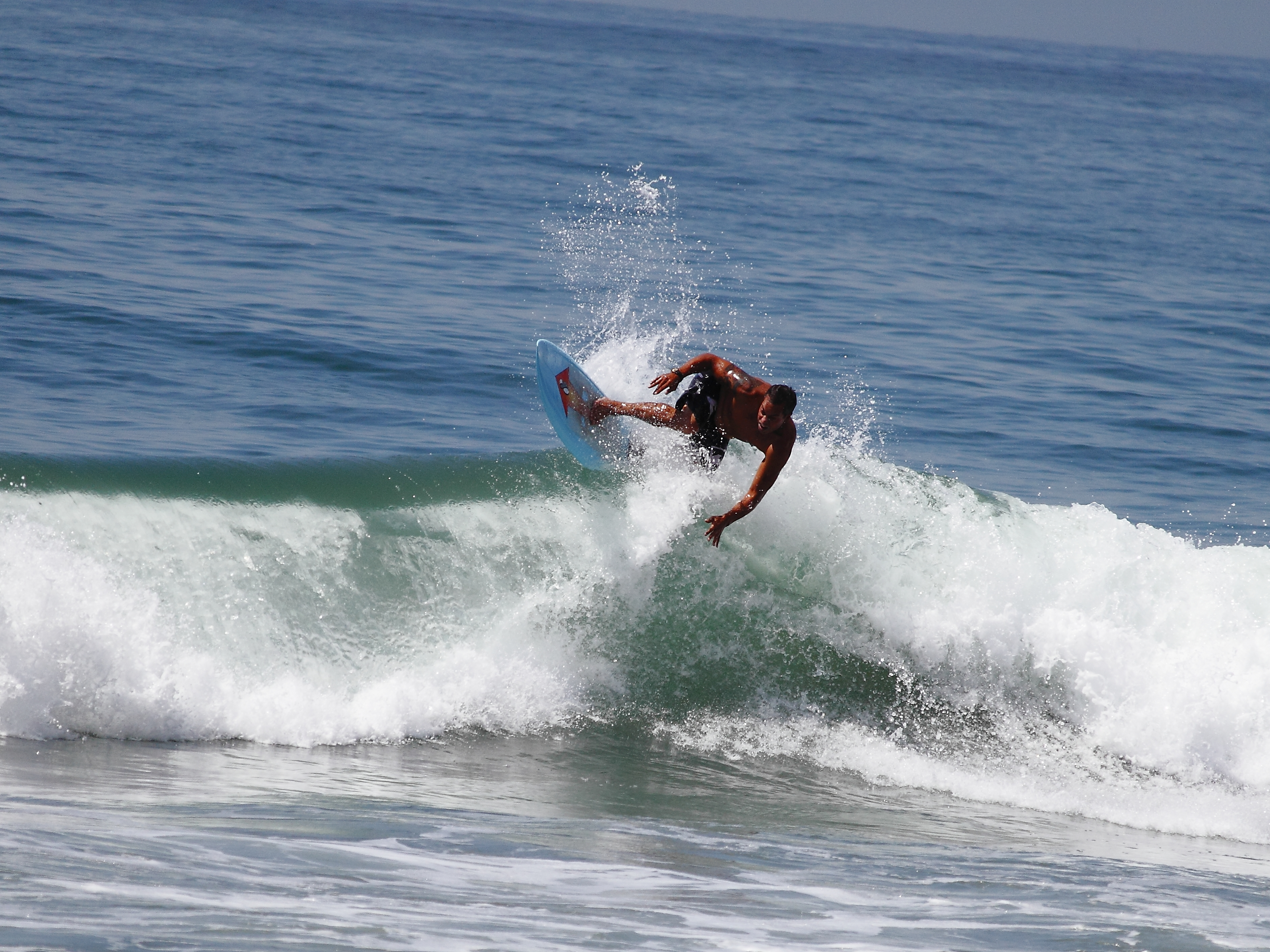
A surfer rides the break at Sunset Beach

Sunset Beach has a number of restaurants and bars, including Captain Jack's, founded by noted surfer Jack Haley Sr., the father of basketball player Jack Haley.

== Arts and culture ==
The Sunset Beach Art Festival is held annually during Mothers Day weekend. It was created in 1948 by the local women's group as a way to promote education and social activities and was initially called the Beachcomber's Carnival. The festival generates $30,000 to $40,000, with all the proceeds going to charity.

== Parks and recreation ==
Sunset Beach features one of the widest beaches in southern California. Running parallel to the beach, from the north of town to the southern edge is the Green Belt, a 14 acre park. Southeast of Sunset Beach is Bolsa Chica State Beach. To the east is the bayfront community of Huntington Harbour (part of Huntington Beach), and roughly north is the Naval Weapons Station Seal Beach, and the Seal Beach National Wildlife Refuge. The small gated community of Surfside located between Sunset Beach and the Weapons Station is part of Seal Beach, with the rest of Seal Beach on the other side of the Weapons Station.

== Infrastructure ==
Sunset Beach does not have residential mail delivery. Instead, residents pick up their mail at post office boxes in the centrally located post office or at private post office boxes located on 22nd Street. The main Post Office features an award-winning wall mural designed and painted by local artist Katy Brack. Sunset Beach is served by the Sunset Beach Sanitary District and emergency services are provided by the Huntington Beach Police Department and the Huntington Beach Fire Department. Sunset Beach residents are civic minded and the town boasts three long-term associations - The Sunset Beach Community Association SBCA, The Sunset Beach Woman's Club and Las Damas, a woman's philanthropic organization.

== Notable people ==
- Mike Martt, singer-songwriter and member of Tex & the Horseheads and Thelonious Monster
- Bill Green, former United States and NCAA record holder in Track and Field, 5th place in the hammer throw at the 1984 Olympic Games

== See also ==
- Anaheim Bay
- Bolsa Chica State Beach
- Bolsa Chica Ecological Reserve
- Rancho La Bolsa Chica
- List of beaches in California
