= Bolsa Chica Ecological Reserve =

Natural public land in Orange County, California, US

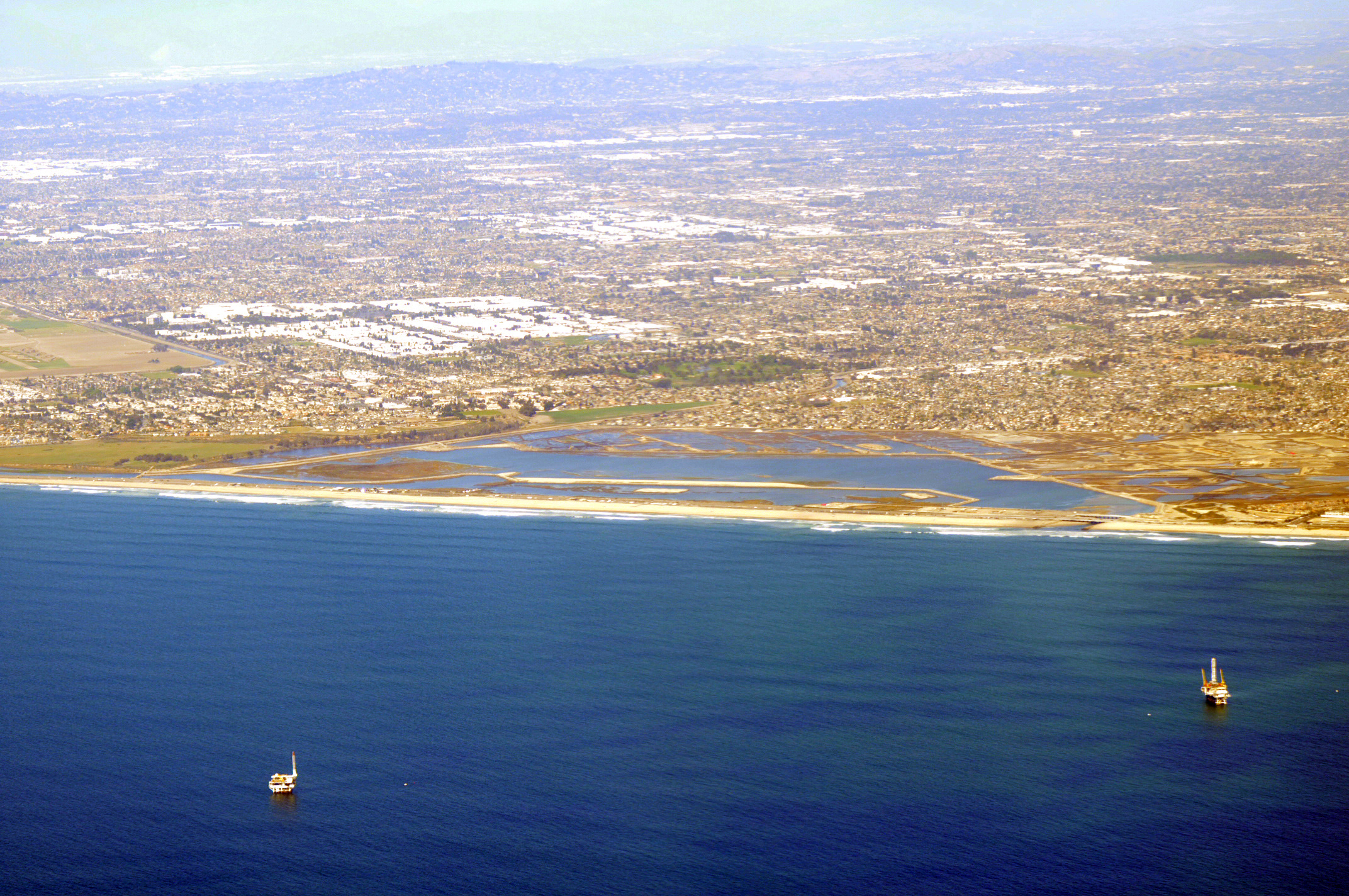
- Bolsa Chica Ecological Reserve and Bolsa Chica State Beach

- Location within the United States
- Location: California, United States
- Nearest city: Huntington Beach, California
- Coordinates: 33°41′59″N 118°02′20″W
- Area: Over 1,200 acres (4.9 km^{2})
- Established: 1979
- Governing body: California Department of Fish and Wildlife

Bolsa Chica State Ecological Reserve is a natural reserve and public land in Orange County, governed by the state of California, and immediately adjacent to the city of Huntington Beach, California. The reserve is designated by the California Department of Fish and Wildlife (CDFW) to protect a coastal wetland and upland, with both migratory and resident threatened and endangered species of wildlife and wildflowers.

The western boundary of the ecological reserve abuts two other state agency lands of State Route 1 (Pacific Coast Highway) managed by Cal Trans and California State Parks (Bolsa Chica State Beach).

The term bolsa chica means "little bag" in Spanish, as the area was part of a historic Mexican land grant named Rancho La Bolsa Chica. The reserve is also called many other names, including Bolsa Chica Lowlands, Bolsa Chica Wetlands, and Bolsa Chica Wildlife Refuge.

== History ==
The earliest peoples were the native Indians of California. Archaeologists have found cog stones as the site is believed to have been the home some 9,500 years ago for the Acjachemen and Tongva tribes. Speculation has centered on religious or astronomical use of the stones which have been included in collection of the Bowers Museum in Santa Ana.

Once Spain colonized California, Spanish officials created vast land grants called ranchos. One such grant, Rancho Los Nietos, was given to Manuel Nieto. After Nieto died, the grant was partitioned in 1834 into five Mexican ranchos including Rancho Las Bolsas. Rancho La Bolsa Chica was separated from Rancho Las Bolsas in 1841. The grant was later owned by Abel Stearns.

Prior to 1899, there had been a natural ocean entrance to the wetlands where the East Garden Grove Wintersburg Channel, then a small stream, is now located. In 1899, the Bolsa Chica Gun Club was formed by a group of wealthy businessmen from Los Angeles and Pasadena. The duck-hunting club catered to politicians and celebrities such as Babe Ruth and Lou Gehrig. They built a Craftsman-style two-story lodge on the lower mesa overlooking the marsh and Pacific Ocean. The Gun Club is responsible for damming off of Bolsa Chica from direct tidal flow with the ocean.

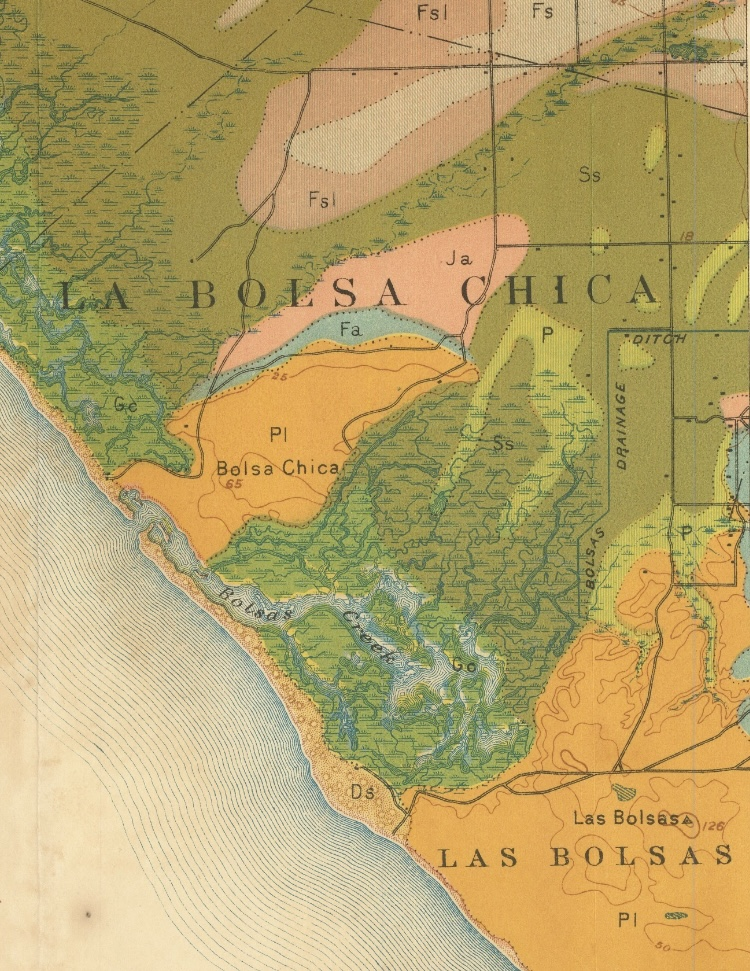
Waterways of the Bolsa Chica circa 1903

In July 1920, the Standard Oil Company entered a lease agreement with the Gun Club Board of Directors that would allow for them to begin oil extraction in between and around the Bolsa Wetlands. This contract specified that the initial bonus of $100,000 and subsequent revenues would be split 50/50 between the Bolsa Chica Gun Club and the Bolsa Chica Land Trust. Upon receipt of this money, it was then to be invested into "good, interest-bearing securities" (Board of Directors Meeting June 11, 1920).

In January 1921, in order to protect their newly acquired capital, the Gun Club assembled an investigative committee to complete a legal report that assessed the land title's specifics in respect to protection from outside parties encroaching upon their tide and marshlands for oil drilling. The organization also wished to inquire as to whether they should pursue a specific title that would clearly define their rights in regard to oil drilling.

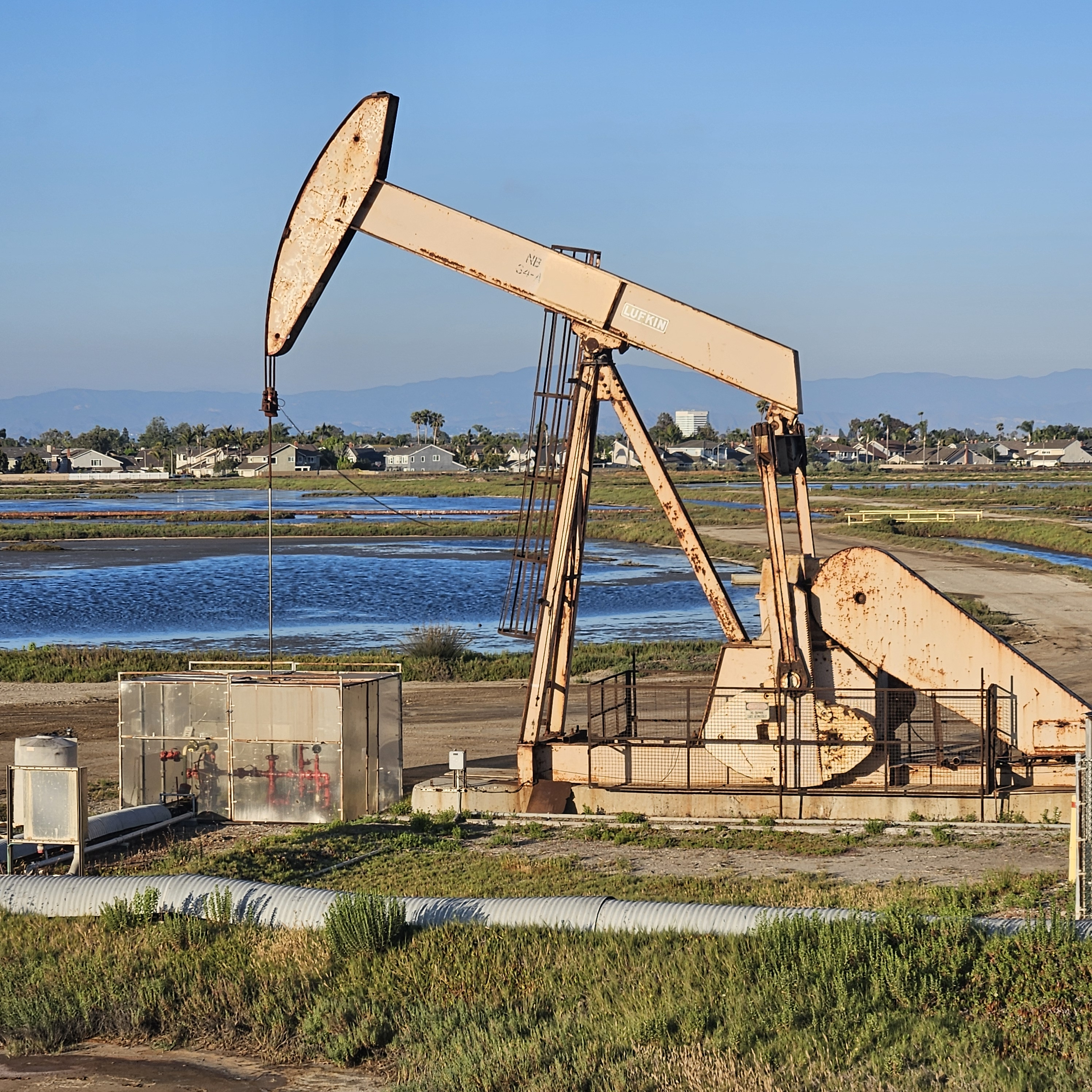
One of the many pumpjacks found in the reserve. They are currently operated by California Resource Corporation

In the 1940s, fears of a Japanese attack on California led to the construction of two bunkers at Bolsa Chica to defend the coastline. The larger bunker, Battery 128, was 96,866 square feet (8,999.1 m^{2}). The ceiling was constructed with 16 feet (4.9 m) of solid concrete capable of withstanding a direct hit from naval and air attacks. The bunker was built to accommodate naval guns capable of shooting 16-inch shells (410 mm). The smaller bunker, Battery 242, accommodated naval guns which shot 6-inch shells (150 mm) within a 16-mile radius (26 km). The Bolsa Chica Gun Club was used for worker's quarters during this time. Gun turrets were also mounted on the mesa, but were fired only for testing purposes. The larger of the two bunkers was demolished in 1995. The smaller support bunker still exists but is closed off from public access. All that is left of the turrets are their circular frame in the lowlands.

After the war, the Gun club reclaimed most of its land and resumed hunting activities.

Bolsa Chica Ecological Reserve is the site of two large concrete Panama-style mounts for Fort MacArthur's southernmost batteries.

In the 1960s, most of Bolsa Chica was acquired by Signal Landmark, and plans for a massive housing development and marina were released. State officials objected, and in 1970, the developer set aside 300 acres (1.2 km^{2}) alongside the Pacific Coast Highway to create the Bolsa Chica Ecological Reserve. The League of Women Voters and the American Association of University Women decided to create a new group in 1976 called Amigos de Bolsa Chica ("Friends of Bolsa Chica"), to advocate for the preservation of Bolsa Chica.

In 1990, the Amigos and the developer, now called Hearthside Homes, entered a joint agreement to create the Bolsa Chica Conservancy. The conservancy's mission is to educate the public about the importance of wetlands.

The size of Hearthside Homes' development decreased over the years. In 1992, the Bolsa Chica Land Trust was formed to expand the reserve beyond the wetlands. The upland habitat provided nesting, shelter, and food for egrets, herons, and raptors that also used the wetlands.

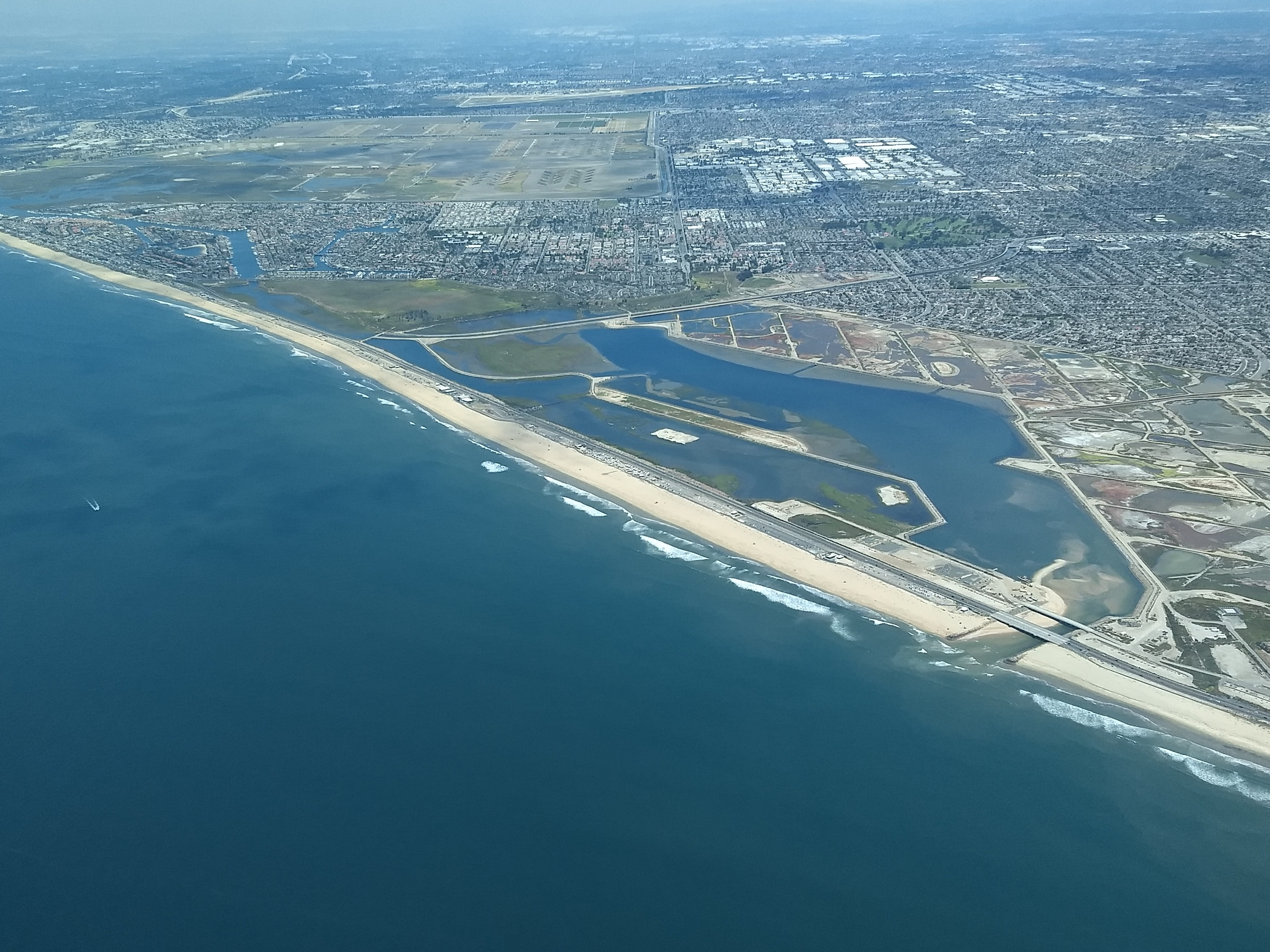
View of the reserve from offshore.

In 1997, the state of California purchased 880 acres (3.6 km^{2}) of Hearthside Homes' holdings. Restoration was completed in 2006 at a cost of $147 million which included opening an inlet to the Pacific Ocean, connecting it to the ocean for the first time since its damming in 1899.

In November 2000, the California Coastal Commission, which regulates development along the state's coastline, ruled that development had to be limited to the upper half ("upper bench") of the Bolsa Chica mesa because the lower half ("lower bench") was too valuable as habitat. Hearthside Homes sued, but the case was eventually dismissed. The developer contributed to the campaign of bond measure Proposition 50, which included specific language to purchase land at Bolsa Chica. Proposition 50 passed, and the state ended up purchasing 118 acres (0.48 km^{2}) of the lower bench, closing escrow in December 2005. Hearthside was free to develop the upper bench, and their 379-unit project (whittled down from the 5,000+ plan of the 1960s) broke ground in 2006.

An additional 56 acres (0.23 km^{2}) of uplands still remains in private ownership and is being considered for development. Hearings are ongoing with the California Coastal Commission.

In November 2018, the Bolsa Chica Land Trust raised $1,000,000 to secure the Ridge and Goodell properties, totaling 11.1 acres (0.045 km^{2}), which will be used to restore and preserve the land. In July 2023, the ownership of the Goodell property transferred to the Acjachemen Tongva Land Conservancy.

== Description ==
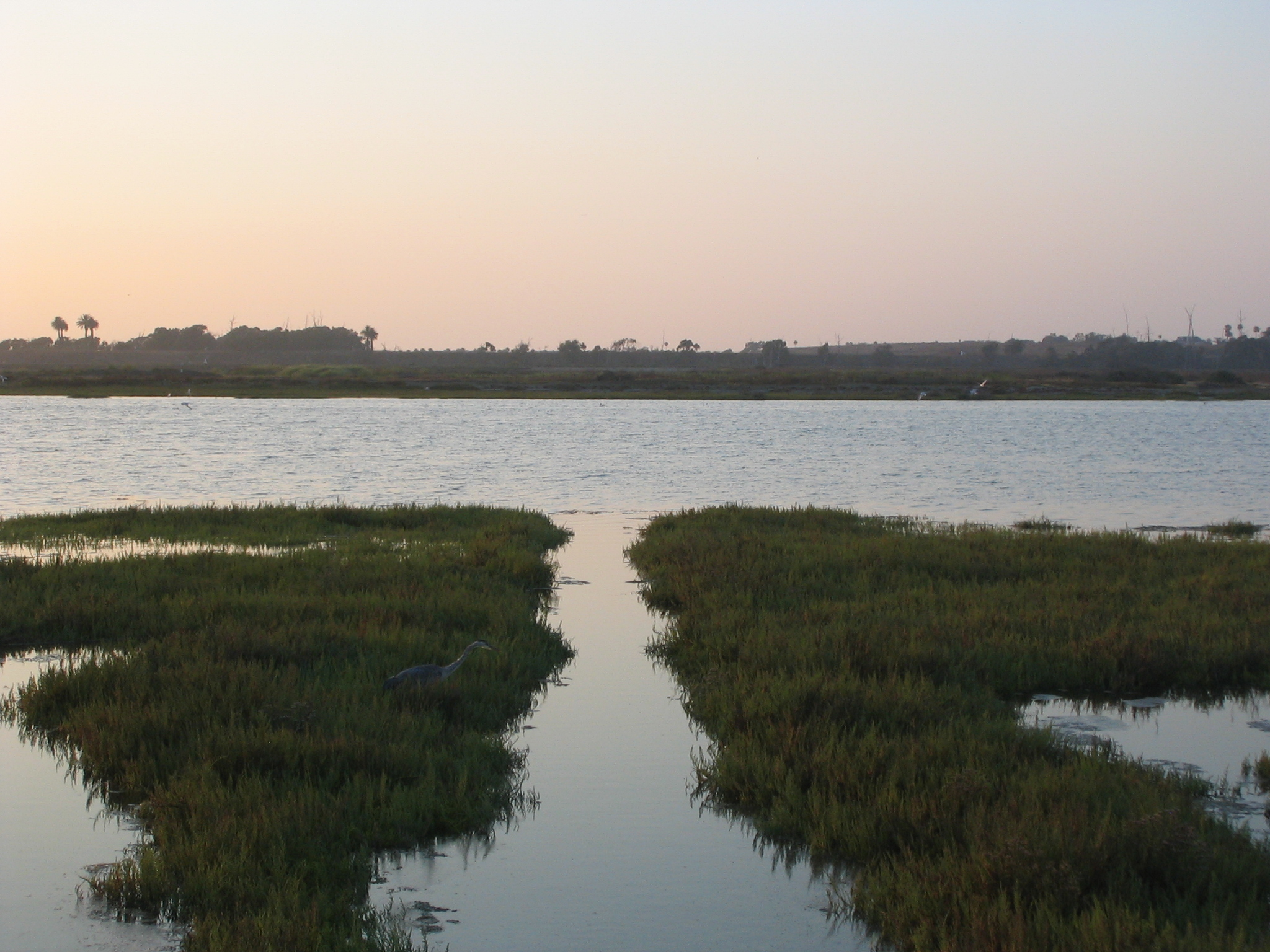
The tidal marsh and estuary of the wetlands

The Bolsa Chica Ecological Reserve boundaries are Warner Avenue to the north, Seapoint Avenue to the south, Pacific Coast Highway (PCH) to the west, and residential development to the east.

The East Garden Grove Wintersburg Channel runs through the Reserve. Beginning in December 2007, flood control improvements were made by the County of Orange to reinforce the levees damaged in the rains of 2005 and protect the wetlands. In addition, the Newport–Inglewood Fault goes through the reserve.

== Access ==
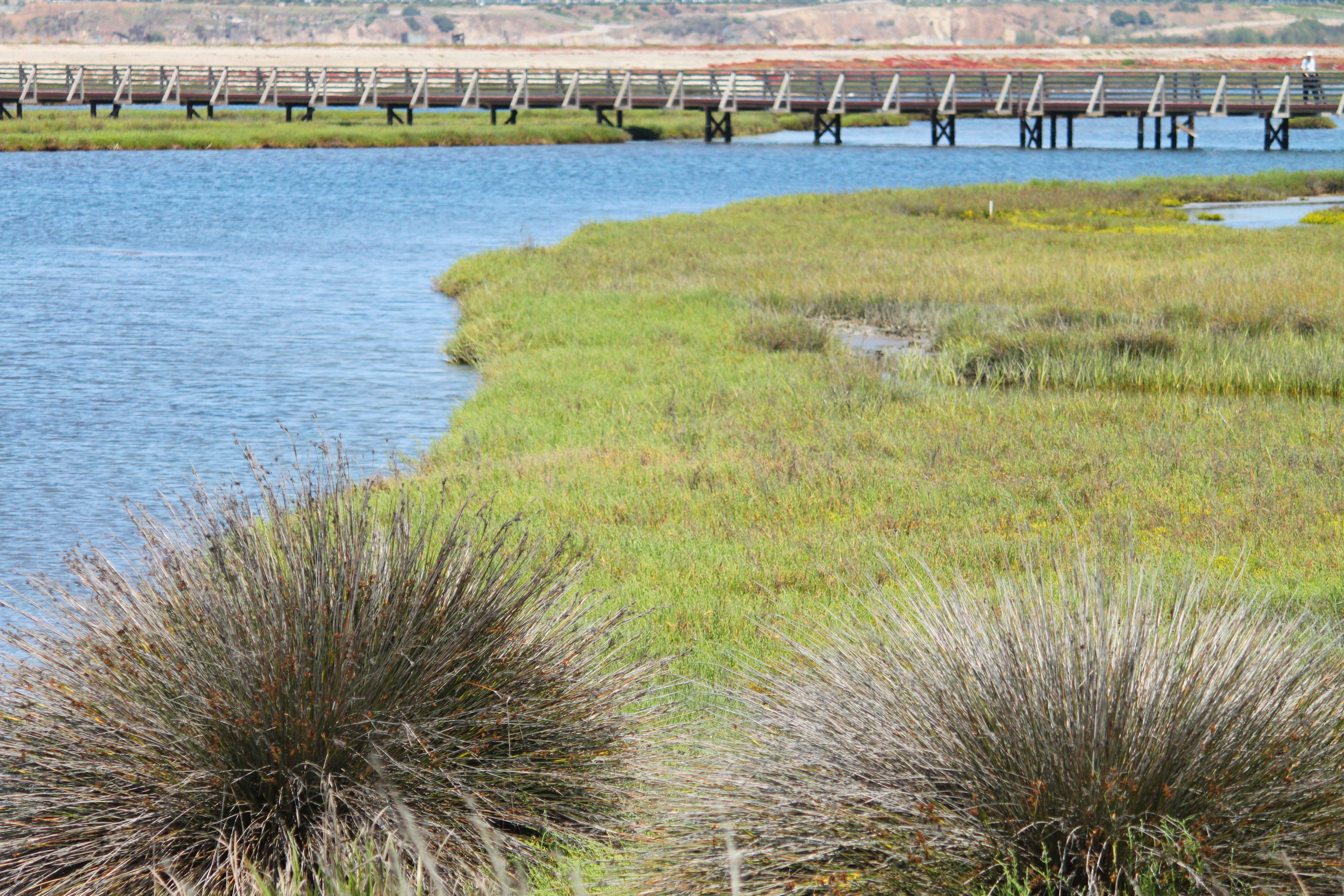
A southerly view toward the footbridge

There are two small parking lots: the north lot southeast of the intersection of Warner and PCH, and the south lot on PCH across from the entrance to Bolsa Chica State Beach. The north lot contains the Bolsa Chica Interpretive Center. It is the starting point for the Mesa Trail, which leads to the overlook and rest stop at Mesa Point. The south lot is the starting point for the 1.5-mile (2.4 km) Loop Trail, which crosses a wooden bridge, passes two overlooks, and returns to the parking lot via a sand-dune trail paralleling PCH.

Approximately 30,000 people visit the reserve each year. Hiking, photography, and birdwatching are popular activities at the reserve.

There are special regulations in force for the Bolsa Chica Ecological Reserve:

- Fishing shall be permitted at designated areas around outer Bolsa Bay only.
- Pets are prohibited from entering the reserve except when they remain inside a motor vehicle.

=== Interpretive Center ===
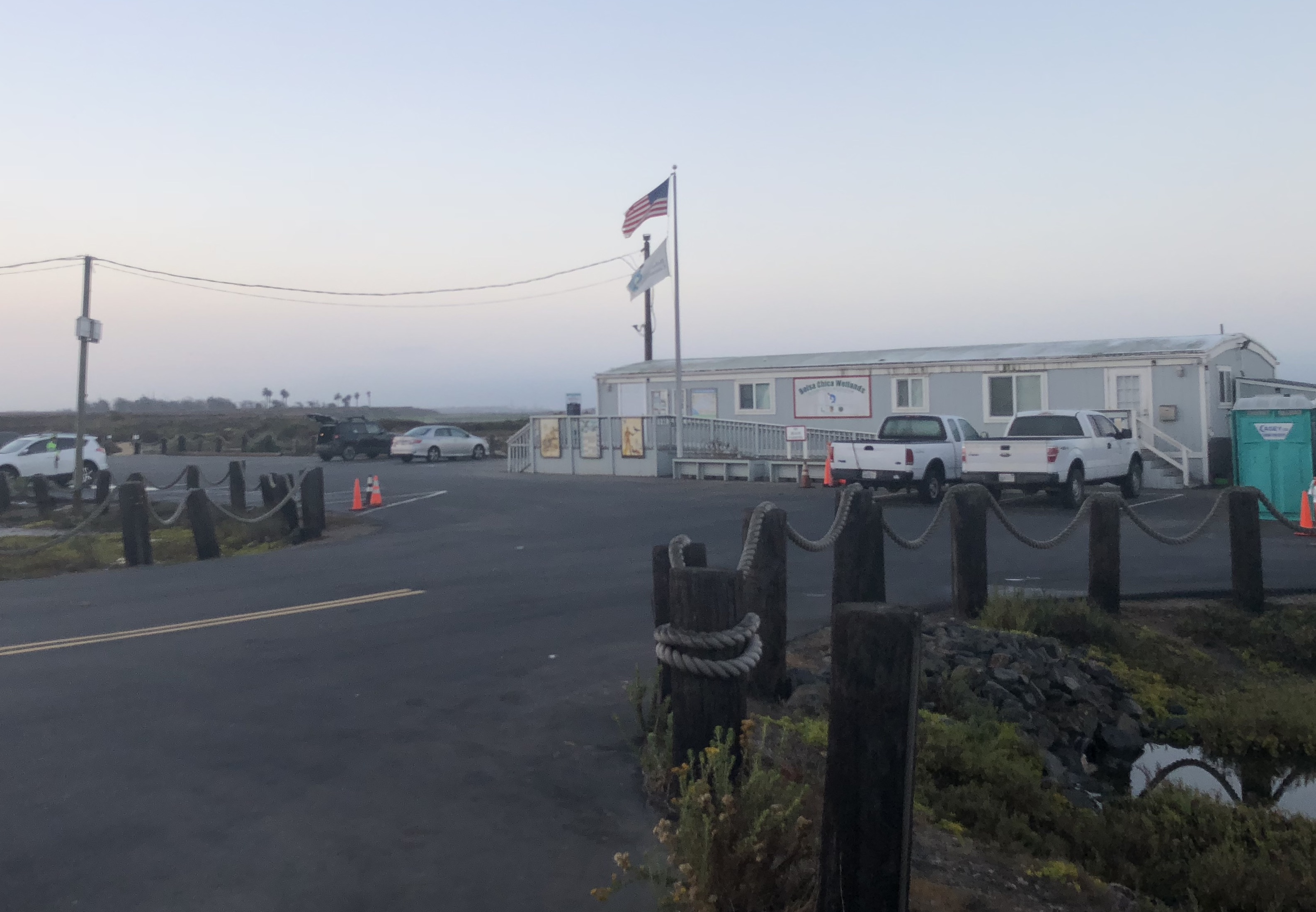
The Bolsa Chica Interpretive Center is located in the North Parking Lot of the reserve.

The Bolsa Chica Conservancy Interpretive Center offers live animal exhibits, aquaria, maps and information about Bolsa Chica and education programs on wetland science. The main room's exhibits include live marine life species native to Bolsa Chica and the southern California coast, including bat stars, ochre stars, giant-spined stars, warty sea cucumbers, Kellet's whelks, chestnut cowries, striped shore crabs, and California spiny lobster. A second exhibit room includes live reptiles such as California kingsnakes, San Diego gopher snake, coastal rosy boa, two-striped garter snakes, and alligator lizards. Throughout the center there are many examples of taxidermy including opossums, snakes and birds such as the great blue heron, California brown pelican, Cooper's hawk, red-shouldered hawk, and Anna's hummingbird.

=== Tours ===
Free public tours are offered each month by three organizations: the Amigos de Bolsa Chica, the Bolsa Chica Conservancy, and the Bolsa Chica Land Trust.

=== Amigos de Bolsa Chica ===
The Amigos offer a number of programs to advocate the preservation, restoration, and maintenance of Bolsa Chica, emphasizing longstanding advocacy, community awareness efforts, and ongoing restoration. Some of the Amigos' most popular community-based programs include:

- Education and Research: In addition to private and public docent-led walking tours, a docent training program, and multiple education-based book publications on the Bolsa Chica, the Amigos' FLOW Program ("Follow and Learn about the Ocean and Wetland") offers members of the community an opportunity to learn more about coastal ecology and get involved in environmental quality monitoring efforts. Community members meet every Friday to collect and analyze water samples in part of a regional monitoring network. Data is sent to the California Department of Public Health, which maintains the state of California's Phytoplankton Monitoring Program.
- Sustainable Restoration and Stewardship: For over 40 years, the Amigos have worked to preserve and maintain the Bolsa Chica Ecological Reserve. Community members have the opportunity to train to become a docent or citizen scientist, participate in monthly clean-ups of the wetlands, teach water quality classes to visiting students, and sit on a committee led by the board of directors.

=== Bolsa Chica Conservancy ===
Bolsa Chica Conservancy hosts numerous after school and volunteer programs to encourage ecological participation, awareness and environmental action. In addition to community-building leadership and education programs, The Bolsa Chica Conservancy focuses its non-profit efforts on research and restoration:

- Research: In addition to consistent water quality testing, the conservancy encourages research by way of volunteer birders, who fill out bird sighting surveys for local population data. In order to focus on this research specifically with the endangered California least tern and the threatened western snowy plover, The Eyes on Nest Sites (EONS) project was launched in 2010.
- Restoration:Trash cleanup and environment restoration are important components in Bolsa Chica's volunteering opportunities. In fact, Public Service Day is hosted on the last Saturday and second Sunday of every month; it typically includes trash removal, the planting of native plants, and invasive plant removal, all of which contribute to the health of these increasingly rare coastal wetland habitats.

=== Bolsa Chica Land Trust ===
The Bolsa Chica Land Trust offers education and volunteer programs which encourage hands-on involvement with the Bolsa Chica Ecological Reserve. Highlights of their community programming include:

- Stewards Restoration Project: The Stewards and Junior Stewards Programs, in collaboration with the California Department of Fish and Wildlife, are dedicated to the complete restoration of the Bolsa Chica Ecological Reserve's natural habitat. They meet bimonthly to reintroduce native species, remove of non-native species, and pick-up trash.
- Miracles of the Marsh: The Land Trust's Miracles of the Marsh is an elementary school education program which offers students a walking docent-led tour of the Bolsa Chica. The program includes a field guide for teachers and a presentation prior to visiting.

== Wildlife ==
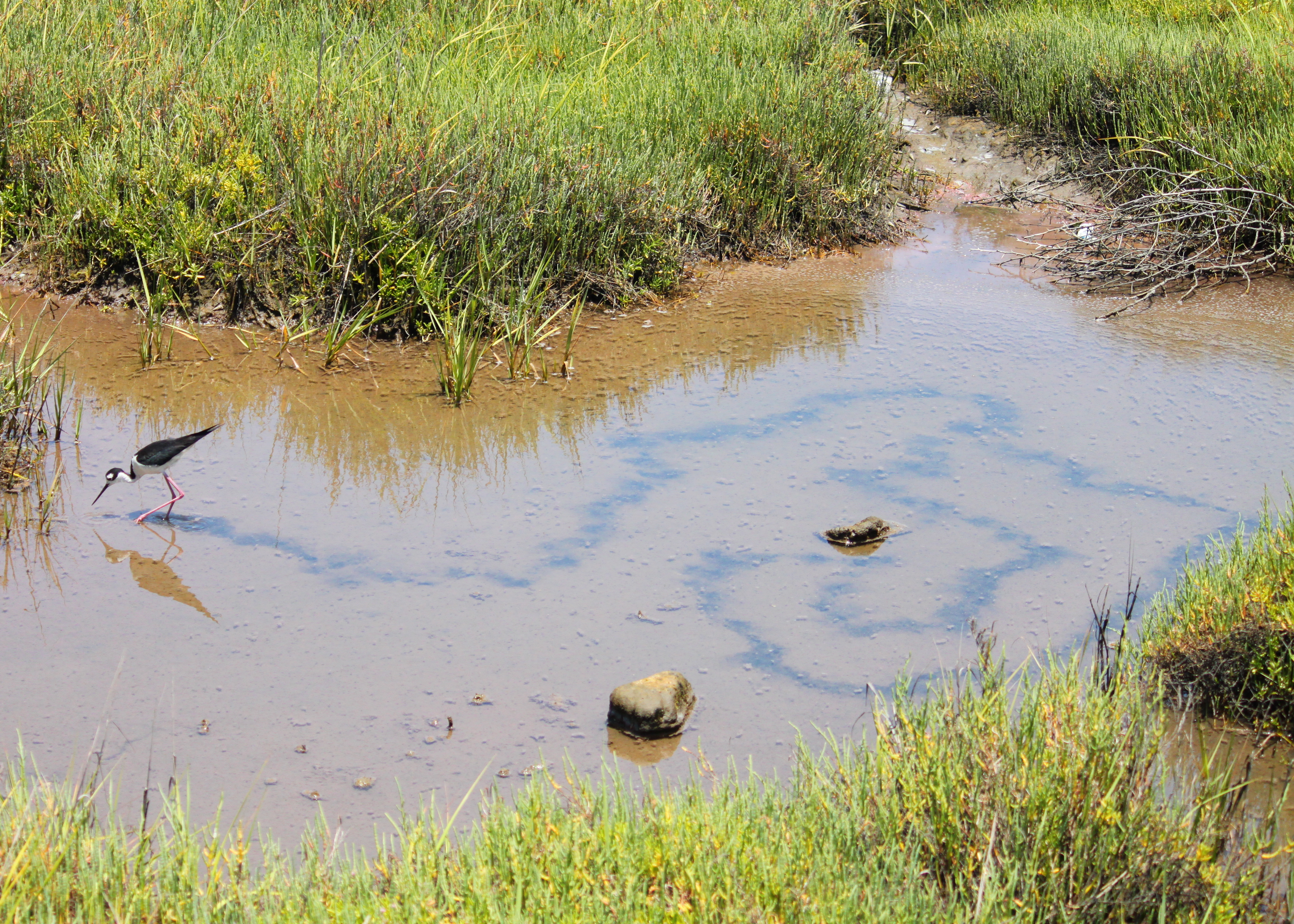
The black-necked stilt is one of the Reserve's seasonal occupants.

Among the wildlife in the reserve are the shovelnose guitarfish, grey smooth-hound sharks, California halibut, and white seabass. There are also snakes in the grassy areas of the wetlands, ranging from harmless kingsnakes and gopher snakes in various colors to rattlesnakes, including western diamondbacks and Pacific rattlesnakes. Other wildlife include western fence lizard, cottontail rabbit, Beechey ground squirrel, and coyotes. Green sea turtles are also known to visit the wetlands occasionally.

In spring and fall, the reserve is home to many migratory birds. As many as 321 out of Orange County's 420 bird species have been sighted at the reserve in the past decade. Bird species at the reserve include the endangered light-footed rail, snowy plover, Savannah sparrow, least tern, Caspian tern, great blue heron, snowy egret, double-crested cormorant, red-tailed hawk, great horned owl, and California gnatcatcher.

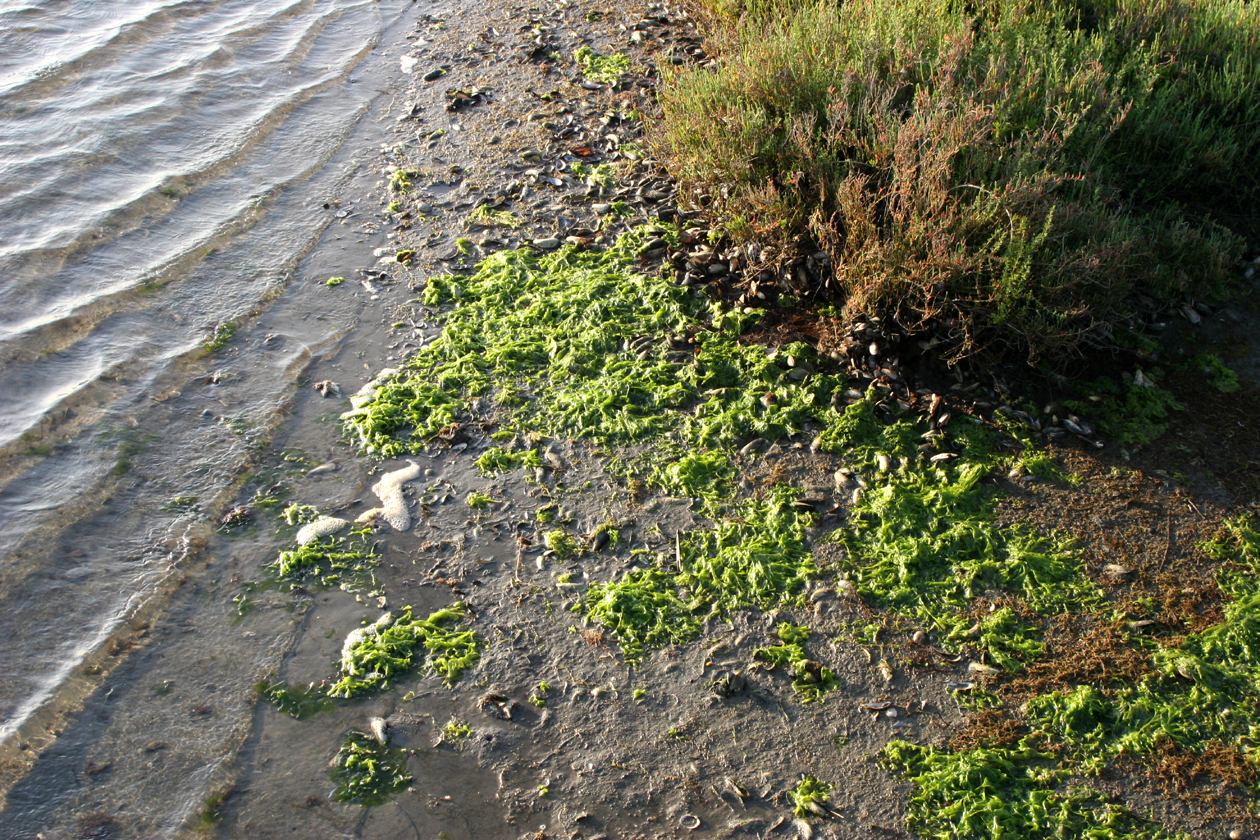
Sea lettuce (Ulva sp.) grows in the wetland water predominately during springtime.

== See also ==
- Bolsa Chica Basin State Marine Conservation Area
- Bolsa Chica State Beach
