= Lunenburg (CDP), Massachusetts =

Lunenburg, Massachusetts
- CDP
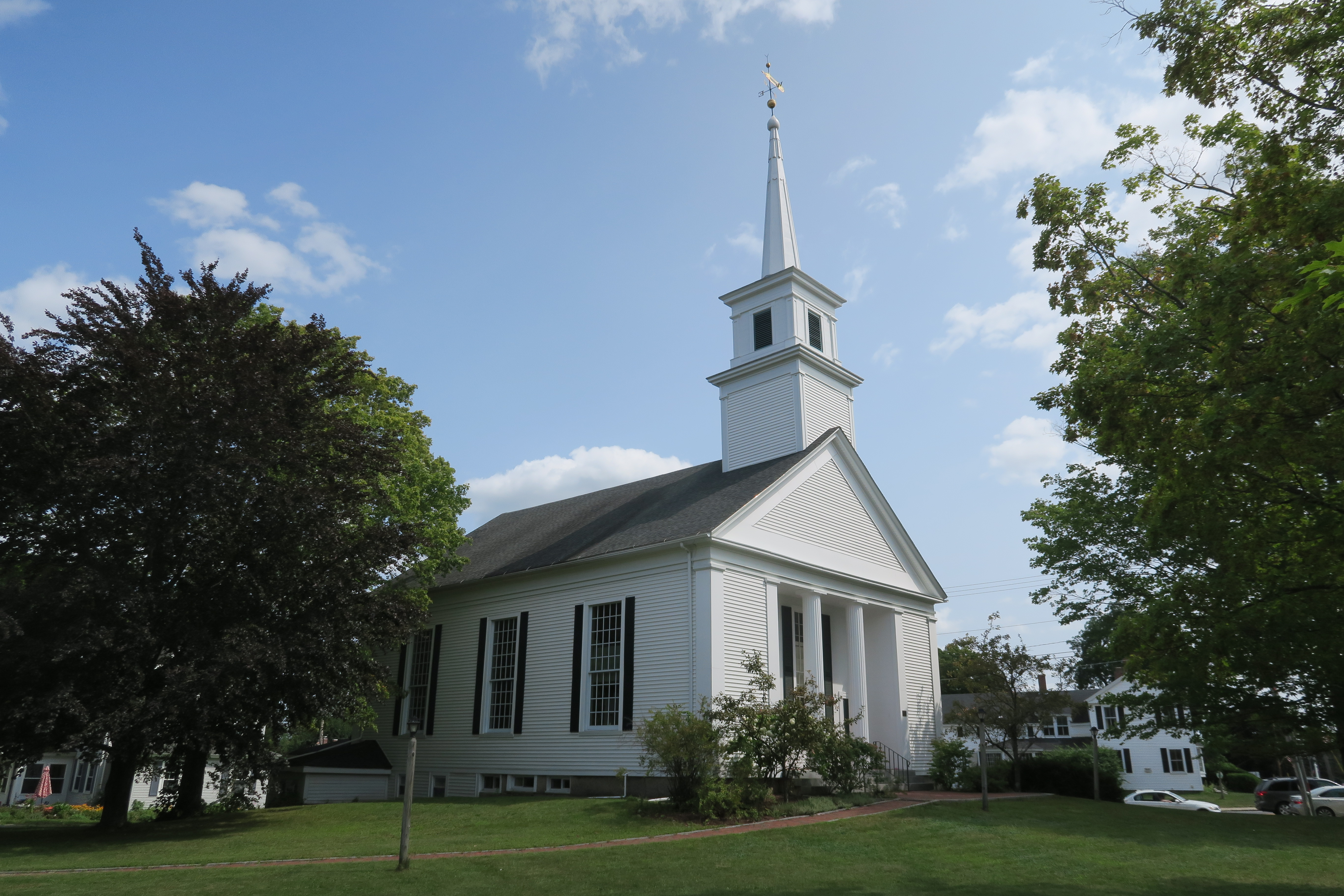
- United Parish of Lunenburg

- Location in Worcester County and the state of Massachusetts.
- Coordinates: 42°35′42″N 71°43′29″W
- Country: United States
- State: Massachusetts
- County: Worcester

Area
  - Total: 3.80 sq mi (9.84 km^{2})
  - Land: 3.80 sq mi (9.84 km^{2})
  - Water: 0 sq mi (0.00 km^{2})
- Elevation: 571 ft (174 m)

Population (2020)
  - Total: 1,789
  - Density: 471/sq mi (181.9/km^{2})
- Time zone: UTC-5 (Eastern (EST))
  - Summer (DST): UTC-4 (EDT)
- ZIP code: 01462
- Area code: 978
- FIPS code: 25-37385
- GNIS feature ID: 0610772

Lunenburg is a census-designated place (CDP) in the town of Lunenburg in Worcester County, Massachusetts, United States. The population was 1,760 at the 2010 census.

== Geography ==
Lunenburg is located at 42°35′42″N 71°43′28″W (42.595056, -71.724654).

According to the United States Census Bureau, the CDP has a total area of 9.9 km^{2} (3.8 sq mi), all land.

== Demographics ==
Historical population
Census	Pop.	Note	%±
2020	1,789		—
U.S. Decennial Census

As of the census of 2000, there were 1,695 people, 632 households, and 489 families residing in the CDP. The population density was 171.3 people/km^{2} (444 people/mi^{2}). There were 644 housing units at an average density of 65.1 units/km^{2} (169 units/mi^{2}). The racial makeup of the CDP was 96.81% White, 0.35% Black or African American, 0.24% Native American, 1.06% Asian, 0.12% from other races, and 1.42% from two or more races. Hispanic or Latino of any race were 1.06% of the population.

There were 632 households, out of which 35.3% had children under the age of 18 living with them, 66.5% were married couples living together, 8.9% had a female householder with no husband present, and 22.5% were non-families. 19.1% of all households were made up of individuals, and 10.0% had someone living alone who was 65 years of age or older. The average household size was 2.68 and the average family size was 3.06.

In the CDP, the population was spread out, with 26.3% under the age of 18, 5.4% from 18 to 24, 26.1% from 25 to 44, 27.3% from 45 to 64, and 15.0% who were 65 years of age or older. The median age was 41 years. For every 100 females, there were 96.9 males. For every 100 females age 18 and over, there were 95.5 males.

The median income for a household in the CDP was $54,429, and the median income for a family was $58,203. Males had a median income of $52,026 versus $32,139 for females. The per capita income for the CDP was $31,759. About 1.9% of families and 0.8% of the population were below the poverty line, including 1.0% of those under age 18 and none of those age 65 or over.
