= Rancho Los Coyotes =

Mexican land grant in California

- Mexican land grant
- Interactive map of Rancho Los Coyotes
- Coordinates: 33.800°N 117.990°W
- Country: Mexico (1834–1848) / United States (after 1848)
- State: California
- Granted: 1834
- Founder: Juan José Nieto

Area
  - Total: 76.26 sq mi (197.51 km^{2})

Rancho Los Coyotes was a 48,806-acre (197.51 km^{2}) 1834 Mexican land grant resulting from the partition of the Rancho Los Nietos grant, in present-day southeastern Los Angeles County and northwestern Orange County, California. The rancho lands include the present-day cities of Cerritos, La Mirada, Artesia, Stanton, and Buena Park.

== History ==
At the request of Manuel Nieto's heirs, Governor José Figueroa in 1834 officially declared the 167,000-acre (680 km^{2}) Rancho Los Nietos grant under Mexican rule and ordered its partition into five smaller ranchos: Las Bolsas, Los Alamitos, Los Cerritos, Los Coyotes, and Santa Gertrudes. Juan José Nieto (eldest son of Manuel Nieto) received Los Coyotes. In 1840, Juan José Nieto sold Rancho Los Coyotes to Juan Bautista Leandry, an Italian immigrant who settled in California in 1827 and was married to Maria Francisca Uribe, who renamed it "La Buena Esperanza," – The Good Hope – but it was still generally known as Los Coyotes.

Leandry died in 1842, and his widow, Maria Francisca Uribe, married Francisco O'Campo.

With the cession of California to the United States following the Mexican–American War, the 1848 Treaty of Guadalupe Hidalgo provided that the land grants would be honored. As required by the Land Act of 1851, a claim for Rancho Los Coyotes was filed with the Public Land Commission in 1852, and the grant was patented to Andrés Pico and Francisca Uribe de O'Campo in 1875.

== Historic sites of the Rancho ==
- Bacon House (circa 1884). Originally built by an unknown squatter in a remote area of Rancho Los Coyotes and eventually ended up as a residence for Robert D. Bacon, a turn-of-the-century Buena Park farmer.

== See also ==
- Ranchos of Orange County
- Ranchos of Los Angeles County
