= Leonardo Cota =

American politician

Leonardo Cota (1816–1887) was a Captain with the Californios in the Mexican–American War; and later a Los Angeles County Supervisor.

Leonardo Cota (1816–1887) was born during the Mexican War of Independence in Mexico, the son of Guillermo Cota. Leonardo Cota married Maria Rosa Yorba, daughter of Californio Rancho Cañón de Santa Ana owner Bernardo Yorba. At the time of the Placerita Canyon gold discovery of 1842, Cota was a clerk-registrar at Pueblo de Los Angeles, under the services of his cousin, Governor Pio Pico, who would be known as the last governor of Alta California under Mexican rule. During this time, Pio Pico speculated on the success of the gold strike, and made Pueblo de Los Angeles, the regional capital of Alta-California.

At the start of the Mexican–American War, Leonardo Cota enlisted with the Californios, along with his cousin, Andrés Pico, the brother of Governor Pico. Together, both would reach the rank of captain, but due to the influence of Pico's brother, Andres would be raised to the rank of General in charge of the Californios. Being good with weapons on horseback, Cota would command the Californio Lancers. In the many battles he participated in Alta-California, Cota would be remembered for his role at The Battle of San Pasqual, where he and his men were discovered in the San Pasqual Valley by a small group of U.S. Army soldiers. When the soldiers of General Stephen Watts Kearny came into the valley to engage Cota and his men, they were routed by "Capitan Cota's Lancers". With the additional quick response of General Pico's army, they forced Kearny and his men toward what is today called Mule Hill, where a standoff ensued. Several days later, Pico's army withdrew in response to U.S. Army re-enforcements from San Diego.

After the Mexican–American War, and the California Republic becoming part of the United States, Leonardo Cota acquired additional land in California, and continued to play a prominent position in Pueblo de Los Angeles. Cota became one of the early Los Angeles County Supervisors in 1853. Leonardo Cota would later retire to his adobe homestead in what is today the city of Covina, California. In 1850, he would be one of the founders of the city of Santa Ana, California in Orange County. He died in Southern California in 1887.

== Guillermo Cota ==
Juan Ignacio Guillermo Cota (1768–1844) was born in Loreto, Baja California. He was the son and nephew of Pueblo Los Angeles escorto soldier-founders, Roque and Antonio Cota. Guillermo Cota was a comisionado of Pueblo de Los Angeles, and mayor of Los Angeles. He had four children by his first marriage in 1794 to Maria Manuela Elizalde (1777–1803). After her death, Guillermo Cota married Maria Manuela Nieto (1788–1832) who inherited Rancho Los Cerritos at the death of her father, Manuel Nieto, in 1804. They had twelve children including Francisco Cota, Leonardo Cota, and Maria Engracia Cota-Dominguez (see:Manuel Dominguez).

== Francisco Cota ==
Francisco Cota (1825–1906) was born in Spanish Colonial Mexico, the son of Guillermo Cota, and brother of Leonardo Cota, Maria Engracia Cota-Dominguez. Cota married Martina Madelena Machado, daughter of californio (Mexican) Rancho La Ballona owner Jose Agustin Antonio Machado.
