= Huntington Harbour, Huntington Beach, California =

Community in Orange County, California, US

Coordinates: 33.7215°N 118.0648°W

Huntington Harbour is a community of about 3,500 people located in the northwestern section of Huntington Beach in Orange County, California. Huntington Harbour is a residential development of 680 acres (280 ha) which includes five man-made islands with waterways varying from 15 to 20 feet (4.6 to 6.1 m) in depth used for boating. The five islands in Huntington Harbour include: Admiralty, Davenport, Gilbert, Humboldt, and Trinidad.

== History ==
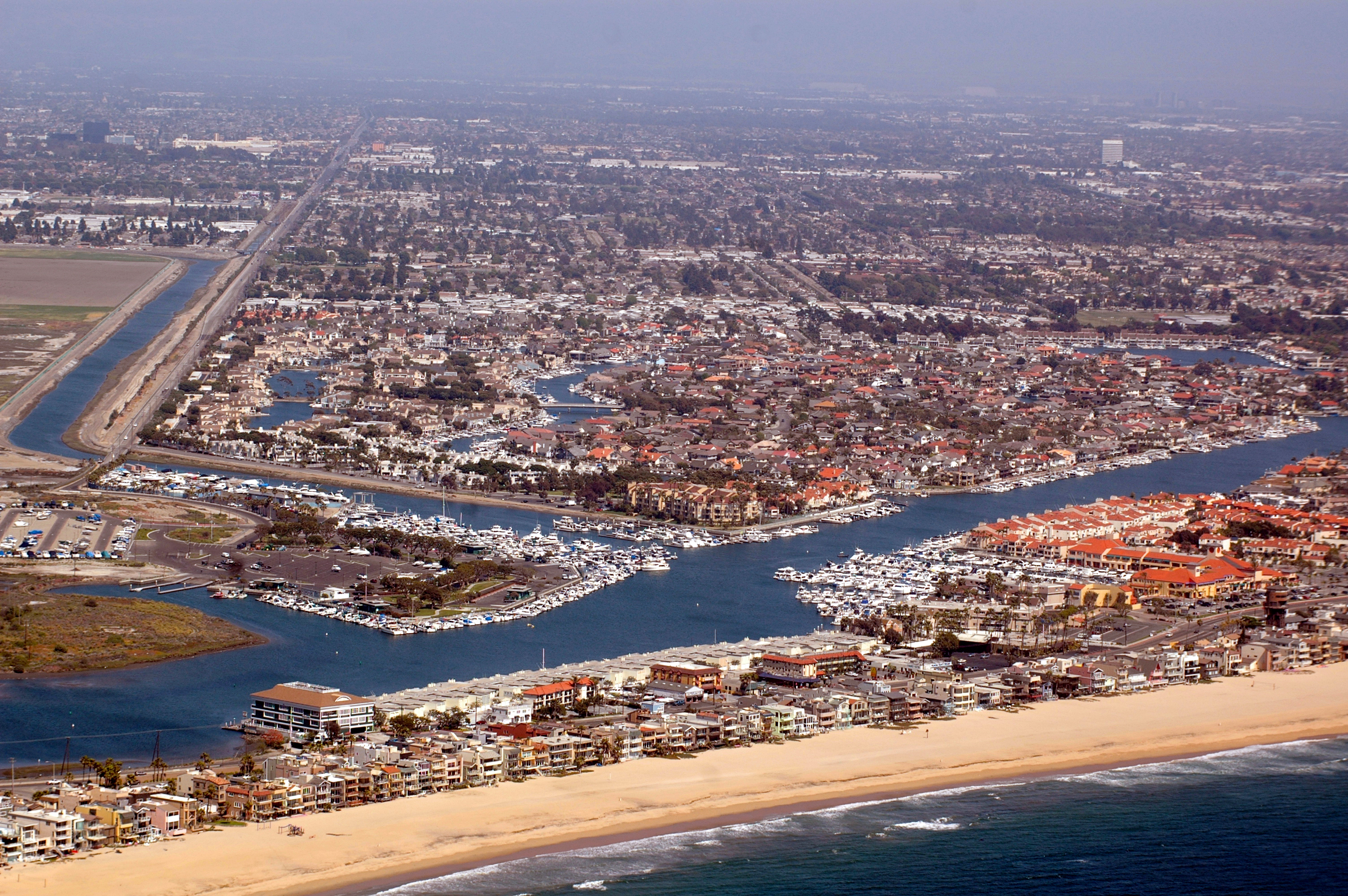
Huntington Harbour from the air with Sunset Beach in foreground.

Huntington Harbour construction began in 1963 at a cost of $200 million. The harbors and peninsulas are located on the former site of the historic Sunset Bay Estuary wetlands. They were destroyed with dredging and filling to develop the land for the new community.

Huntington Harbour is bracketed to the south by the 1,200 acres (4.9 km^{2}) Bolsa Chica Ecological Reserve and to the north by the 5,256 acres (21.27 km^{2}) Naval Weapons Station Seal Beach.

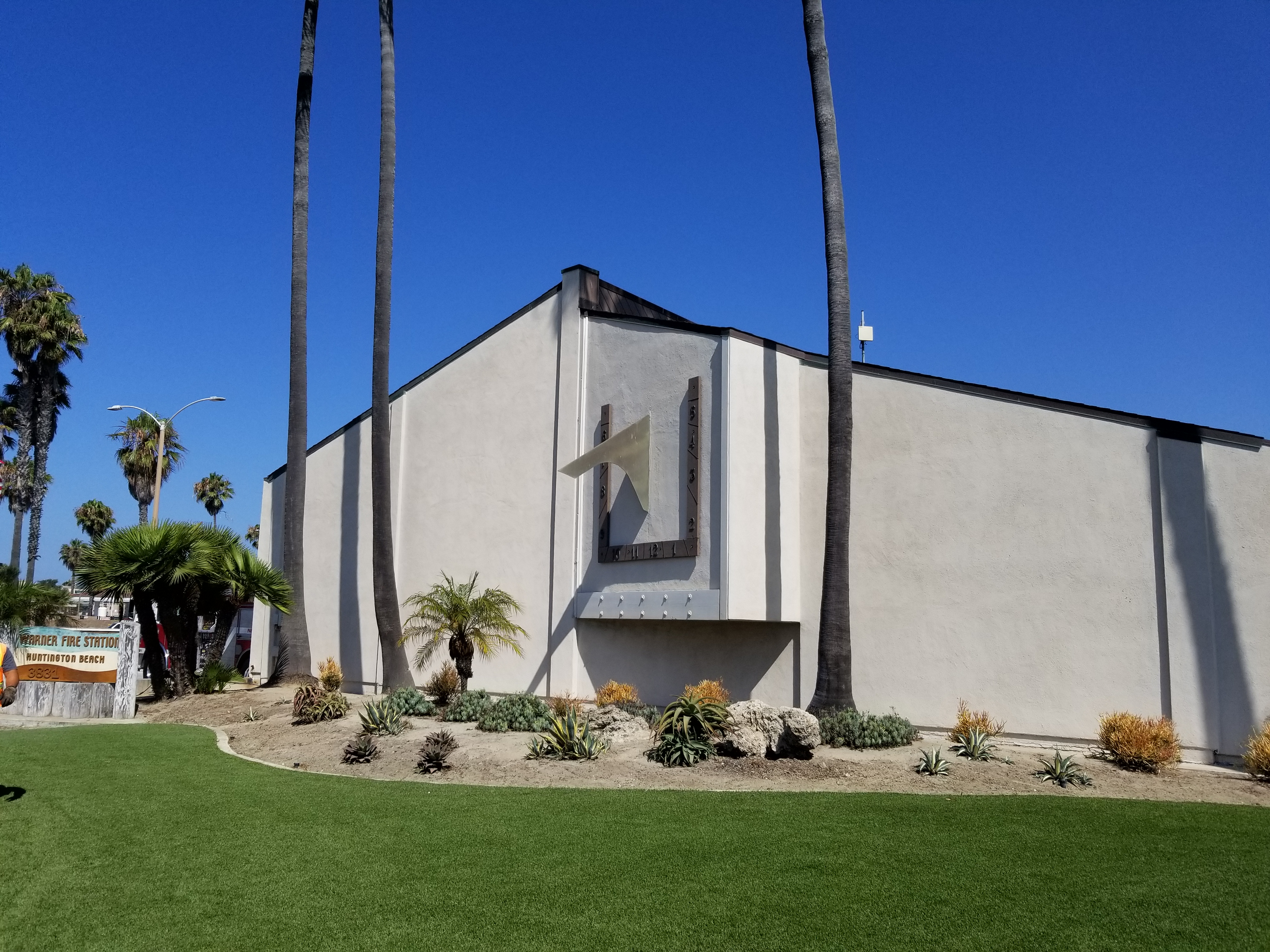
Warner Fire Station, located next to the Harbour Yacht club, and its prominent sundial

The Huntington Harbour Yacht Club, with membership of about 300 people, was established in 1965. The club offers sailing lessons during the summer for disadvantaged youth.

== Islands ==
Admiralty Island: This development contains 90 single-family residences, nearly all with water frontage.

Davenport Island: 227 home sites are evenly split between on-water and off-water locations.

Gilbert Island: Bounded by Admiralty Island to the west and the Main Channel to the east, it contains 100 home sites, two thirds of which are on-the-water locations.

Humboldt Island: Two-thirds of the 335 homes are on-water locations with views of Christiana Bay.

Trinidad Island: This is considered the most luxurious of the islands.

== Arts and culture ==
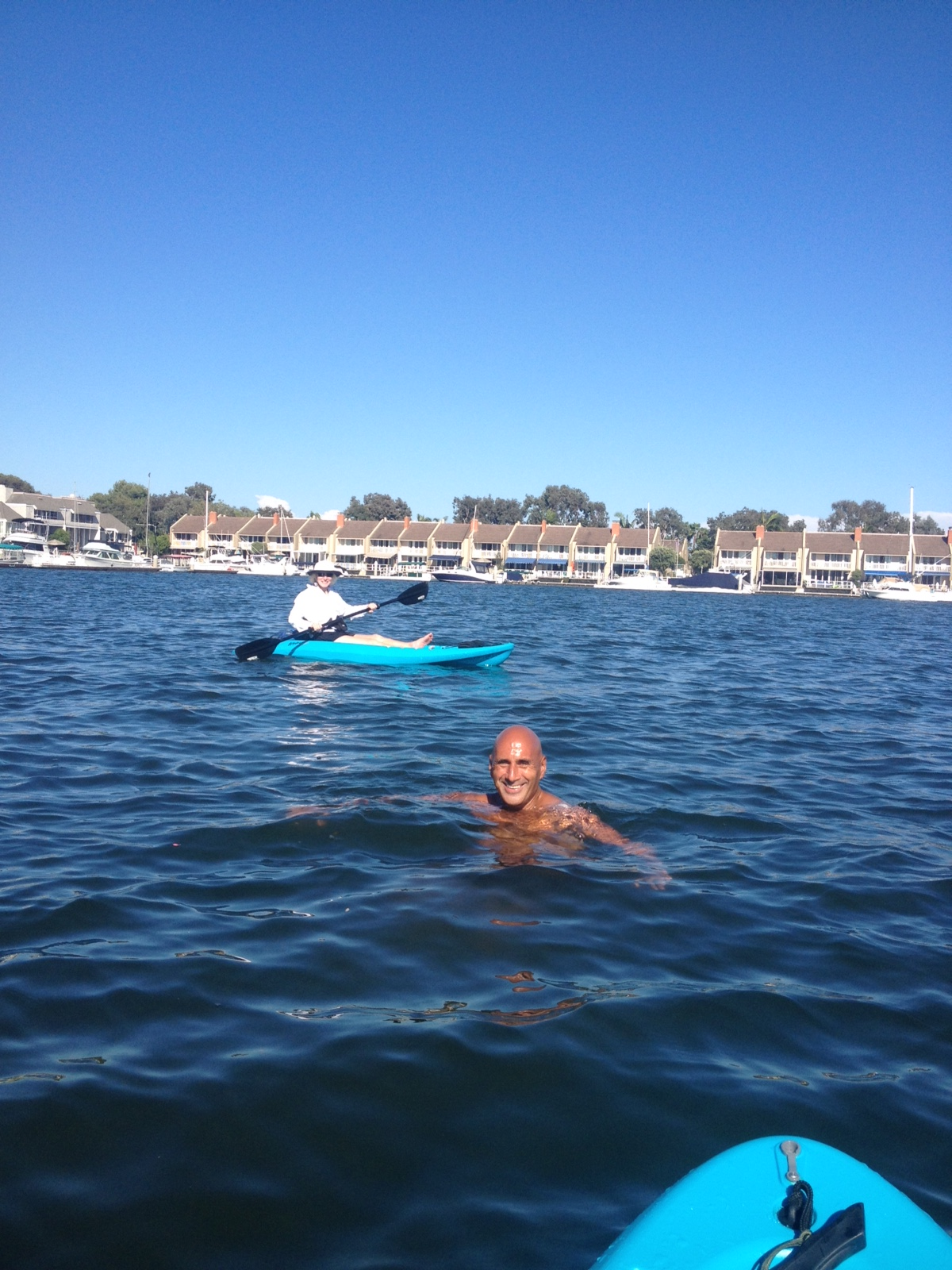
Huntington Harbour kayakers

There are five "Mother's beaches" in Huntington Harbour where local families bring their children to play in the sand and swim in the shallow water by shore. Kayakers and paddle boarders also use these beaches as access points to the harbour as well as swimmers who can enjoy long-distance swims undisturbed by waves and currents. Because of the relative shallowness of Huntington Harbour, 15–20 feet (4.6–6.1 m) when compared to the ocean, the harbor is generally three to four degrees warmer than the ocean in summer and, conversely, three to four degrees cooler in winter. Boat traffic is limited to 5 mph (8.0 km/h) no wake. The harbour is patrolled by the Orange County Sheriff's Department Huntington Harbour Patrol and Huntington Beach Marine Fire Rescue.

During December, a boat parade takes place through the waterways. Also during this time the "Cruise of Lights" occurs in which tour boats go around the channels viewing the decorated homes as a fundraiser.

== Economy ==
The majority of the homes were originally built in the 1960s to late 1970s and feature three to six bedrooms that range from 2,090 to 6,739 square feet of living space. Although Huntington Harbour is primarily residential, with most homes varying from one to ten million dollars, there is a shopping center on Algonquin Street called the Huntington Harbour Mall.
