= Bolsa Chica State Beach =

Beach in Orange County, California

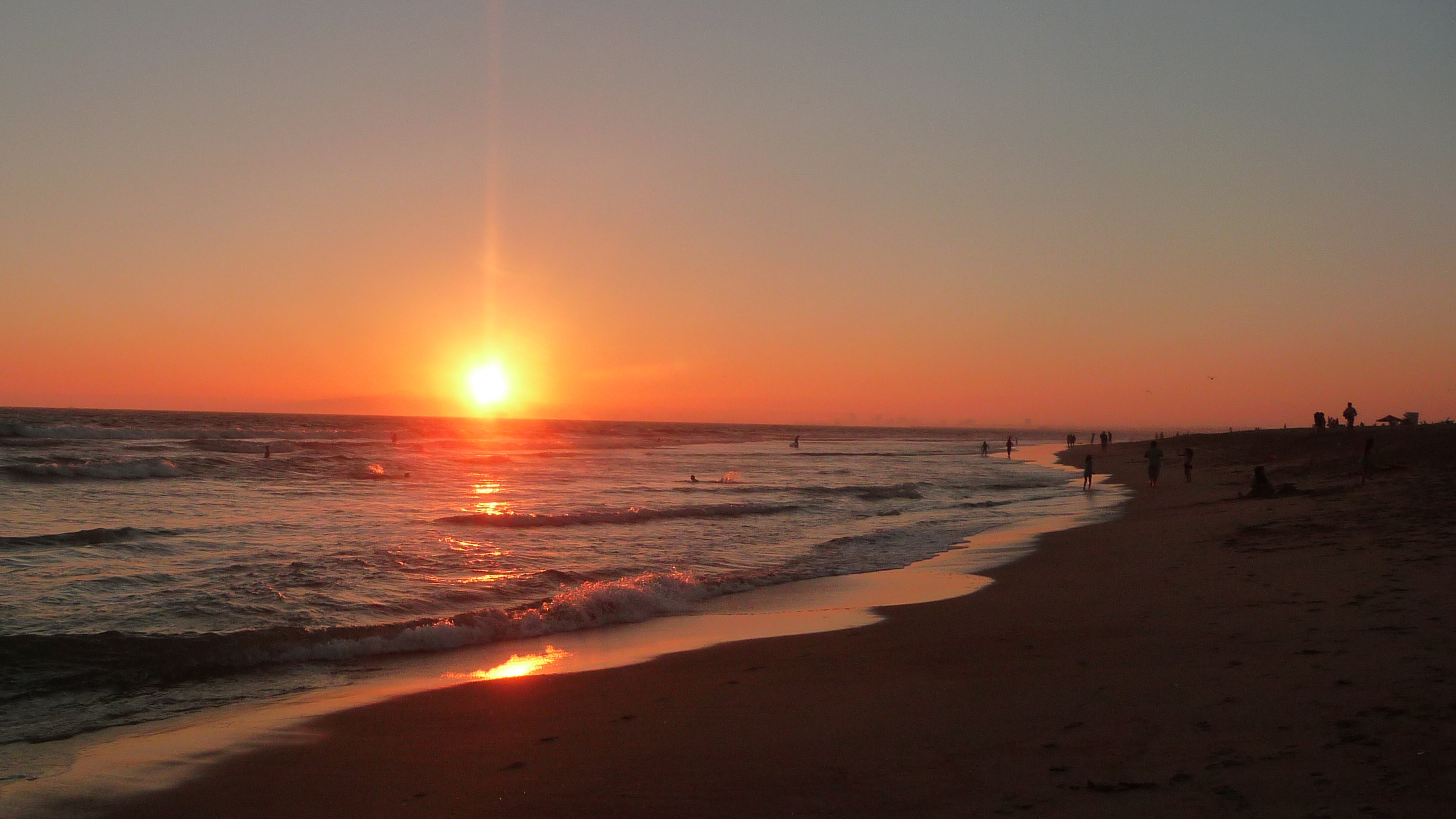

- Location within California Location within the United States
- Location: Orange County, California, United States
- Nearest city: Huntington Beach, California
- Coordinates: 33°41′44″N 118°2′56″W
- Area: 169 acres (68 ha)
- Established: 1960
- Governing body: California Department of Parks and Recreation

Bolsa Chica State Beach is a public ocean beach in Orange County, California, United States. It is surrounded entirely by the city of Huntington Beach to the north and east, and to the northwest by the Huntington Beach community of Sunset Beach and the Pacific Ocean to the west. The beach extends 3 miles (5 km) from Warner Avenue in Sunset Beach south to Seapoint Avenue, where the Huntington City Beach begins. The Bolsa Chica Ecological Reserve is located across Pacific Coast Highway (PCH) from the beach and is a popular spot for birdwatching. The Bolsa Chica Bicycle Path runs along the length of the park through Huntington City Beach.

Activities include surfing, sunbathing, water sports and fishing. Tent camping is not allowed at Bolsa Chica State Beach. Fire rings are available. Corky Carroll's Surf School operates within the state beach by Lifeguard Tower 18.

Surf fishing for perch, corbina, California corbina, croaker, cabezon, shovelnose guitar fish and sand shark is available. California grunion is a species that only spawns on sandy southern California beaches. Under state law, these fish may be caught by hand with a fishing permit. Wildlife and bird watching are also popular at this state beach.

Lifeguards from the California State Parks Lifeguard Service patrol the beach year-round and lifeguard towers are staffed during the summer.

== History ==
The area that is now Bolsa Chica State Beach was once called "Tin Can Beach" by locals. The 169-acre (68 ha) property was added to the state park system in 1960.

In 1967, a nuclear power and desalination plant was planned on Bolsa Island, a man-made island off the beach. It was supposed to produce more electricity than the Hoover Dam. However, the plans were abandoned by its chairman Jack K. Horton in 1968, as Southern California Edison was unable to raise sufficient capital, despite rate hikes and the sale of common stocks.

== See also ==
- Bolsa Chica Basin State Marine Conservation Area
- List of beaches in California
- List of California state parks
  - List of California State Beaches
