= Rancho Santa Gertrudes =

Mexican land grant in California

Coordinates: 33.950°N 118.060°W

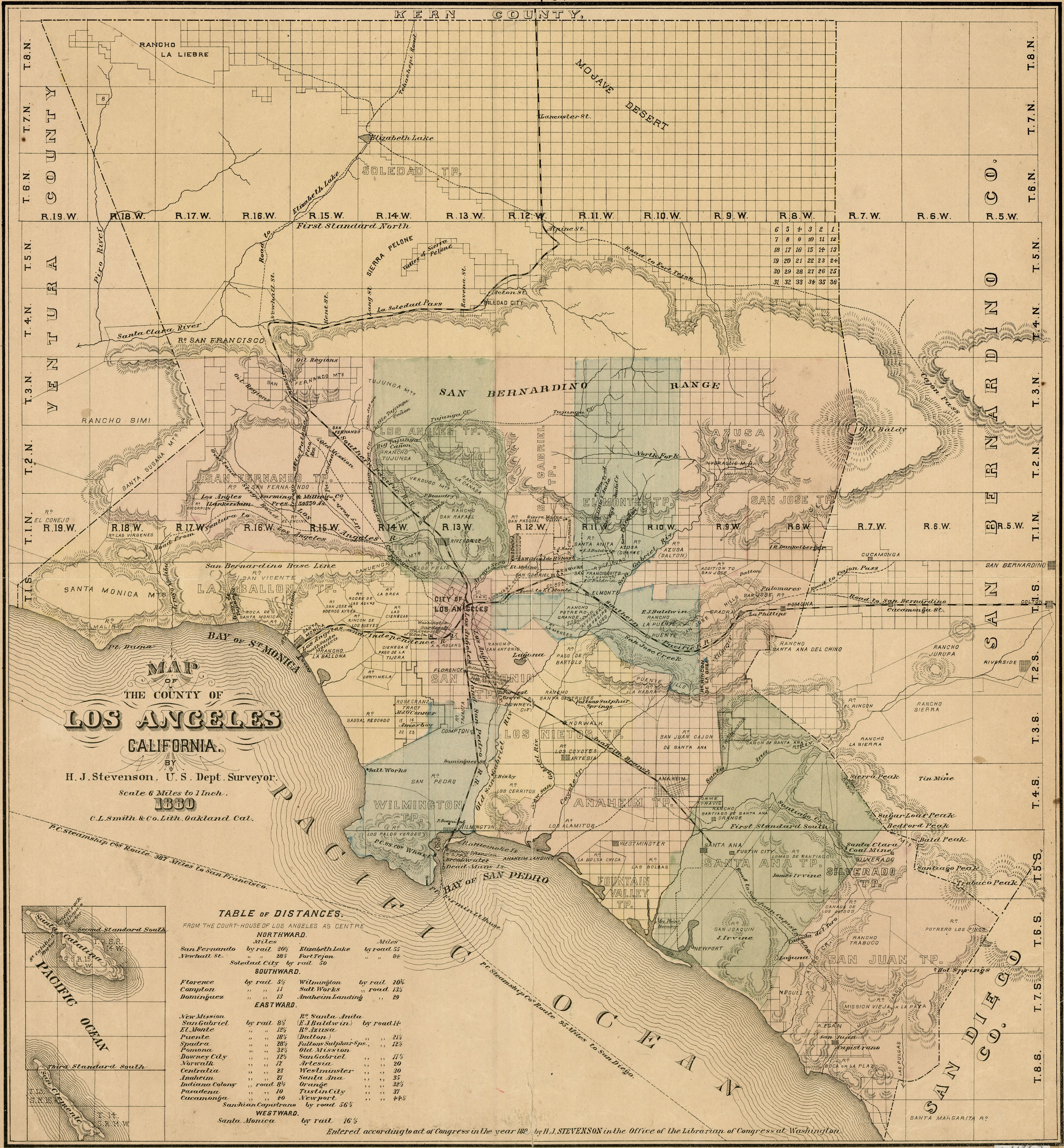
1880 map of Los Angeles County showing Rancho Santa Gertrudes and "Fulton's Sulphur Springs," later known as Santa Fe Springs

Rancho Santa Gertrudes was a 21,298-acre (86.19 km^{2}) 1834 Mexican land grant, in present-day Los Angeles County, California, resulting from a partition of Rancho Los Nietos. A former site of Nacaugna, the rancho lands included the present-day cities of Downey, Santa Fe Springs and the northern part of Norwalk.

== History ==
At the request of Manuel Nieto heirs, governor José Figueroa in 1834, officially declared the 167,000-acre (680 km^{2}) Rancho Los Nietos grant under Mexican rule and ordered its partition into five smaller ranchos: Las Bolsas, Los Alamitos, Los Cerritos, Los Coyotes, and Santa Gertrudes.

Josefa Cota (widow of Antonio Maria Nieto, son of Manuel Nieto) received the Rancho Santa Gertrudes grant. Lemuel Carpenter (1808–1859), who had married Maria de Los Angeles Dominguez, a niece of Josefa Cota, bought the rancho in 1843 from Josefa Cota, his aunt by marriage.

With the cession of California to the United States following the Mexican–American War, the 1848 Treaty of Guadalupe Hidalgo provided that the land grants would be honored. As required by the Land Act of 1851, a claim for part of Rancho Santa Gertrudes was filed by Lemuel Carpenter with the Public Land Commission in 1852. Carpenter, who was deeply in debt to John G. Downey, killed himself in 1859. In 1859 the rancho was sold at a sheriff's auction to Downey and James P. McFarland. 17,602 acres (71.2 km^{2}) of the grant was patented to McFarland and Downey in 1870.

A claim for part of Rancho Santa Gertrudes was filed by Thomas Sanchez Colima with the Public Land Commission in 1852, and 3,696 acres (15.0 km^{2}) of the grant was patented to Thomas Sanchez Colima in 1877. Another claim was filed by Concepción Nieto, but was rejected.

The southern border between Ranchos Santa Gertrudes and Los Coyotes exists today as Leffingwell Road. The street Santa Gertrudes Avenue, which runs from Los Angeles County Route N8 to California State Route 72, is named after the rancho.

== Historic sites of the Rancho ==
- Hathaway Ranch Museum
- Historical Railroad Exhibit

== See also ==
- Ranchos of Los Angeles County, California
- List of Ranchos of California
- Ranchos of California
