= Rancho Las Bolsas =

Mexican land grant

Coordinates: 33.690°N 118.030°W

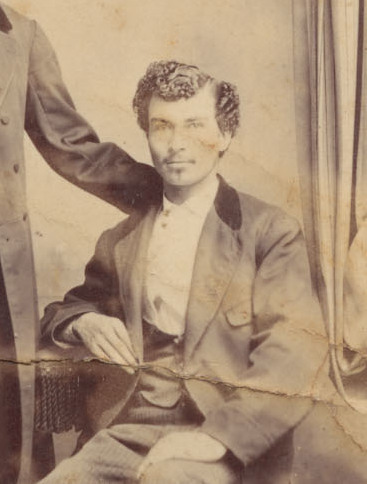
Ramón Yorba, a Californio ranchero, was patented half of Rancho Las Bolsas in 1872 by the Public Land Commission.

Rancho Las Bolsas was a 33,460-acre (135.4 km^{2}) 1834 Mexican land grant resulting from the partition of Rancho Los Nietos, located from the coast on inland within present day northwestern Orange County, California. The Spanish name "las bolsas" means "the pockets", and refers to pockets of land amongst the marsh wetlands of the Santa Ana River estuary. The rancho lands, adjacent to the southeast of Rancho La Bolsa Chica, include the present day cities of Huntington Beach, Garden Grove, Fountain Valley and Westminster.

== History ==
At the request of the Manuel Nieto heirs, Governor José Figueroa in 1834, officially declared the 167,000-acre (680 km^{2}) Rancho Los Nietos grant under Mexican rule and ordered its partition into five smaller ranchos: Las Bolsas, Los Alamitos, Los Cerritos, Los Coyotes, and Santa Gertrudes.

Maria Catarina Ruiz (widow of Jose Antonio Nieto, son of Manuel Nieto) received Las Bolsas.

With the cession of California to the United States following the Mexican-American War, the 1848 Treaty of Guadalupe Hidalgo provided that the land grants would be honored. As required by the Land Act of 1851, a claim for Rancho Las Bolsas was filed by Ramón Yorba with the Public Land Commission in 1852 and he received a US patent for an undivided half in 1874.

A claim was filed by Maria Cleof'a Nieto Murillo and her husband Juan Jose Murillo with the Land Commission in 1852, but was rejected by the commission in 1855, because the claimants failed to connect themselves with the grant to Maria Catarina Ruiz. On appeal to the US District Court, this decree was reversed in 1857, and a US patent received for an undivided half in 1877.

Abel Stearns became the sole owner of the rancho by 1860, changing the name to Stearns Rancho, and adding it to his land empire. It did not become part of his financial remedy, as his six other ranchos did, as part of the 1868 Robinson Trust. However, the ownership of the grant was challenged later in 1886.
