= Rancho Los Cerritos =

Mexican land grant in California

Coordinates: 33.830°N 118.170°W

Rancho Los Cerritos was a 27,054-acre (109.48 km^{2}) 1834 Mexican land grant in present-day southern Los Angeles County and Orange County, California The grant was the result of a partition of the Rancho Los Nietos grant. "Cerritos" means "little hills" in Spanish. The rancho lands include the present-day cities of Cerritos, Downey, Lakewood, Paramount, Bellflower, Signal Hill, and Long Beach.

== History ==
At the request of Manuel Nieto heirs, governor José Figueroa in 1834, officially declared the 167,000-acre (680 km^{2}) Rancho Los Nietos grant under Mexican rule and ordered its partition into five smaller ranchos: Las Bolsas, Los Alamitos, Los Cerritos, Los Coyotes, and Santa Gertrudes. Manuela Nieto (daughter of Manuel Nieto) and her husband Guillermo Cota received Los Cerritos.

Jonathan Temple married Rafaela Cota in 1830, and in 1843, he purchased Rancho Los Cerritos from the Cota family.

With the cession of California to the United States following the Mexican–American War, the 1848 Treaty of Guadalupe Hidalgo provided that the land grants would be honored. As required by the Land Act of 1851, a claim for Rancho Los Cerritos was filed with the Public Land Commission in 1852 and Temple received the US patent for the rancho in 1867. Following the drought of 1863–64, Temple sold the rancho to Flint, Bixby & Company in 1866. By the 1870s, sheep ranching was in decline in southern California and Jotham Bixby began to sell off this land for development.

== Historic sites of the Rancho ==
- Rancho Los Cerritos Ranch House. Adobe hacienda built by Jonathan Temple in 1844.

== See also ==
- Ranchos of California
- List of Ranchos of California
