= Manuel Nieto (soldier) =

Mexican soldier

Jose Manuel Nieto (1734–1804) was a soldier from the Presidio of San Diego who was assigned to the Mission San Gabriel at the time his land was granted by the Spanish Empire in 1784.

== Spanish soldier ==
Nieto was a man of mixed European and African descent, born in New Navarre, Mexico in 1734. He came to Alta California with the Gaspar de Portolà expedition of 1769. He served in the Royal Army in the province of Alta California. Jose Manuel Perez-Nieto was first mentioned as a soldier of the Presidio of Monterey, in 1773.

== Rancho Los Nietos ==
Presidio soldiers were permitted to raise cattle for food and make a small profit. As his cattle numbers increased, the need for more grazing land was required. In 1784, he was granted a provisional grant of the land that would become Rancho Los Nietos by Pedro Fages, the governor of Alta California.

The original grant was 300,000 acres (1,200 km^{2}), but in 1785 Father Sanchez from the San Gabriel Mission contested the Nietos grant on the grounds that it encroached upon the southern portion of their property. A decision in favor of the mission was reached and Rancho Los Nietos was reduced to nearly half of its original size, but still leaving Corporal Nieto with 167,000 acres (680 km^{2}). Nieto retired from duty in 1795 and settled down on his rancho with his family. A small community called Los Nietos gradually built up around the Nietos adobe home, which was near the Indian village of Sejat on the San Jose Creek. Today, the area of West Whittier-Los Nietos, California is located near the original rancho home site.

Upon Manuel's death, his rancho was inherited by his widow and four children.

== Descendants ==
He married Maria Teresa Morillo.

The children of Jose Manuel Nieto and María Teresa Morillo (1756–1816)
Name	Birth/Death	Married	Notes
Juan Jose Nieto	1781 –	Maria Tomasa Tapia	received Rancho Los Alamitos, Rancho Los Coyotes, Rancho Palos Alto
Jose Antonio Nieto	1785 –	Maria Catarina Ruiz	received Rancho Las Bolsas
Maria Manuela Nieto	1791 –	Guillermo Cota	received Rancho Los Cerritos
Antonio Maria Nieto	1796 –	Maria Josefa Alvina Cota	received Rancho Santa Gertrudes
