= Rancho Los Alamitos =

Historic house in California, United States

- U.S. National Register of Historic Places
- Long Beach Historic Landmark
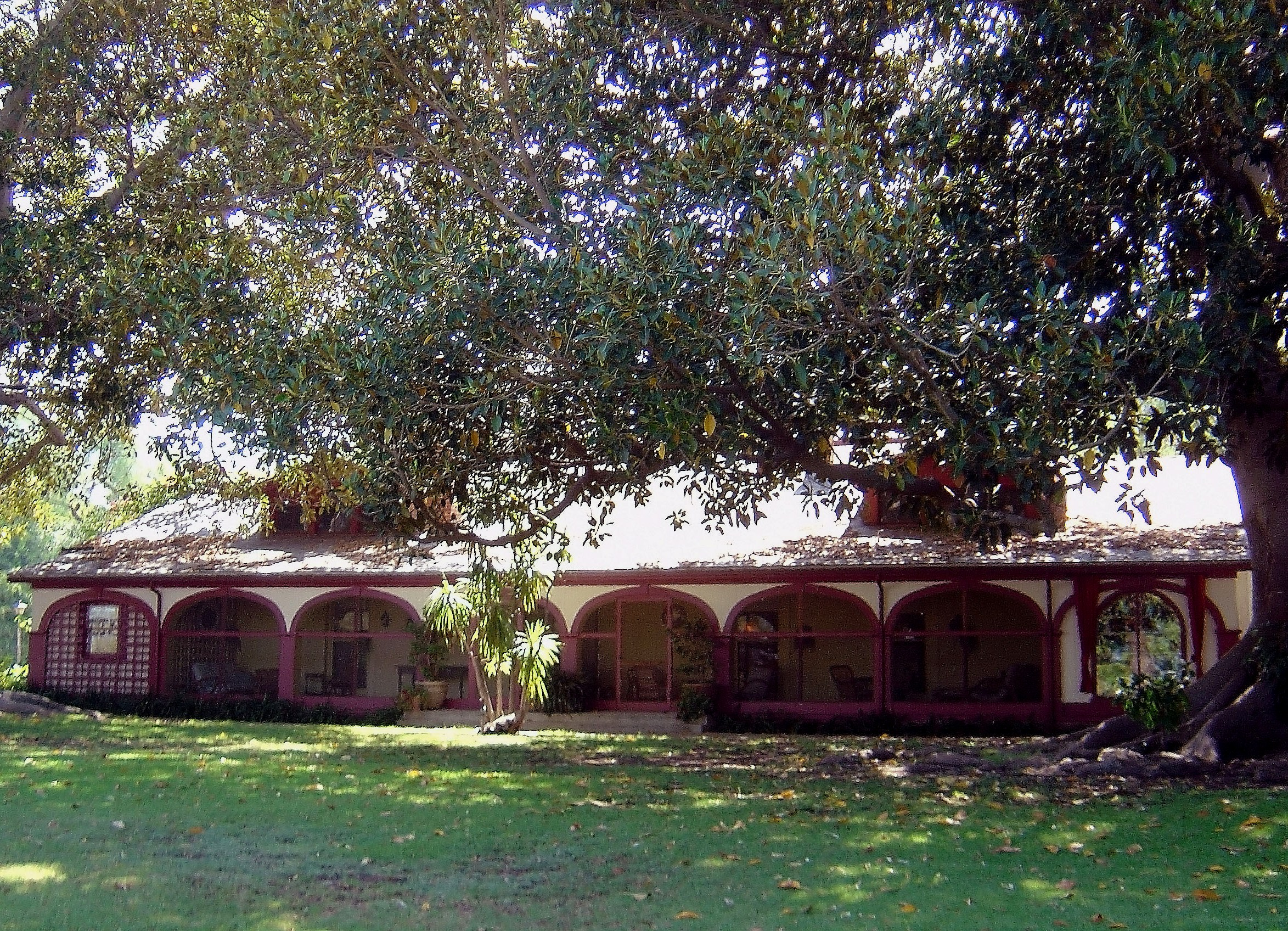
- The exterior house at Rancho Los Alamitos, July 2008

- Location within the Los Angeles metropolitan area Location within California Location within the United States
- Location: 6400 Bixby Hill Rd., Long Beach, California
- Coordinates: 33°46′36″N 118°6′25″W
- Area: 7.4 acres (3.0 ha)
- Built: c. 1800–1834
- Architectural style: Spanish Colonial
- Website: www.rancholosalamitos.com
- NRHP reference No.: 81000153
- Added to NRHP: July 7, 1981

Rancho Los Alamitos is a historic rancho and adobe residence located in present-day Long Beach, California. The name derives from an 1834 Mexican partition of the earlier Rancho Los Nietos (1784), one of the first Spanish land grants in Alta California. Covering over 28,000 acres (110 km^{2}), it once extended across large portions of present-day Long Beach, Los Alamitos, Rossmoor, and parts of Seal Beach, Cypress, Stanton, and Garden Grove.

The rancho's name translates to "The Little Cottonwoods", in reference to the native Populus fremontii trees that grew in the area. Today, the restored adobe house, gardens, and barns function as a public museum interpreting centuries of regional history.

== Early history ==
The site of Rancho Los Alamitos was originally home to the Tongva (Gabrieliño) village of Povuu’nga, a major ceremonial and trade center inhabited from at least 500 CE until the late 18th century. The location, in the floodplain of the Los Angeles, San Gabriel, and Santa Ana Rivers, featured fertile soils and reliable springs at Alamitos Mesa.

== Spanish and Mexican periods ==
Rancho Los Alamitos originated as one of five ranchos formed from the 1784 Rancho Los Nietos concession awarded by Governor Pedro Fages to Manuel Nieto. After Nieto's death, his heirs requested subdivision, and in 1834 Governor José Figueroa granted Rancho Los Alamitos as a separate estate.

== Abel Stearns era ==
In 1844, Abel Stearns, a Massachusetts-born merchant, who married Arcadia Bandini, acquired Rancho Los Alamitos. Stearns became one of the most prominent rancheros of Mexican California, raising vast cattle herds that supplied beef during the California Gold Rush. By the early 1850s, Rancho Los Alamitos was the headquarters of the largest cattle ranch in the United States.

Following U.S. annexation, Stearns secured legal title to the rancho through the Land Act of 1851, receiving a federal land patent in 1874. However, drought in the 1860s forced him to lease out and eventually lose control of the land.

== The Bixby family and land development ==
In the 1880s, John William Bixby and his cousins Jotham Bixby and Llewellyn Bixby, along with banker Isaias W. Hellman, purchased Rancho Los Alamitos for $141,000. John Bixby began developing the Alamitos Beach tract, but died suddenly in 1888, leading to partition of the estate among the partners.

The Bixbys experimented with sugar beet cultivation, partnering with industrialist William Andrews Clark to establish a refinery. Later, discovery of the Long Beach Oil Field brought new wealth to the rancho lands.

== 20th century to present ==
In 1967, owner Fred Bixby donated the core historic property—including the adobe ranch house, barns, and surrounding gardens—to the City of Long Beach. It was added to the National Register of Historic Places in 1981.

== Historic features ==
The Rancho Los Alamitos site today includes:

- The early 19th-century adobe ranch house
- Restored barns and ranching facilities
- Historic gardens designed by Frederick Law Olmsted Jr. and Florence Yoch & Lucile Council
- Notable Moreton Bay fig trees (Ficus macrophylla), designated as horticultural landmarks

== Current use ==
Rancho Los Alamitos operates as a museum and cultural center. Its exhibits interpret the history of the Tongva people, the Spanish and Mexican rancho periods, and the American ranching and agricultural eras. The site also hosts educational programs, cultural events, and guided tours.

== See also ==
- Los Cerritos Ranch House
- List of City of Long Beach Historic Landmarks
- List of Ranchos of California
- Ranchos of Orange County
- Ranchos of Los Angeles County
