= Yorba =

Yorba may refer to:

== People ==
- Bernardo Yorba (1800–1858), native of Nueva California and the son of Spanish soldier, José Antonio Yorba
- José Antonio Yorba (1743–1825), Spanish soldier and early settler of Spanish California

== Places ==
- Don Bernardo Yorba Ranchhouse, the most palatial adobe haciendas in all of Alta California
- Placentia-Yorba Linda Unified School District (PYLUSD) is a public school district in Orange County, California
- Rancho La Sierra (Yorba), 17,769-acre (71.91 km^{2}) Mexican land grant in present-day Riverside County, California
- Yorba Linda, California, affluent suburban community in northeastern Orange County, California
- Yorba Linda Fault, fault system that extends from North East Yorba Linda, California to the South Eastern portion of Chino Hills, California

== Other ==
- "Hotel Yorba", the lead single from White Blood Cells, by Detroit (Michigan) garage rock band The White Stripes
- Yorba Linda Firestorms, series of major wildfires in 2008 that originated in Corona, California
- Yorba Linda Spotlight Theater, nonprofit theater organization for children and teenagers
- Yorba Linda Water District, public agency responsible for water supply and quality for residents of Yorba Linda, California
- Yorba Foundation, a non-profit software group based in San Francisco, known for developing Shotwell and Geary
- Yorba (software), a web-based personal information management platform
