= Rancho La Sierra =

Mexican land grant in California

Rancho La Sierra La Sierra de Santa Ana
- Mexican land grant
- Location in Southern California
- Coordinates: 33.880°N 117.540°W
- Country: United States
- State: California
- County: Riverside
- Granted: 1846
- Founder: Vicenta Sepulveda
- Named for: The Sierra (mountains) beside the Santa Ana River

Area
  - Total: 17,774 acres (7,193 ha)
- Later sites include the city of Norco, La Sierra University, and Camp Anza

Rancho La Sierra (also called "La Sierra de Santa Ana") was a 17,774-acre (71.93 km^{2}) Mexican land grant in present-day Riverside County, California, United States. In 1846 Governor Pio Pico issued the grant to Vicenta Sepulveda. The rancho includes the present-day city of Norco, and the western end of Riverside.

== History ==
Maria Vicenta Sepulveda (1816–1907) was a daughter of Francisco Sepulveda, recipient of the Rancho San Vicente y Santa Monica land grant. Vicenta married Tomas Antonio Yorba (1788–1845) in 1834. Tomas was a son of José Antonio Yorba, the grantee of Rancho Santiago de Santa Ana in present-day Orange County. Tomas, along with some of his brothers, pastured animals on lands east of their father's Rancho Santiago de Santa Ana, and in 1834 his brother Bernardo Yorba requested, and was granted, Rancho Cañón de Santa Ana. Tomas and Bernardo continued to pasture lands even further east, in an area they had named La Sierra.

In 1845, after Tomas had died, Bernardo applied for four square leagues of the La Sierra lands. Nine days later Vicenta Sepulveda, then a widow and going by her maiden name, also applied for some of the same La Sierra lands. On June 15, 1846 Governor Pio Pico granted the east half of the lands, Rancho La Sierra (Sepulveda), to Vicente Sepulveda, and the west half, Rancho La Sierra (Yorba) to Bernado Yorba. Vicenta married Jose Ramon Carrillo (1821–1864) in 1847.

With the cession of California to the United States following the Mexican-American War, the 1848 Treaty of Guadalupe Hidalgo provided that the land grants would be honored. As required by the Land Act of 1851, a claim for Rancho La Sierra was filed with the Public Land Commission in 1852, and the grant was patented to Vicenta Sepulveda in 1877.

In 1858, Vicenta Sepulveda de Carrillo bought Rancho Valle de San Jose.

Abel Stearns purchased Rancho La Sierra, but was forced to sell after the drought of 1863. The rancho passed through several owners including the San Jacinto Land Company. It was purchased by James W. Long in 1908. Long formed the Orange Heights Water Company and began developing the area in 1910.

Through several acquisitions Willitts J. Hole (1858–1936), a Los Angeles businessman, purchased much of the original Rancho, eventually owning more than 17,000 acres (69 km^{2}). Hole continued to use the land as a ranch, which became known as the Hole Ranch, and he built a large mansion on the property. He later began subdividing the property for various developments. In 1922, he sold 400 acres (2 km^{2}) of the land to the Seventh-day Adventist Church. In 1942, the U.S. Army purchased 1,239 acres (5 km^{2}) of the ranch from the Hole estate, and set up Camp Anza, a World War II disembarkation facility.

The North Corona Land Company bought some of the property 1921 after it was established as a subdivision of the Corona Land Company for citrus growing. The name Norco is an abbreviation of the North Corona portion of the company name. Norco was incorporated as a city in December 1964. Also in 1964 the city of Riverside annexed the rest of the original Rancho La Sierra lands.

=== Etymology ===
Translated from Spanish into English "La Sierra de Santa Ana" means "The mountains of Santa Ana". According to Bernardo's petition for the La Sierra lands, the Yorba brothers had used this name as early as 1825. The name distinguished the higher elevation La Sierra de Santa Ana lands from Bernardo's Cañón de Santa Ana lands, both positioned beside the Santa Ana River.

Western Riverside continues to be referred to as La Sierra, with four separate city neighborhoods beginning with the name. After the Seventh-day Adventist Church purchased a large section of the land they opened the La Sierra Academy, today known as La Sierra University.

== Historic sites of the Rancho ==
- Hole Mansion. Arthur Benton designed the rustic bungalow, built on the site between 1912 and 1915 for Willits J. Hole.

== See also ==
- Ranchos of California
- List of Ranchos of California
