= Santa Ana Valley =

Valley in Orange County, California, US

Coordinates: 34.4247°N 119.3448°W

The Santa Ana Valley is located in Orange County, California and is bisected by the Santa Ana River. The valley is home to most of Orange County's central business districts. The cities of Anaheim, Buena Park, Costa Mesa, Fullerton, Irvine, Orange, Placentia, Santa Ana, and Yorba Linda are located in the Santa Ana Valley.

== History ==
This valley was named Vallejo de Santa Ana in 1769 following the Gaspar de Portolà expedition, of which Friar Junípero Serra was a part, as well as Sargeant José Antonio Yorba, and José Manuel Nieto. The mission located closest to the Santa Ana Valley is Mission San Juan Capistrano, which was built east of the San Joaquin Hills, in the present day city of San Juan Capistrano.

=== Ranchos ===
The historic Ranchos of California in the Santa Ana Valley area:

- Rancho Santiago de Santa Ana
- Rancho San Joaquin
- Rancho Lomas de Santiago
- Rancho San Juan Cajón de Santa Ana
- Rancho Vallejo de Santa Ana

== See also ==
- Category: Ranchos of Orange County, California
- List of Ranchos of California
