= Rancho El Rincon =

Mexican land grant in California

Coordinates: 33.940°N 117.670°W

Rancho El Rincón was a 4,431-acre (17.93 km^{2}) Mexican land grant in present-day San Bernardino County and Riverside County, California given in 1839 to Juan Bandini by Governor Juan Alvarado. El rincón means "the corner" in Spanish. The grant, located south of present-day Chino, was bounded on the east by Rancho Jurupa, on the south by the Santa Ana River, on the west by Rancho Cañón de Santa Ana, and extending northerly from the river one league. The rancho lands include Prado Regional Park.

== History ==
=== Rancho El Rincon ===
The one square league Rancho El Rincón was granted to Juan Bandini by Governor Alvarado in 1839. Juan Bandini sold the rancho to Bernardo Yorba. Bernardo Yorba was the grantee of Rancho Cañón de Santa Ana and Rancho La Sierra.

With the cession of California to the United States following the Mexican-American War, the 1848 Treaty of Guadalupe Hidalgo provided that the land grants would be honored. As required by the Land Act of 1851, a claim for Rancho El Rincon was filed with the Public Land Commission in 1853, and the grant was patented to Bernardo Yorba in 1879.

=== Rincon and Prado ===
A village called Rincón developed near the river crossing on the Santa Ana River, near the upper mouth of the canyon cut by the river between the Chino Hills and the mountains to the south. It had a post office from December 12, 1870, to August 24, 1874, and from November 19, 1887, to April 11, 1907. At the request of the Santa Fe Railway, which already had stops in several towns also named Rincón, the name of the town and post office was changed to Prado ("meadow") in 1907. This new post office operated until May 31, 1935, when it was consolidated with Corona. Following the destruction of much of the town and local farms in the Flood of 1938, the village of Prado was removed during the building of Prado Dam in 1941.

== Historic sites of the Rancho ==
Yorba-Slaughter Adobe. Bernardo Yorba's son, Raymundo (also spelled Raimundo) built the first house at the Yorba Slaughter Adobe site in 1851. The structure burned and was replaced by the present structure in 1852–53. The property was purchased in 1868 by Fenton M. Slaughter, an American born in Virginia in 1826, a veteran of the Mexican-American War of 1846, and later a blacksmith, surveyor, and sheep and cattle broker in the Los Angeles area. Listed on the National Register of Historic Places listings in San Bernardino County, California, it is San Bernardino County Landmark 191.

== See also ==
- David W. Alexander, 19th century Los Angeles, California, politician and sheriff, lived on the Rancho
- List of ghost towns in California
