= Rancho La Sierra (Yorba) =

Mexican land grant in California (1846)

Coordinates: 33.860°N 117.580°W

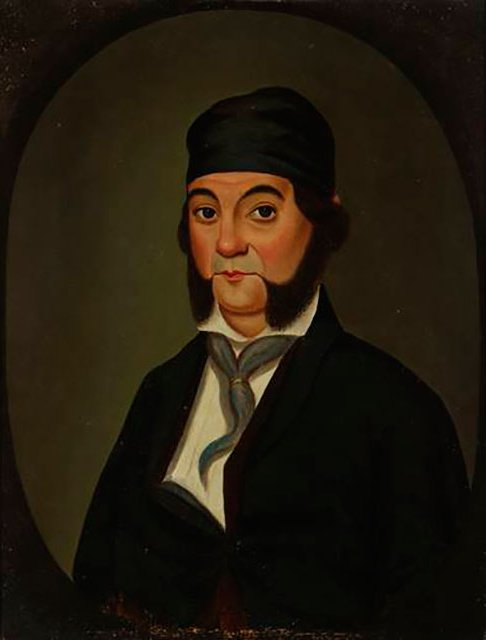
Don Bernardo Yorba, a wealthy Californio ranchero, was granted Rancho La Sierra in 1846.

Rancho La Sierra (also called La Sierra de Santa Ana) was a 17,769-acre (71.91 km^{2}) Mexican land grant in present-day Riverside County, California, United States. In 1846 governor Pio Pico issued the grant to Bernardo Yorba. The grant lay between Rancho Jurupa and Rancho El Rincon, and included the present-day city of Corona.

== History ==
Bernardo Yorba's father, José Antonio Yorba, was the grantee of Rancho Santiago de Santa Ana in present-day Orange County. For years Bernardo (1800–1858) and his brothers pastured animals on lands east of their father's rancho, and in 1834 Bernardo requested, and was granted, Rancho Cañón de Santa Ana. Bernardo and his brother Tomas (1787–1845) continued to pasture heards even further east, in an area they had named La Sierra.

In 1845, after his brother Tomas had died, Bernardo applied for four square leagues of the La Sierra lands. Nine days later Maria Vicenta Sepulveda, the widow of Bernardo's brother Tomas, also applied for some of the same La Sierra lands. On June 15, 1846 Governor Pio Pico granted the west half of the lands, Rancho La Sierra (Yorba), to Bernado Yorba, and the east half, Rancho La Sierra (Sepulveda), to Vicente Sepulveda.

With the cession of California to the United States following the Mexican-American War, the 1848 Treaty of Guadalupe Hidalgo provided that the land grants would be honored. As required by the Land Act of 1851, a claim for Rancho La Sierra (Yorba) was filed with the Public Land Commission in 1852, and the grant was patented to Bernardo Yorba in 1875.

When the state of California was admitted into the Union in 1850 Rancho La Sierra became part of Los Angeles County, but by the time the US patent was filed, Rancho La Sierra was a part of San Bernardino County. In 1893, the Rancho became part of Riverside County when the California Legislature authorized the formation of Riverside County taking lands from both San Bernardino County and San Diego County.

R.B. Taylor, George L. Joy, Samuel Merrill, A. S. Garretson, and Adolph Rimpau, a citrus growers' organization, purchased Rancho La Sierra of Bernardo Yorba, and the Rancho Temescal grant of Leandro Serrano in 1886. The colony was laid out as South Riverside, and in 1896 renamed Corona (Spanish: "Crown") for a 3-mile (5-km) circular drive that is now around the central city and was the site of international automobile races from 1913 to 1916.

Bernardo Yorba expanded his lands further when he purchased Rancho El Rincon from Juan Bandini.

== Etymology ==
Translated from Spanish into English, "La Sierra de Santa Ana" means "The mountains of Santa Ana". According to Bernardo's petition for the La Sierra lands, the Yorba brothers had used this name as early as 1825. The name distinguished the higher elevation La Sierra de Santa Ana lands from Bernardo's Cañón de Santa Ana lands, both positioned beside the Santa Ana River.

== Historic sites ==
- Corona Founders Monument – Taylor, Joy, Merrill, Garretson, and Rimpau, having purchased Rancho La Sierra of Bernardo Yorba and Rancho Temescal of Leandro Serrano on May 4, 1886, founded the citrus colony and town of Corona.

== See also ==
- Ranchos of California
- List of Ranchos of California
