= Susanna Bixby Bryant =

American horticulturalist and rancher (1880–1946)

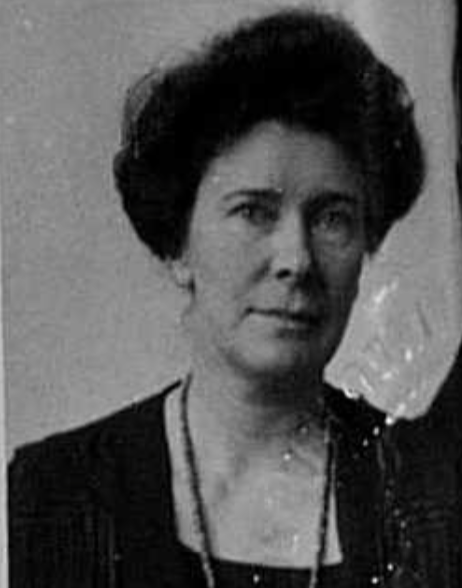
- Susanna Bixby Bryant
- Born: 11 April 1880; Long Beach, California, U.S.
- Died: 2 October 1946 (aged 66); Santa Barbara, California, U.S.
- Occupation(s): Horticulturalist, rancher, botanical collector
- Known for: Founder of Rancho Santa Ana Botanic Garden (now California Botanic Garden)
- Spouse: Ernest A. Bryant
- Children: 2

Susanna Bixby Bryant (April 11, 1880 – October 2, 1946) was an American horticulturalist, rancher, botanical collector and the founder of the Rancho Santa Ana Botanic Garden in Claremont, California, the largest botanic garden in the state that houses California native plants.

== Early life and education ==
Born on April 11, 1880, in Long Beach, Los Angeles County, California, United States, Susanna Bixby Bryant was the daughter of John William Bixby and Susan Patterson Hathaway. During her childhood, she resided at her family home in the Rancho Los Alamitos. After graduating from the Miss Hersey's School in Boston, she traveled extensively.

== Rancho Santa Ana ==
In 1875, John Bixby purchased 5,000 acres of land in eastern Yorba Linda, California from the widow of Bernardo Yorba, a prominent Californio landowner, after whom Yorba Linda is named. Bixby later named his property, Rancho Santa Ana, after the Santa Ana River that flowed adjacent to his land. He raised cattle and sheep.

== Rancho Santa Ana Botanic Garden ==
Following the death of her father in 1891, Bryant inherited the ranch. She recognized that California's more than 6000 native plant species were under appreciated and under threat. In 1927, Bryant established, in memory of her father, a native garden on family's Cañon de Santa Ana ranch in Orange County, California to preserve California's native plants and to showcase garden areas designed to assemble native plants in to the communities with which they occur in nature. In advance of launching her 'wild garden,' Bryant had extensive correspondence with authorities on both gardens and California native plants. In 1926, for example, Bryant wrote to Charles Sprague Sargent, professor of Aboriculture, Harvard University outlining her vision for developing a botanic garden. In 1929, she hired the Olmsted Brothers, a landscape architectural firm, to help in designing 200 acres of land for gardening. In 1930, Frederick Law Olmsted Jr. proposed a detailed plan which included plantings of different native plants, and creating pools and pathways, with original trails and roads.

== California Botanic Garden ==
Rancho Santa Ana Botanic Garden was relocated to Claremont California in the early 1950s to affiliate with the Claremont Colleges, including Pomona College which had an active botany program. This move followed the death of Mrs. Bryant in 1946 and took place under the leadership of Philip Munz who had been hired by Bryant to be the first scientist to lead Rancho Santa Ana Botanic Garden. In 2020, the Garden rebranded - via a 'doing business as' arrangement - as California Botanic Garden. This name accurately reflects Mrs. Bryant's ambition for her Garden. California Botanic Garden's mission is to advance knowledge, conservation and appreciation of California Native Plants.

== Membership ==
Bryant was the member of the California Historical Society and the Garden Club of America.

== Personal life ==
Bryant married Dr. Ernest A. Bryant, born in Canada, who was the personal physician of American railroad magnate Henry E. Huntington and lived in Los Angeles. They had two children.

== Death ==
Bryant died on October 2, 1946, in Santa Barbara, California.
