= Yorba Cemetery =

Historic cemetery in California, US

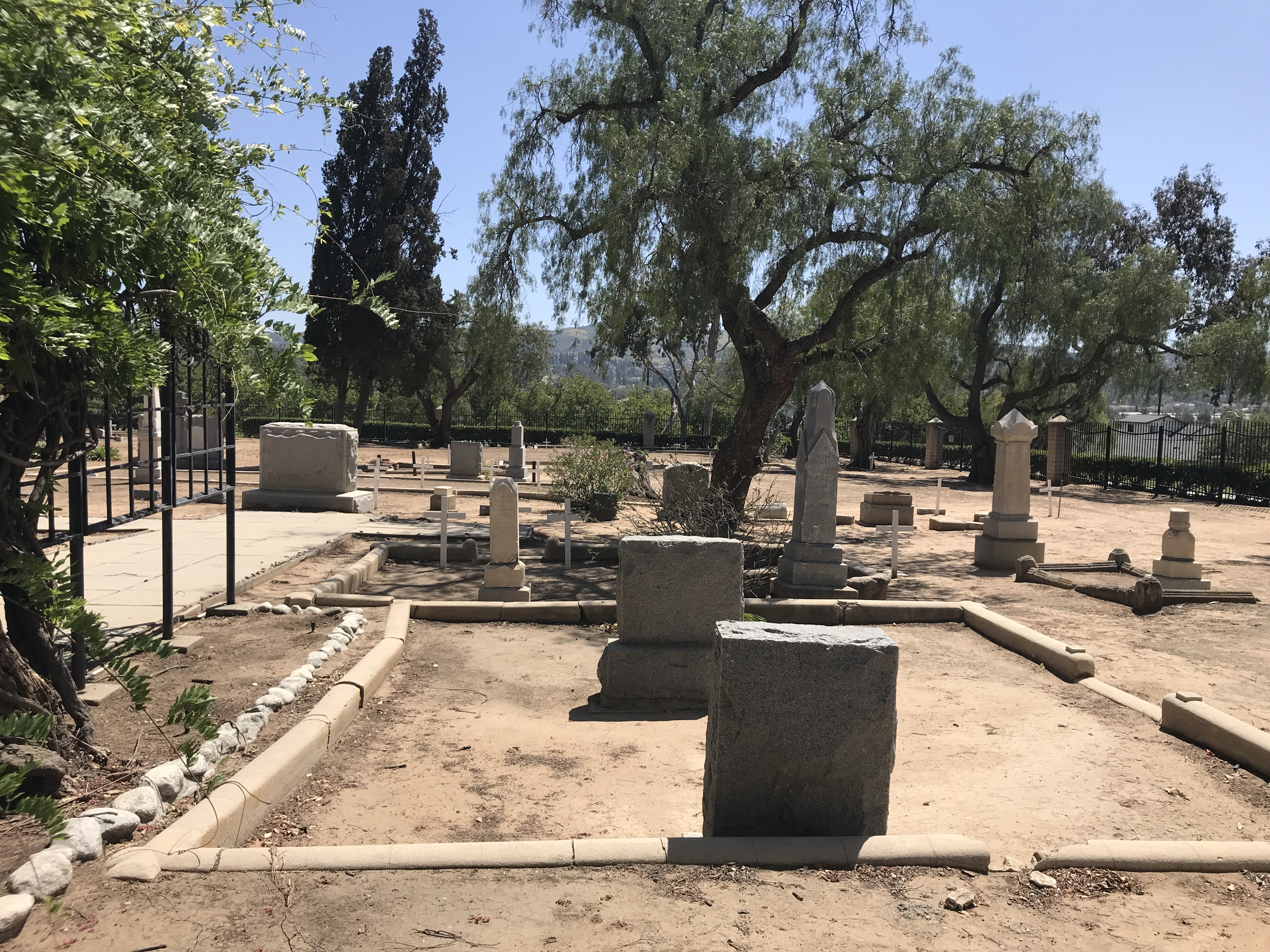

Details
- Established: 1858
- Location: 6749 Parkwood Court, Yorba Linda, California
- Country: United States
- Coordinates: 33°51′53″N 117°47′01″W
- Type: Public
- Owned by: Orange County, California
- Size: 40,000 square feet (3,700 m^{2})
- No. of graves: between 120 and 600
- Find a Grave: Yorba Cemetery

Yorba Cemetery is a historic cemetery in Yorba Linda, California, originally part of Bernardo Yorba's Rancho Cañón de Santa Ana. It was deeded to the County of Orange in 1967.

In 1858, the 40,000 square-foot plot of land was willed to the Catholic Church by Bernardo Yorba, as a burial ground to serve Yorba's family and friends. The last official burial occurred in 1939. There is also an even older burial ground north of the cemetery.

== Burials ==
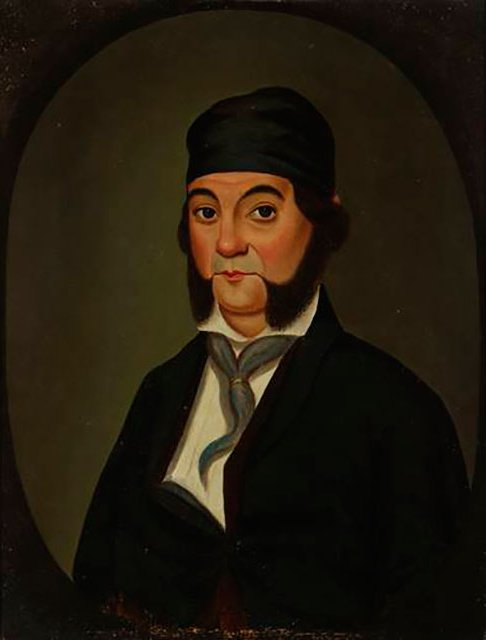
Don Bernardo Yorba, a wealthy Californio ranchero, founded the cemetery.

It is one of the oldest private cemeteries in the state of California. Many members of prominent Californio families such as the Yorba, de los Reyes, Peralta, Dominguez, and Navarro families are buried at the cemetery. The exact number of burials at this cemetery is unknown, but it is estimated between 120 graves (that were identified as of 1993) and up to some 600 graves.

== The Pink Lady ==
According to local legend, a ghost referred to as "The Pink Lady" appears at the cemetery on June 15. Some sources say that she is Alvina de los Reyes, a descendant of the Yorba family, and that she was killed in a buggy accident while returning from a dance at Valencia High School. There are no official reports of the ghost's appearance since the 1980s. Although the ghost herself has not been photographed, energy fields at the cemetery have.

== See also ==
- Yorba Hacienda
