= ISV =

The initialism ISV may refer to:

== Technology ==
- Independent software vendor
- Infantry Squad Vehicle
- Internal security vehicle, armoured vehicle
- International scientific vocabulary

== Other ==
- Cardiff International Sports Village
- International Standard Version of the Bible
- International Student Volunteers
- "ISV", the International Olympic Committee (IOC) country code for the United States Virgin Islands
- Interslavic (ISO 639-3 code), a constructed language
- Immediate Support Vessel of the Indian Navy
