= Yorba Hacienda =

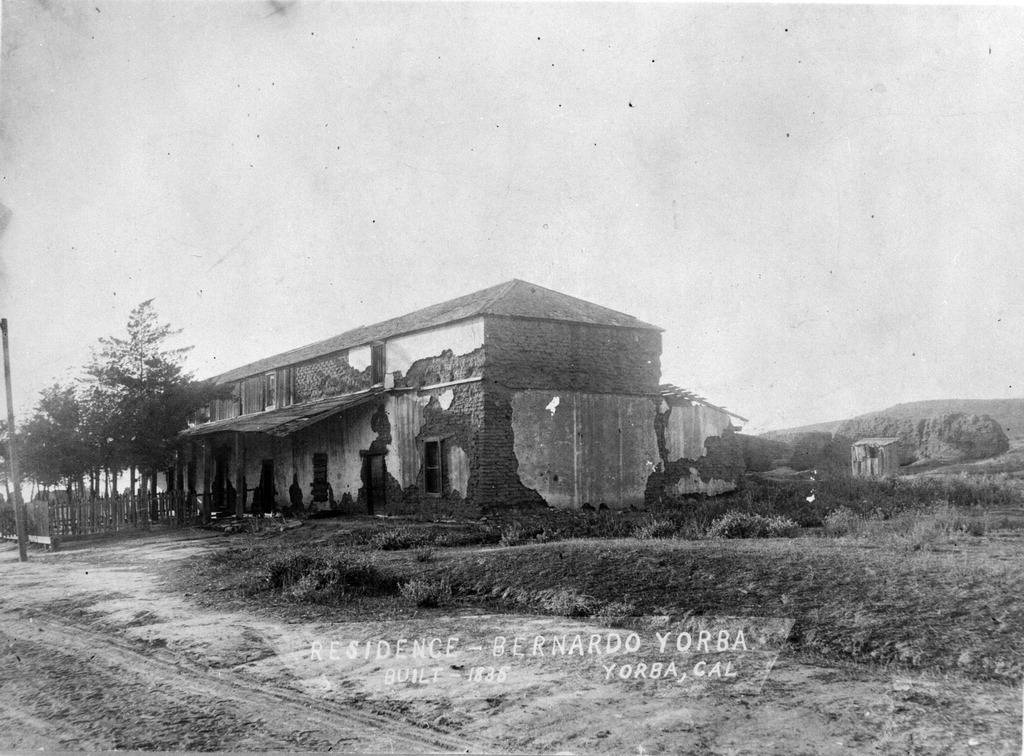
- Yorba Hacienda, 1926

- Location within California
- 33.8641°N 117.7800°W
- Location: Yorba Linda, California

History
- Built: 1830s

California Historical Landmark
- Official name: Don Bernardo Yorba Hacienda
- Reference no.: 226

The Yorba Hacienda was a domestic dwelling constructed by Bernardo Yorba on the Rancho Cañón de Santa Ana Mexican land grant, and located in the present city of Yorba Linda, California. It was notable as the seat of the wealthiest member of the Yorba family and as the largest adobe hacienda in Alta California.

== Construction ==
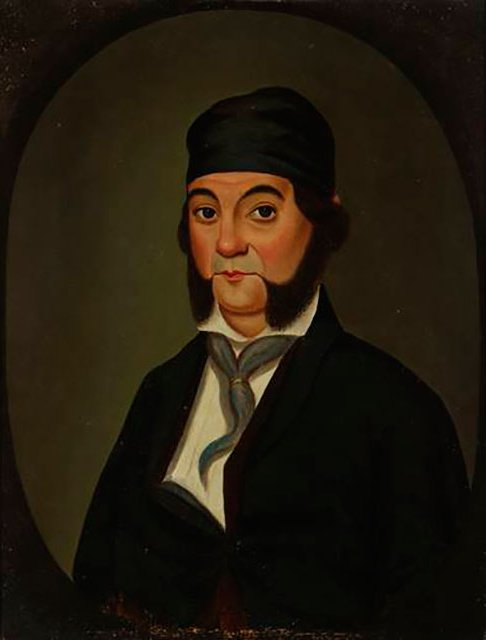
Don Bernardo Yorba, a wealthy Californio ranchero, built the Yorba Hacienda.

On August 1, 1834, Mexican Governor José Figueroa granted to Bernardo Yorba 13,328 acres (53.9 km^{2}) on the north side of the Santa Ana River, about four miles upstream from the José Antonio Yorba hacienda "El Refugio" on Rancho Santiago de Santa Ana.

=== Bernardo Yorba Hacienda ===
In 1835, Bernardo Yorba began construction on a two-story adobe house that was to be one of the finest and largest in all of Alta California. Construction was completed in stages over several years. The main buildings were arranged to form three sides of a square and boasted 200 rooms, although older, more conservative accounts list at least fifty rooms. The southern face of the main structure was measured to be 106 feet in length and surviving photographs show it to be over 20 feet at the peak of the roof. Pine beams were cut and brought by oxen from the San Bernardino Mountains to add support to the structures. Indian servants who made the adobe bricks used in construction lived in their own camp closer to the river, past the chapel just east of the northern end of the old Yorba Bridge (now Imperial Highway bridge).

=== Iglesia de San Antonio ===
Around the time of Bernardo's death in 1858, a small adobe chapel, Iglesia de San Antonio, was built about 1,000 yards southwest of the residence. It was dedicated on April 29, 1860 to San Antonio, patron saint of the Yorba household. In the 1890s the adobe chapel was so weathered that a wooden church was built a few yards away on the west side. The wooden church was abandoned about 1948 and was gone by 1956.

=== Yorba Cemetery ===
About the time the adobe chapel was built, a plot of land on the hill overlooking the hacienda to its southeast was set aside as the Yorba Cemetery. Over 400 people were buried there through the 1930s. Bernardo's remains, those of his second wife, and eight other Yorbas were re-interred there in 1923 when the Old Calvary Cemetery in Los Angeles was closed due to construction. The last burials were in 1939.

== Life at the Hacienda ==
The rancho headquarters, Hacienda de San Antonio, was also known as Rancho San Antonio. Other names include San Antonio de Santa Ana or San Antonio de los Yorbas. This was the center of all activity in the area in that time. In 1842, Governor Manuel Micheltorena stayed at the Yorba homestead and supplied his soldiers with provisions from the ranch. On January 6, 1847, General Stephen W. Kearny and Commodore Robert F. Stockton camped just down stream from the hacienda, in a Yorba irrigation ditch which ran from the Santa Ana River to Santa Ana Vieja. Just days later they won the Battle of Rio San Gabriel near Los Angeles, securing southern California for the Americans and leading to the end of Mexican rule in California.

Being far from the nearest town, Los Angeles, Bernado Yorba thought it wise to have all the trades represented on site. There were four woolcombers, two tanners, one soapmaker, and one butter and cheese man who supervised the milking of 50 to 60 cows. There was also a harness maker, two shoe makers, a jeweler, and one plasterer as well as a carpenter and a blacksmith. Yorba also had two errand boys, one sheepherder, a cook and a baker. Also employed were two washer women, one woman to iron, four sewing women, a dressmaker, two gardeners, a schoolmaster and winemakers. Among the wines made, Angelica and Port are mentioned, as well as the distilling of whiskey and brandy. Provisions were brought all the way from San Francisco for the hacienda; dates, dried fruits, fancy crackers and candy were also supplied to surrounding ranches. About 100 Gabrieleño Indians worked for Bernardo Yorba on the rancho, living in a nearby village.

As the auxiliary alcalde, Bernardo needed a place to keep lawbreakers. A jail was located between the main residence and the schoolrooms. The dark cellar below ground was called the 'dungeon' where criminals were locked up.

After the death of Bernardo Yorba in 1858, the Indian servants left and the hacienda went into a slow decline as property and land was divided among the Yorba heirs.

== Destruction ==
In 1917 and again in late 1919, Don Meadows and Roch Bradshaw, two local students, visited the ruins to measure, photograph and study the site. Don Meadows would later write a short account of their explorations, published as "The House of Bernardo Yorba" by the Orange County Historical Society. The Yorba family and the County Supervisors could not agree on the amount of land to be set aside for the preservation of the Yorba home. In 1926 the property's owner, Samuel Kraemer, demolished the building to prevent further vandalism, and plowed in a new barley field on the site. All the adobe ruins and the remaining trees were torn down and deposited into a barranca nearby. The Yorba cemetery closed in 1939 and thereafter vandals destroyed or stole many of the grave markers.

== Present day ==
California Historical Landmark #226 as shown in June 1961.

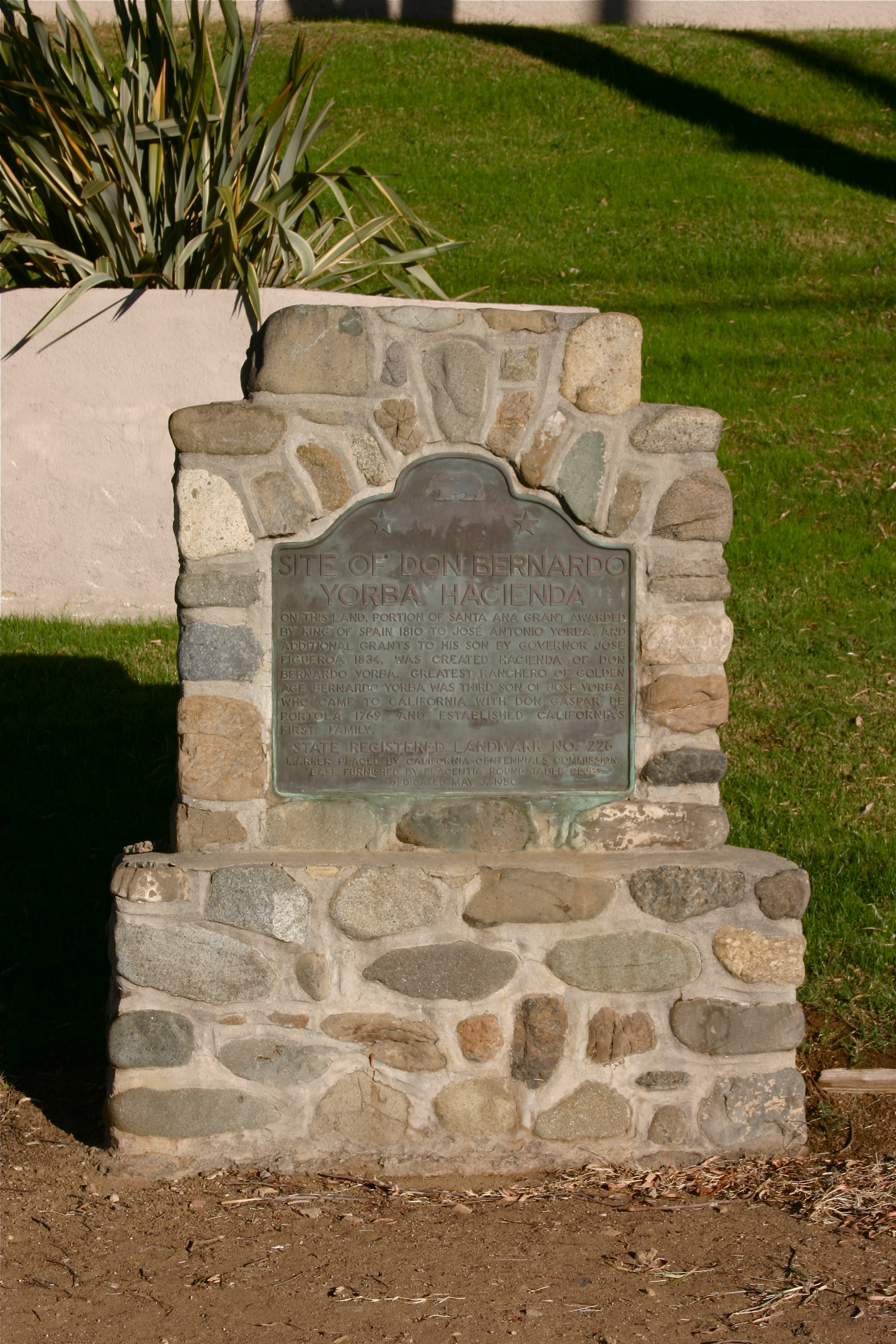
California Historical Landmark #226

The site of the hacienda is registered by the state as California Historical Landmark #226. A stone marker, placed by the California Centennials Commission and dedicated 3 May 1950, has a bronze plaque titled "Site of Don Bernardo Yorba Hacienda" which gives a brief summary of the historical background of the site. The marker faces south and is located on the northeast corner of Esperanza Road and Echo Hill Lane in Yorba Linda, at the entrance to the Fairmont Hill community. According to the plaque, the base was furnished by the Placentia Round Table Club and supposedly contains some of the original adobe bricks from the hacienda structure salvaged from the barranca where it was dumped. There are a few red bricks found on the backside, but most of the base seems to be made of large stones cemented together. The site marker is actually 55 yards northeast from the east wall of the original main structure. Based on survey reports registered with the county, the true site of this structure is parallel with the road in what is now the westbound fast lane of Esperanza road on the north side of the center divider, midway along the left turn lane opposite Echo Hill Lane.

The Yorba Cemetery, now surrounded by Woodgate Park and Woodgate Condominium Association, is the only surviving part of the Yorba Hacienda. The cemetery was deeded to the county of Orange in 1967 and is presently (2010) administered by the county parks department. Restoration efforts are underway and tours are available.

== See also ==
- Ranchos of Orange County
- Ranchos of California
- List of Ranchos of California
- California Historical Landmarks in Orange County, California
