= Friends Church (Yorba Linda) =

- Friends Church
- 33.88646°N 117.81544°W
- Location: 5091 Mountain View Ave., Yorba Linda, California 92886
- Country: United States
- Denomination: Evangelical Friends International
- Website: friends.church

History
- Founded: 1912

Friends Church (formerly Yorba Linda Friends Church) is an evangelical Christian megachurch located in the Orange County city of Yorba Linda, California, United States. The church is affiliated with the Friends Southwest Denomination.

The church has four physical buildings at Yorba Linda, Orange, Anaheim and Eastvale. In 2023, the Senior Pastor was Matthew Cork.

With weekly attendance averaging in excess of 4,000, in 2008 it was the largest Quaker church in the world and one of the largest churches in Southern California. In addition, the church's worship center (completed in 2006) is one of the largest theaters in California, with a capacity of over 3,000. In 2009, the church was ranked the 54th fastest-growing church in the United States.

== History ==
On June 4, 1911, community residents convened to plan the construction of the first church in Yorba Linda to offer Christian education to local children. In 1912, at a cost of $1,513.63, the Friends Church was organized and built on School Street. The charter members included Frank A. Nixon and Hannah M. Nixon, parents to future United States President Richard M. Nixon. The original structure is now the First Baptist Church.

The Friends Church was moved to a new location in 1928 and again in 1969. Meetings at the Friends Church took form of unprogrammed worship with spontaneous and enthusiastic displays of religious fervor, characterized by religious scholar Thomas Hamm as a landmark of California evangelicalism.

In the early twenty-first century, the church offered multilingual services and Christian education programs for all age groups. The church distanced itself from the Quaker denomination; it is much more conservative than most Quaker churches and does not espouse the pacifist views of most Quakers.

In 2008, took the name of Yorba Linda Friends Church.

The church is in partnership with several international groups including the Dalit Freedom Network and Obria Medical Clinics.

== See also ==
- John Wimber
