= Rancho Arroyo Seco (Yorba) =

Mexican land grant in California

Coordinates: 38.350°N 121.010°W

Rancho Arroyo Seco was a 48,857-acre (197.72 km^{2}) Mexican land grant in the northern San Joaquin Valley, primarily within present-day Amador County, California.

It was given in 1840 by Governor Juan B. Alvarado to Teodocio Yorba. The name means "dry creek". The grant, east of Sacramento, encompassed the historic mining community and present day town of Ione.

== History ==
Teodosio Juan Yorba (1805–1863), the son of José Antonio Yorba, was granted the eleven square league Rancho Arroyo Seco in 1840. Teodosio Yorba was also the grantee of the four square league Rancho Lomas de Santiago in southern California in 1846.

With the cession of California to the United States following the Mexican-American War, the 1848 Treaty of Guadalupe Hidalgo provided that the land grants would be honored. As required by the Land Act of 1851, a claim for Rancho Arroyo Seco was filed with the Public Land Commission in 1852, and the grant was patented to Andrés Pico in 1863.

In 1852 Yorba sold Rancho Arroyo Seco to former Mexican Alta California governor Andrés Pico.

In 1857, Andrés Pico sold Rancho Arroyo Seco to Joseph Moravia Moss, Horace Carpentier, Edward Fitzgerald Beale, and Herman Wohler in 1862.

Neither Yorba or Pico did much to improve the property, and settlers built the towns of Quincy, Muletown, Jackson Valley, and Live Oak. After the patent, in 1865-1866, two companies of US Cavalry were dispatched from Camp Union in Sacramento to evict the settlers.

== See also ==
- Ranchos of Amador County, California
- History of the San Joaquin Valley
