= Birthplace of Richard Nixon =

Historic house in California, United States

- Richard Nixon Birthplace
- U.S. National Register of Historic Places
- U.S. National Historic Landmark
- California Historical Landmark
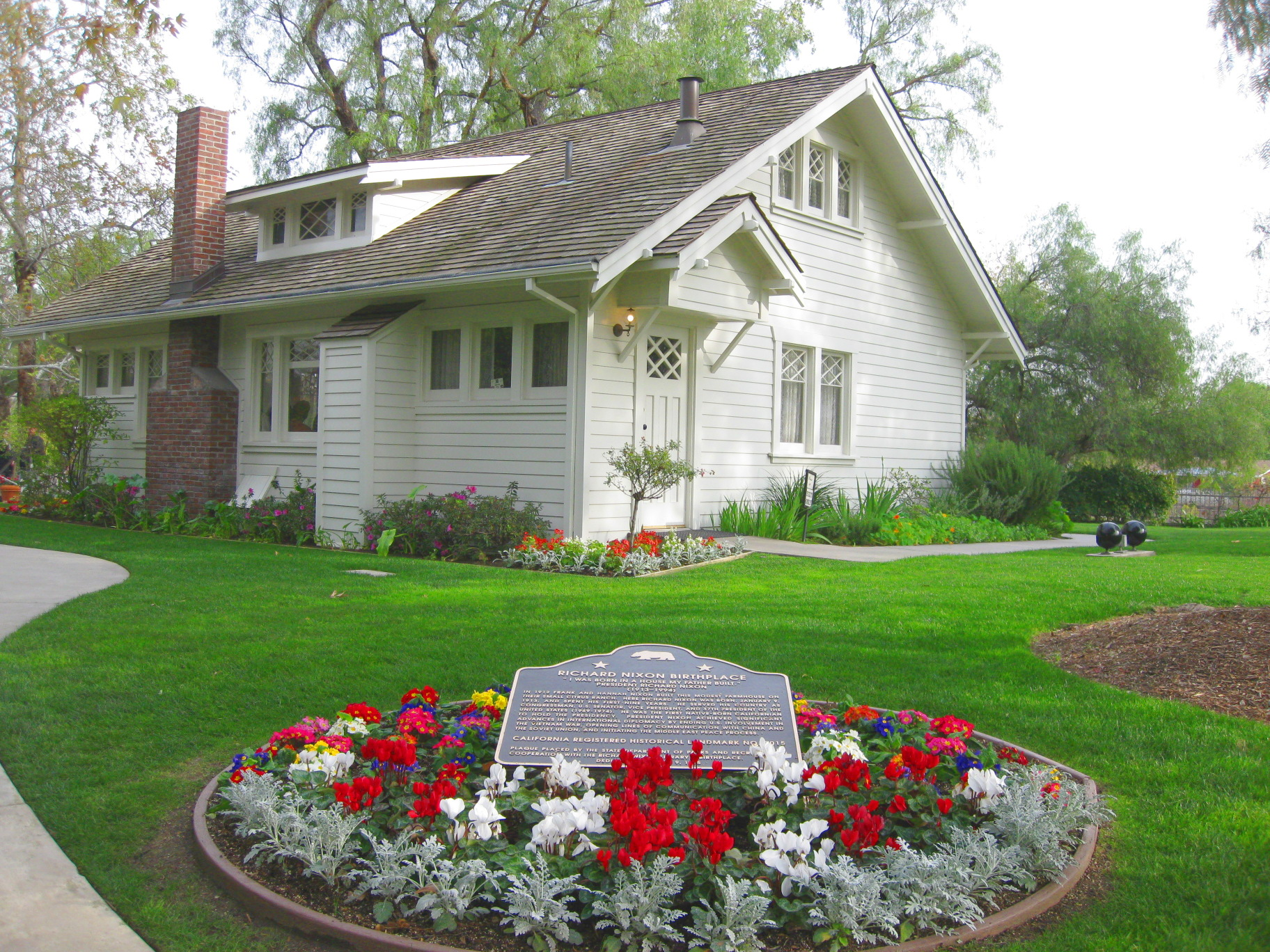

- Location within California
- Interactive map showing the location of Richard Nixon Birthplace
- Location: 18001 Yorba Linda Boulevard, Yorba Linda, Orange County, California, U.S.
- Coordinates: 33°53′22″N 117°49′5″W
- Area: 3 acres (1.2 ha) (landmarked area)
- Built: 1912
- Architectural style: California Bungalow
- NRHP reference No.: 71000171
- CHISL No.: 1015

Significant dates
- Added to NRHP: December 17, 1971
- Designated NHL: May 31, 1973
- Designated CHISL: October 1, 1994

The birthplace and early childhood home of Richard Nixon, the 37th president of the United States is located on the grounds of the Richard Nixon Presidential Library and Museum in Yorba Linda, California, and serves as a historic house museum.

The house was built in 1912 on family ranchland; Nixon was born there the following year. He and his family stayed there until 1922, when they moved to Whittier, California. The former home was designated a National Historic Landmark in 1973, and a California Historical Landmark in 1994.

== Description and history ==
The Richard Nixon Presidential Library and Museum is located on the north side of Yorba Linda Boulevard at its junction with Eureka Avenue, west of downtown Yorba Linda. The property is dominated by the museum complex and parking lot; the Birthplace is located in a slightly secluded setting east of the main building, in a grove of trees. It is a 1 1/2 story Craftsman-style bungalow, with a gabled roof and clapboarded exterior. The north roof face has a broad shed-roof dormer projecting, and a gabled hood shelters the main entrance. Some of its windows feature diamond-pane sashes or panels.

The house was built in 1912 from a mail-order construction kit by Richard’s father Francis A. Nixon, on ranchland owned by the family. Richard Nixon was born in this house the following year, and the family remained here until 1922, when they moved to Whittier. Francis Nixon sold off portions of the 8-acre (3.2 ha) property in 1922 and 1925, with the largest part going to the Yorba Linda School District for the construction of a school. The district purchased the rest of the tract in 1948, using the house as employee housing.

Nixon formed a nonprofit library organization in 1968, after winning his first election as president. The school district deeded the property over to that organization in 1988. The school was torn down, and the museum established on the premises.

== See also ==
- List of residences of presidents of the United States
- List of National Historic Landmarks in California
- National Register of Historic Places listings in Orange County, California
- Presidential memorials in the United States
