= International Student Volunteers =

Non-profit organization

- International Student Volunteers
- Abbreviation: ISV
- Formation: 2002
- Type: Non-profit, NGO
- Legal status: Dissolved
- Purpose: Humanitarian
- Headquarters: Yorba Linda, California, U.S.
- Locations: Australia, Costa Rica, New Zealand, Thailand, Dominican Republic, Bosnia, Croatia, Ecuador, South Africa
- Region served: North America, South East Asia, Oceania, Europe, South America, Southern Africa
- Students: 125,000
- Website: Official website
- Formerly called: Youth in Action

International Student Volunteers (ISV) was a non-profit organization organized in Yorba Linda, California in 2002 and dissolved in 2018. Originally founded under the name Youth in Action, it operated on a voluntary basis and provided educational and travel programs for university students. After it dissolved, a different company named International Students Volunteer Inc. was established in 2019 and dissolved in 2024.

During the original organization's years of activity over 40,000 students traveled with it, volunteering for projects in Australia, New Zealand, Costa Rica, the Dominican Republic, Romania, Croatia, Bosnia, the United States, Thailand, Ecuador, and South Africa.

== Program ==
=== Volunteer projects ===
Participants underwent a two-week program in small groups led by an ISV Project Leader, collaborating with local grassroots organizations to enhance the local environment or support community welfare.

The organization partnered with organizations like Habitat for Humanity, Conservation International, and Conservation Volunteers Australia.

Projects undertaken by ISV encompassed conservation, humanitarian efforts, or a blend of both, such as projects regarding children's education, environmental conservation, wildlife surveys, teaching English, and construction initiatives. ISV established long-term partnerships with organizations like the Wild Mountains Trust, focusing on environmental education in Australia.

=== Adventure tour ===
The program had a second component consisting of two weeks of travel, exploration, discovery, and adventure in the host country. The tours were run and operated by ISV with an ISV Tour Leader. Participants traveled through their host country, learning about its environment and culture while taking part in activities such as white water rafting, city tours, horseback riding, snorkeling, glacier treks, waterfall rappelling, and cultural shows.

=== Academic credit ===
Universities in the United States, United Kingdom, and Australia provided academic credits by an ISV Program Syllabus that the accrediting institutions approved. The educational focus was on Natural Resource Management and Sustainable Development, with an emphasis on the program's opportunities for experiential education in an international volunteer setting.

The organization was criticized by the University of Nebraska–Lincoln, who said, "[ISV] mislead students about the possibility of earning academic credit...with no sense of a university's processes or the likelihood that a student will receive credit."

ISV was selected as one of the top ten volunteer organizations in the world by the International Voluntary Service Task Force, part of the US Center for Citizen Diplomacy.

Most of ISV's participants were university students from the US, Canada, the UK, Australia, and New Zealand. The program was offered during the summer months (Northern and Southern Hemisphere summers) and consisted of two or four-week programs in selected countries. ISV also offered three-week-long high school programs for students aged 15 to 18 in Costa Rica, Thailand, the Dominican Republic, and New Zealand.

== See also ==
- Volunteer travel
