= Rancho Lomas de Santiago =

Coordinates: 33.770°N 117.790°W

Rancho Lomas de Santiago was a 47,227-acre (191 km^{2}) Mexican land grant given by Mexican governor Pío Pico to Teodosio Yorba in 1846. The name means "Hills of St. James". The rancho included parts of present-day Irvine and Tustin in what is now eastern Orange County, California.

== History ==
Teodosio Juan Yorba (1805–1863), the son of Jose Antonio Yorba grantee of Rancho Santiago de Santa Ana, was granted the eleven square league Rancho Arroyo Seco in 1840, and the four square league Rancho Lomas de Santiago in 1846.

With the cession of California to the United States following the Mexican–American War, the 1848 Treaty of Guadalupe Hidalgo provided that the land grants would be honored. As required by the Land Act of 1851, a claim for Rancho Lomas de Santiago was filed with the Public Land Commission in 1852, and the grant was patented to Teodosio Yorba in 1868.

Teodosio sold the rancho to William Wolfskill in 1860. Joseph E. Pleasants took charge of Wolfskill's new cattle operations. Already overgrazed, and largely unfarmable due to its steep, hilly terrain, the Santa Ana range could not sustain the large cattle herds. In 1866, Benjamin and Thomas Flint, Llewellyn Bixby and James Irvine acquired the rancho, and it eventually became part of the Irvine Ranch.

== Historic sites of the Rancho ==
- Wolfskill-Pleasants Cottage. In 1860 William Wolfskill acquired the Rancho Lomas de Santiago and built the first wooden house outside of Anaheim at this location for his cattle foreman, Joseph E. Pleasants, who was the pioneer settler in the Santa Ana Mountains.

== See also ==
- Ranchos of Orange County, California
- Ranchos of California
