= Yorba Linda Water District =

Water management authority in Yorba Linda, California

The Yorba Linda Water District is a public agency responsible for water supply and quality for residents of the entire city of Yorba Linda, California, approximately one third of Placentia, small portions of Brea and Anaheim, and the two unincorporated county territories that are in and adjacent to Yorba Linda, which are known as spheres of influence.

== Structure ==
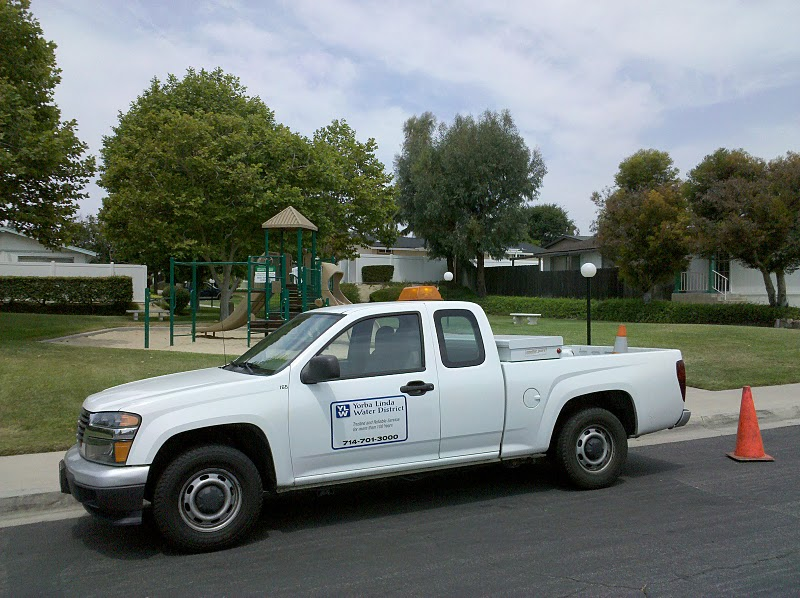
This is a typical vehicle used by meter readers.

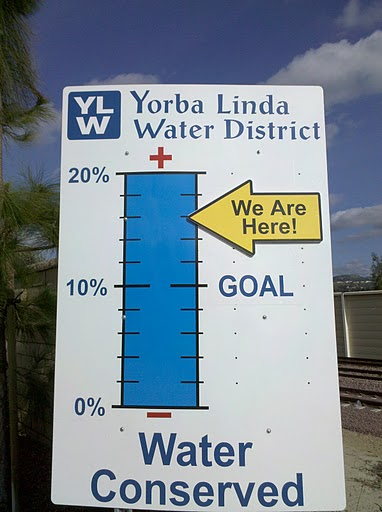
These signs were placed at various locations throughout the jurisdiction during the summer of 2009 as a result of expected shortages.

It is governed by a locally elected Board of Directors. The Directors are elected to four-year terms by the registered voters within the District and establishes policies and programs leading to the achievement of the District's mission. As of 2022, the President of the Board is J. Wayne Miller, PhD, the Vice President is Brooke Jones, and the other three members of the board are Trudi DesRoches, Phil Hawkins, and Tom Lindsey. The Yorba Linda Water District Board of Directors' meetings are held on the second and fourth Tuesdays of each month at the District office located at 1717 E. Miraloma Ave. in Placentia.

The departments operating under the general manager's direction are administration, engineering, finance, human resources, and operations.

== See also ==
- Metropolitan Water District of Southern California
- Yorba Linda, California
- Orange County, California
- Shell Oil Company
