= Olive, California =

Unincorporated community in California, United States

Olive
- Unincorporated community
- Interactive map of Olive
- Coordinates: 33°50′10″N 117°50′46″W
- Country: United States
- State: California
- County: Orange
- City: Orange
- GNIS feature ID: 246872

Olive is an unincorporated parcel of approximately 32.67 acres (132,200 m^{2}) entirely surrounded by the city of Orange, in Orange County, California, United States, located along Lincoln Avenue, between Eisenhower Park and Orange Olive Road.

== History ==
Members of the Tongva and Juaneño/Luiseño nations long inhabited this area. The village of Totpavit was located at what is now modern day Olive.

After the 1769 expedition of Gaspar de Portolà, a Spanish expedition led by Father Junipero Serra, named the area Vallejo de Santa Ana (Valley of Saint Anne). On November 1, 1776, Mission San Juan Capistrano became the area's first permanent European settlement in Alta California, New Spain.

In 1801, the Spanish Empire granted 62,500 acres (253 km^{2}) to Jose Antonio Yorba, which he named Rancho San Antonio. Yorba's great Rancho included the lands where the cities of Olive, Orange, Villa Park, Santa Ana, Tustin, Costa Mesa, and Newport Beach stand today. Smaller ranchos evolved from this large rancho including the Rancho Santiago de Santa Ana.

After the Mexican-American War, Alta California was ceded to the United States by Mexico with the signing of the Treaty of Guadalupe Hidalgo in 1848, and many Californios lost the title to their lands.

In 1875, when American settlers were considering naming the town they had founded Richland, Olive was one of the proposed names, along with Lemon, Walnut, and eventually Orange was chosen because Richland was already a city in California. When the city was named Orange, California, the other three names were assigned to streets in the new town. Orange Olive Road roughly bisects the Olive community.

== Setting ==
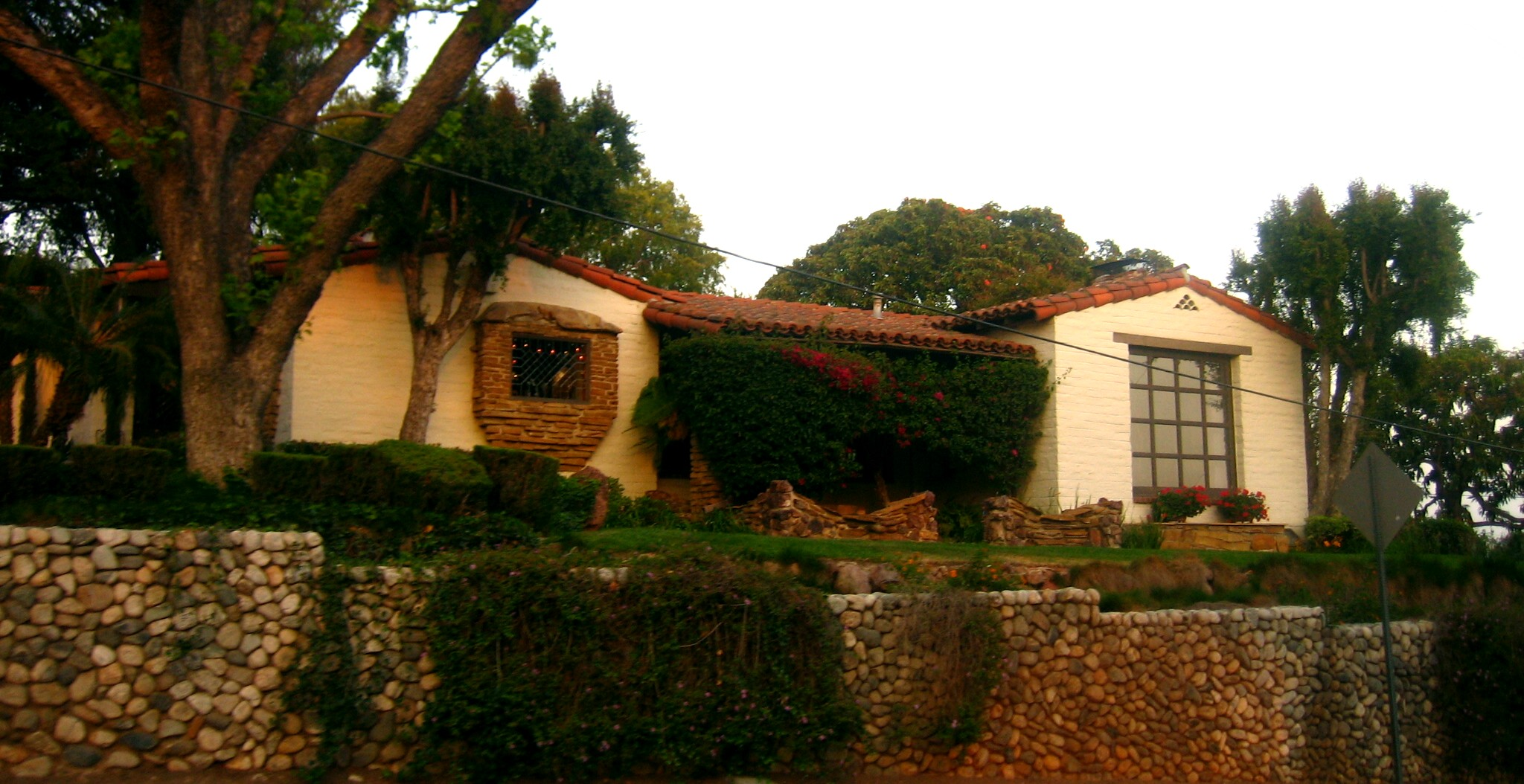
A Spanish Colonial Revival Style home in Olive

The community of Olive, California is located in the northern portion of the city of Orange and is 2 miles (3.2 km) west of Anaheim Hills. It is also in proximity to the Anaheim border. It is set on a small berm about 50 feet (15 m) which is higher than the surrounding area of land. Olive was founded in 1887 by a developer in the olive industry. Since the community's creation, many of Olive's original 63 lots have been subdivided and are now at least 1/4 acre, in keeping with county code for the area.

With 258 residents, Olive is among the smallest "island communities" in Orange County to be recognized with a name of reputation.

The area lacks sidewalks and its many pre-1930s houses are set deep on their lots. Because Olive is small in size, there is no through traffic in the community, keeping the area convenient for its residents. The only signage identifying the community is the entrance that reads "Olive Heights" at the corner of Palm and Lincoln Avenues. Students who live there attend Olive Elementary, which closed temporarily in the 1990s due to lack of student enrollment, although it now enrolls 376 students.

== Notable people ==
- Major League Baseball pitcher Russ Heman, (b. Feb 10, 1933)
- Jazz Composer/Arranger Bill Holman, (b. May 21, 1927)
