= Rancho Cañón de Santa Ana =

1834 Mexican land grant in Orange County, California

- Mexican land grant
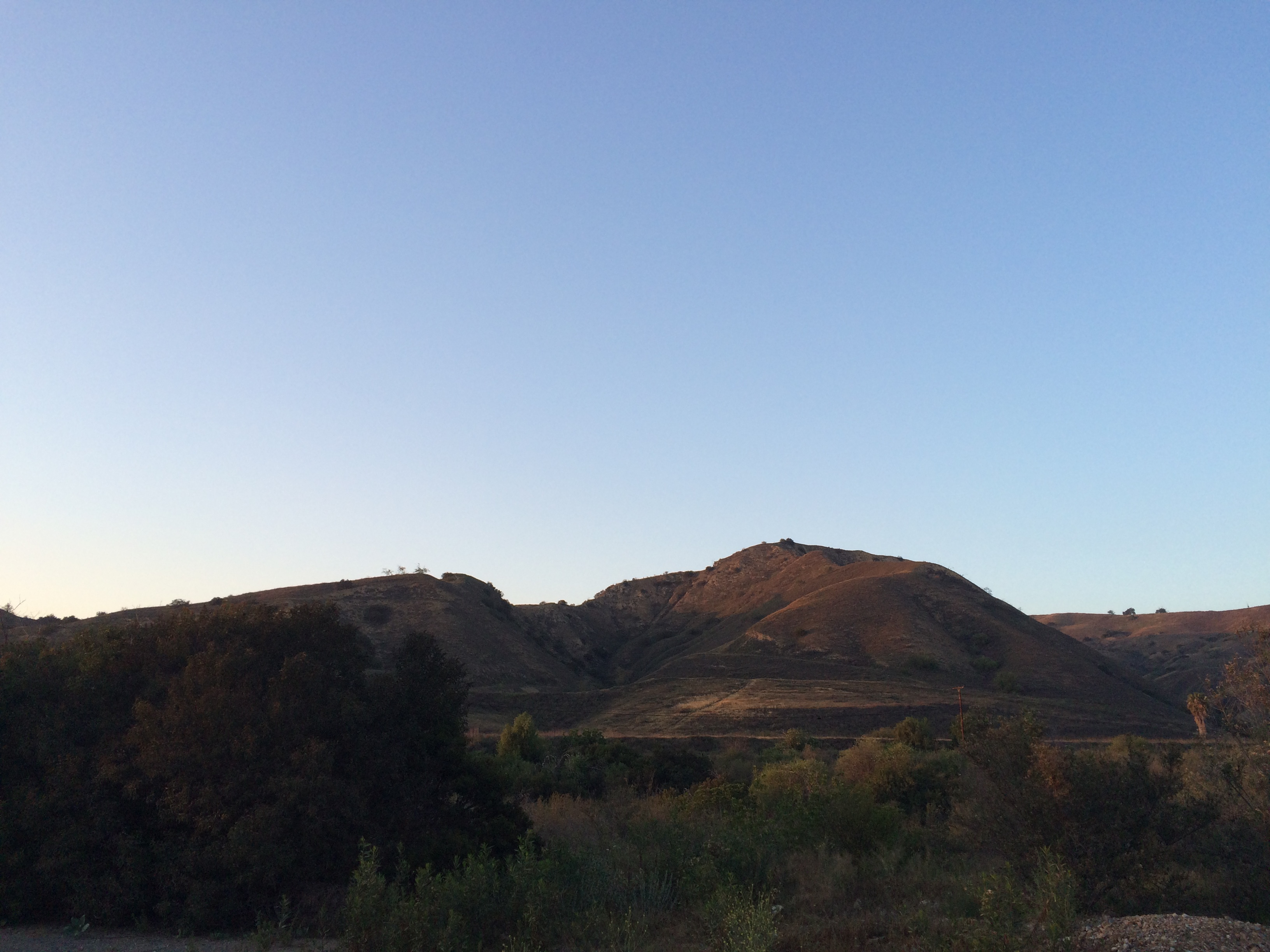
- Orange County
- Interactive map of Rancho Cañón de Santa Ana
- Coordinates: 33.920°N 117.820°W
- Country: United States
- State: California
- County: Orange
- Granted: 1834
- Patented: 1866
- Founder: Bernardo Yorba (grantee)

Government
  - Grantor: José Figueroa

Area
  - Total: 20.83 sq mi (53.94 km^{2})

Rancho Cañón de Santa Ana was a 13,328-acre (53.94 km^{2}) land grant in present-day Orange County, California, given by Mexican governor José Figueroa in 1834 to Bernardo Yorba. The name means "Canyon of Santa Ana". The grant included present-day Yorba Linda.

== History ==
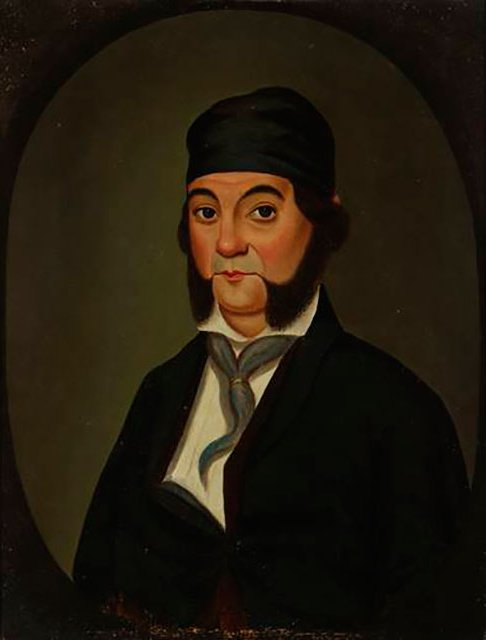
Don Bernardo Yorba, a wealthy Californio ranchero, was granted Rancho Cañón de Santa Ana in 1836.

Bernardo Yorba (1800–1858) was the son of José Antonio Yorba, the grantee of Rancho Santiago de Santa Ana. For years, Bernardo and his brothers pastured animals on lands north of their father's rancho, and in 1834 Bernardo requested, and was granted, Rancho Cañón de Santa Ana. Yorba continued to pasture lands even further east, and in 1846, Bernardo was granted Rancho La Sierra.

With the cession of California to the United States following the Mexican–American War, the 1848 Treaty of Guadalupe Hidalgo provided that the land grants would be honored. As required by the Land Act of 1851, a claim for Rancho Cañón de Santa Ana was filed with the Public Land Commission in 1852, and the grant was patented to Bernardo Yorba in 1866.

In the early 1860s, Leonardo Cota, who was married to Maria Ynez Yorba, a daughter of Bernardo Yorba, borrowed money from Abel Stearns, using his share of the rancho as collateral. When Cota defaulted in 1866, Stearns filed a lawsuit to demand a partition of the land, so that Stearns could claim Cota's section. Two Los Angeles lawyers involved in the lawsuit were Alfred Chapman and Andrew Glassell, who took some of their fees in land.

== Historic sites of the Rancho ==
- Yorba Hacienda
