= Yorba Linda, California =

City in California, United States

- City
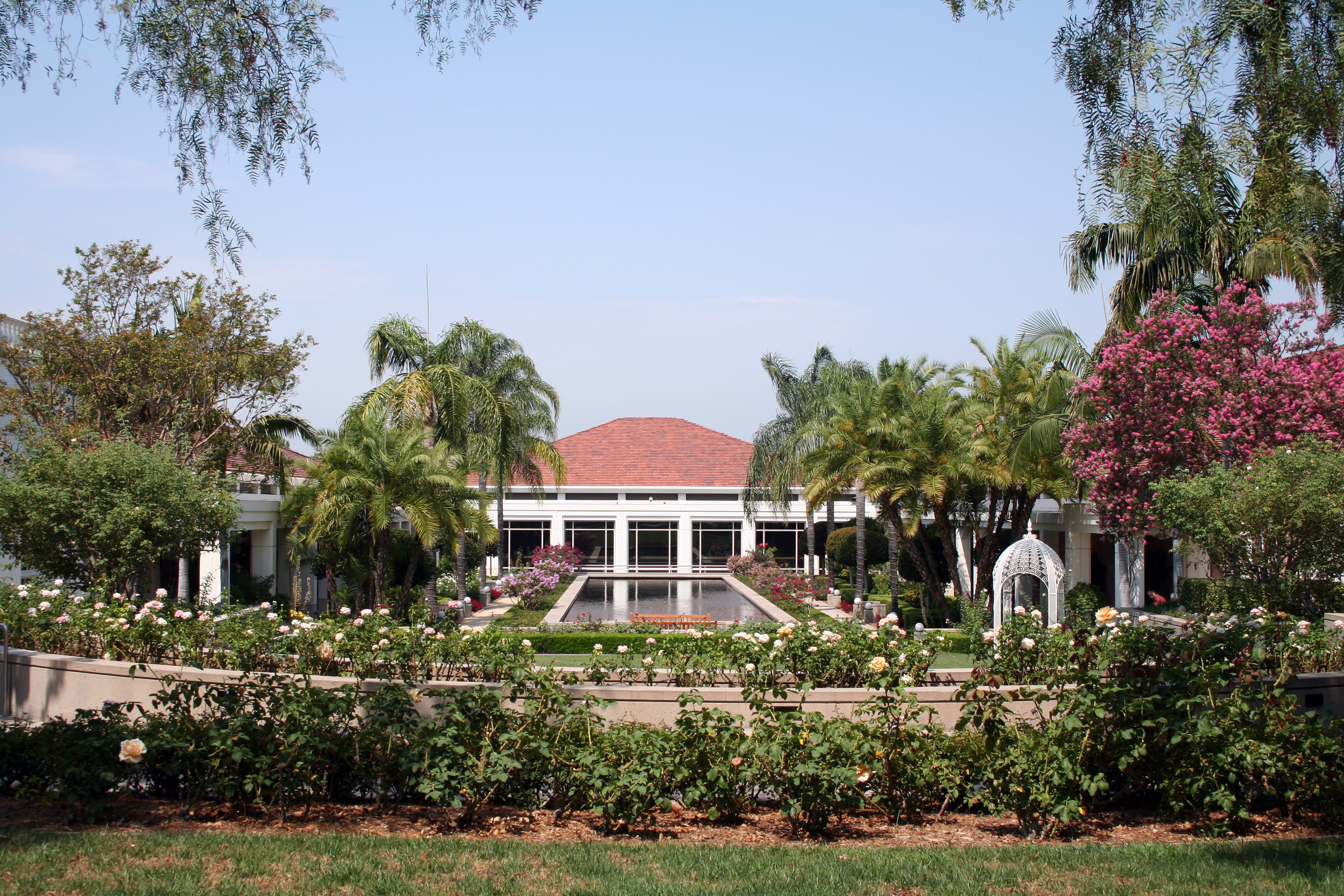
- Nixon Library and Gardens (2006)

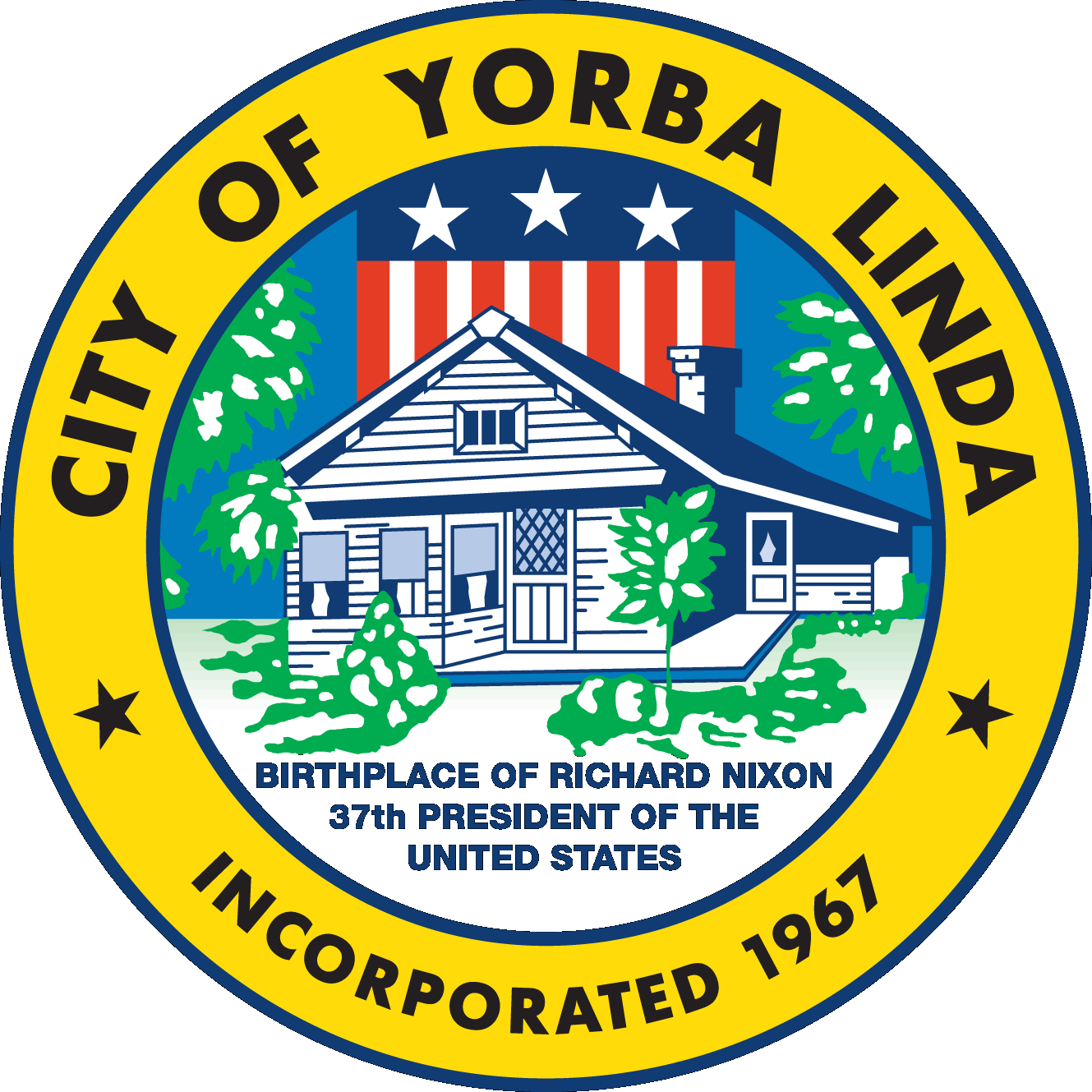
- Flag Seal
- Motto: Land of Gracious Living
- Interactive map of Yorba Linda, California
- Coordinates: 33.889°N 117.813°W
- Country: United States
- State: California
- County: Orange
- Incorporated: November 2, 1967

Government
  - Type: Council-Manager
  - Mayor: Carlos Rodriguez
  - Mayor Pro Tem: Peggy Huang
  - City Council: Tara Campbell; Janice Lim; Shivinder Singh
  - City Manager: Peter Grant

Area
  - Total: 19.97 sq mi (51.73 km^{2})
  - Land: 19.95 sq mi (51.68 km^{2})
  - Water: 0.019 sq mi (0.05 km^{2}) 0.10%
- Elevation: 381 ft (116 m)

Population (2020)
  - Total: 68,336
  - Density: 3,425/sq mi (1,322/km^{2})
- Demonym: Yorba Lindan
- Time zone: UTC−8 (Pacific)
  - Summer (DST): UTC−7 (PDT)
- ZIP codes: 92885-92887
- Area codes: 657/714
- FIPS code: 06-86832
- GNIS feature IDs: 1652817, 2412321
- Website: yorbalindaca.gov

Yorba Linda (/ˈjɔːrbə ˈlɪndə/, YOR-buh LIN-duh) is a suburban city in northeastern Orange County, California, United States, with the city hall approximately 27 miles (43 km) southeast of downtown Los Angeles. It is part of the Los Angeles metropolitan area, and had a population of 68,336 at the 2020 census.

Yorba Linda is known for its connection to Richard Nixon, the 37th president of the United States. His birthplace is a National Historic Landmark, and his presidential library and museum are also located in the city.

== Etymology ==
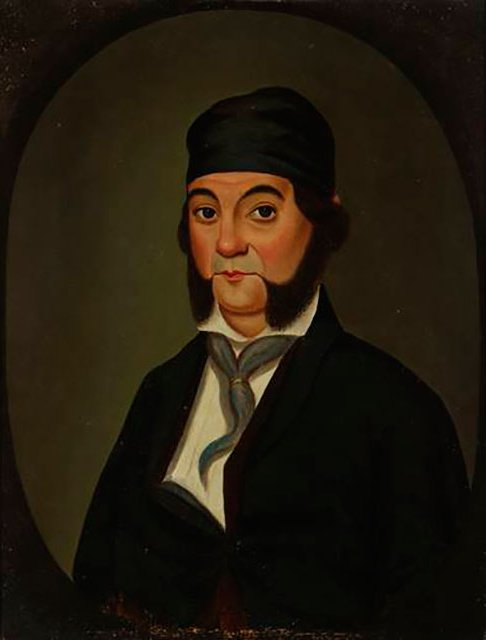
Yorba Linda is named after Don Bernardo Yorba, noted Californio figure in early 19th century California.

Yorba Linda is named after Don Bernardo Yorba, a Californio ranchero who historically owned the area, combined with linda, Spanish for beautiful. The name was created in 1908 by the Janss Investment Company.

== History ==
=== Pre-history ===
The area is the home of the Tongva, Luiseño, and Juaneño tribal nations, who were there "as early as 4,000 years ago." The Tongva defined their world as Tovaangar, a nation which "extended from Palos Verdes to San Bernardino, from Saddleback Mountain to the San Fernando Valley" and included the entire territory of present-day Yorba Linda. Along with Western civilization, Spanish colonization between 1769 and 1840 brought disease, non-native species, and commercial livestock into the area, which dramatically altered the ecological balance of the region and caused the Tongva to resettle around three Catholic missions. The village of Hutuknga was located in the area of Yorba Linda.

=== Early years ===
In 1810, the Spanish Crown granted José Antonio Yorba 63,414 acres of land, which spread across much of modern-day Orange County. In 1834, following Mexico's independence from Spain, Yorba's most successful son, Bernardo Yorba (after whom the city would later be named), was granted the 13,328-acre (53.94 km^{2}) Rancho Cañón de Santa Ana by Mexican governor José Figueroa. Most of this original land was retained after the Mexican–American War in 1848 by descendants of the Yorba family. A portion of the city's land is still owned and developed by descendants of Samuel Kraemer, who acquired it through his 1886 marriage to Angelina Yorba, the great-granddaughter of Bernardo Yorba. The site of the Bernardo Yorba Hacienda, referred to as the Don Bernardo Yorba Ranch House Site, is listed as a California Historical Landmark.

Near that same site sits the second oldest private cemetery in the county, the historic Yorba Cemetery. The land was given to the Roman Catholic Archdiocese of Los Angeles by Bernardo Yorba in 1858 since Orange County was not established out of Los Angeles County as a separate county until 1889. The cemetery closed in 1939 and was subsequently vandalized; however, in the 1960s, the Orange County Board of Supervisors took possession of the property to repair the damage, and tours are now available one day per month.

=== Agricultural era ===
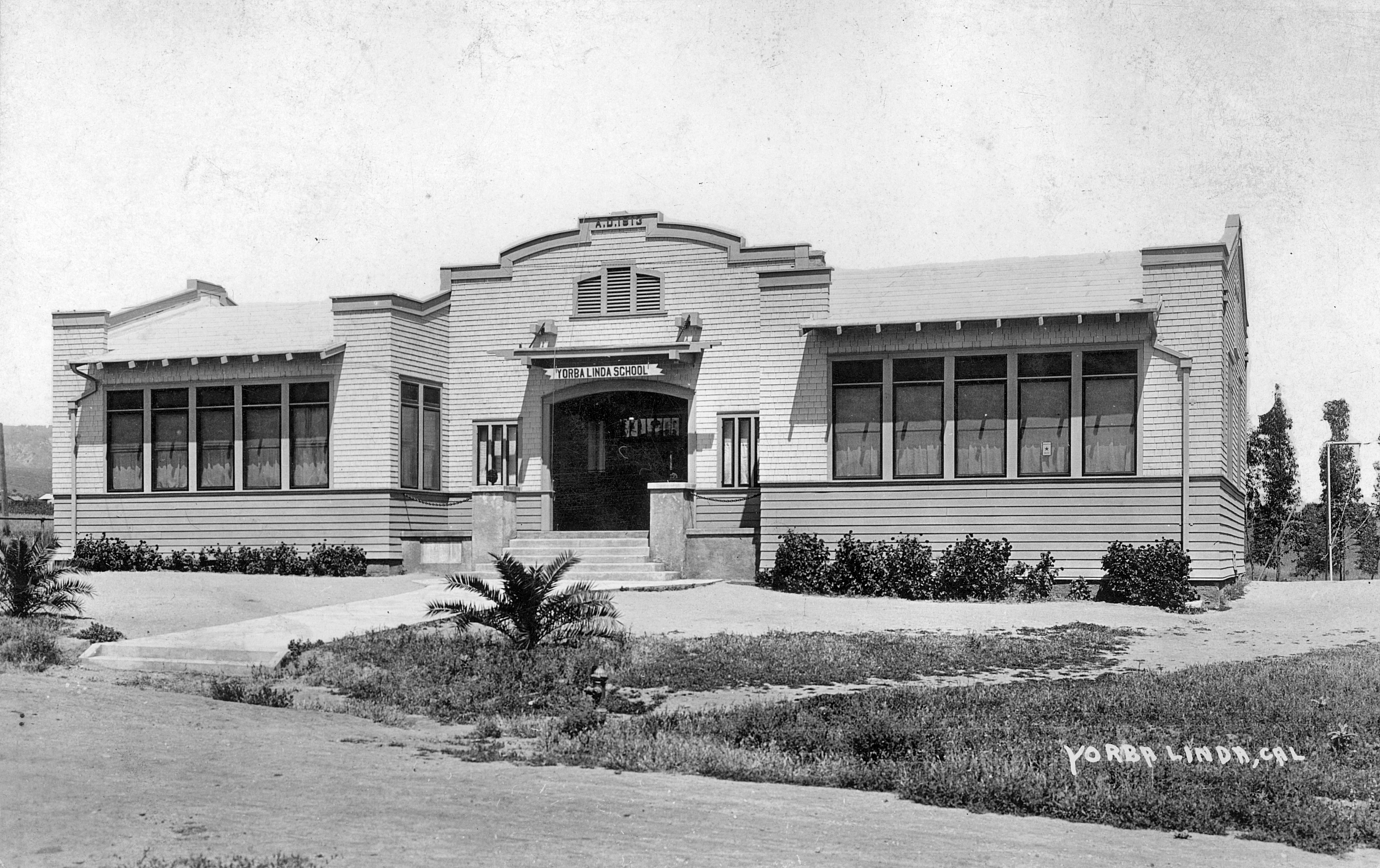
Yorba Linda School, built 1913. c. 1918

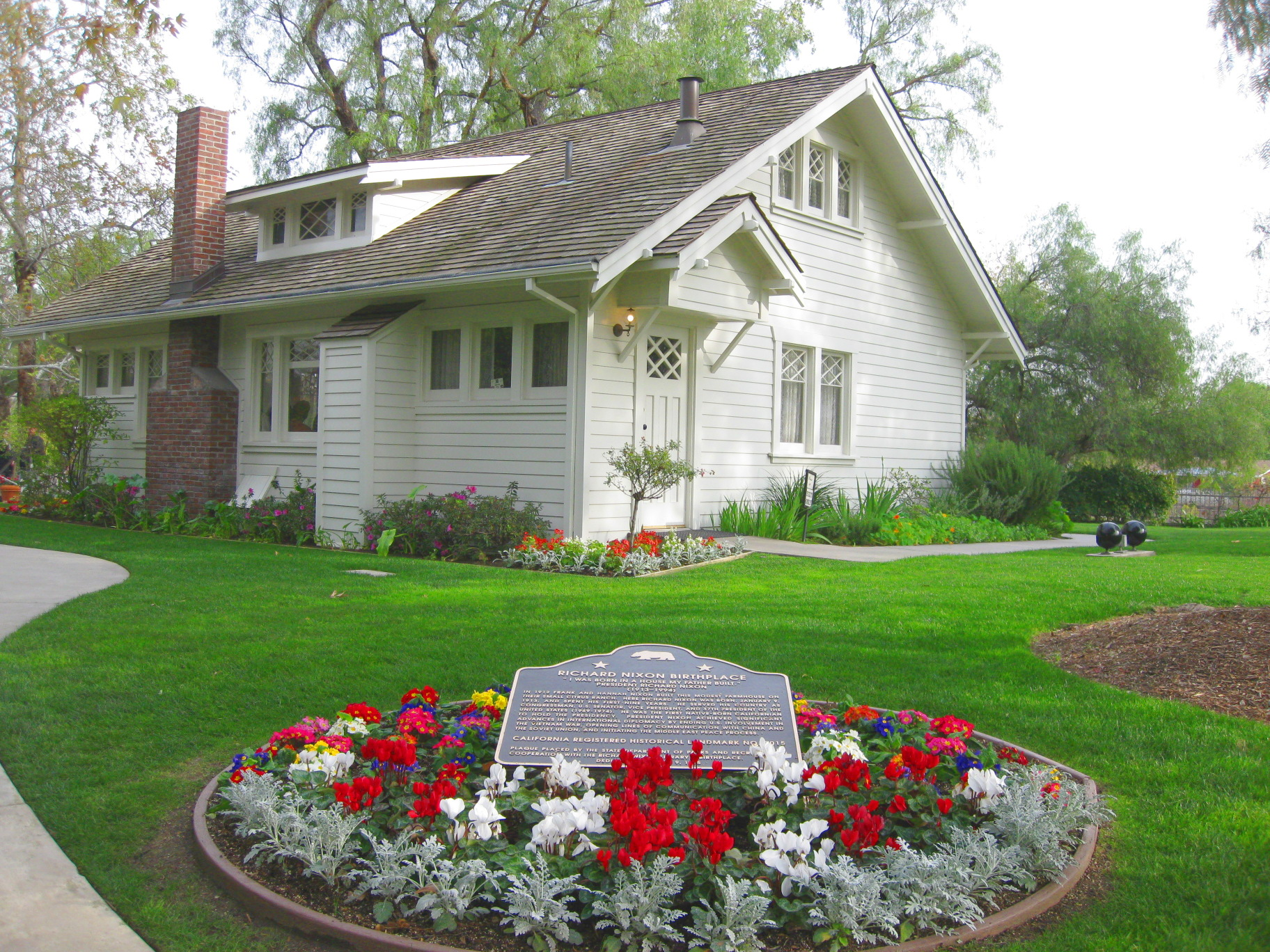
The birthplace of Richard Nixon

A section of the land was sold in 1907 by the Yorba family to Fullerton businessman Jacob Stern, who used the land for barley fields and sheep grazing. Stern subsequently sold the tract to the Janss Investment Company, which first called the area Yorba Linda, and proceeded to subdivide the land and sell it for agriculture and manufacturing. In 1910, with area population still under 50, the first of many lemon and orange groves were planted. A year later, The Pacific Telephone & Telegraph Company began serving Yorba Linda, and the first school! was constructed.

In 1912, Yorba Linda received its first post office; the Yorba Linda Citrus Association was founded; the Southern California Edison Company began providing electricity; the first church was constructed, and the area that would later become downtown was connected to Los Angeles by the Pacific Electric Railway, primarily for citrus transport.

In 1913, Richard Nixon was born in Yorba Linda, the chamber of commerce was set up, a library opened as part of the school, and avocado trees were first planted. A year later, a separate district was established for the library system.

In 1915, the Susanna Bixby Bryant Ranch house was constructed, today a public museum.

In 1917, Yorba Linda Boulevard was paved, the area's first, and the Yorba Linda Star began publication. It has since become an online section of the OC Register. A printed version of the Star is available at various city buildings free of charge and is delivered to every household in Yorba Linda each Thursday. Past articles are on microfilm at the Yorba Linda Public Library.

The population exceeded 300 for the first time prior to 1920. In 1929, the citrus association's wooden packing house burned down. It reopened the next year. During this period, the eastern two-thirds of Yorba Linda (east of the Yorba Linda Country Club) remained part of cattle and agricultural ranches controlled by pioneer families such as the Yorba, de los Reyes, Kraemer, Travis, Dominguez, Friend, and Bryant ranches.

From 1943 to 1958, "approximately seventy thousand braceros were transported to Orange County," used by employers to service citrus crops. Braceros lived in temporary housing projects referred to as "camps," which were policed by local deputies throughout the county. The townspeople of Yorba Linda "refused to allow the housing of braceros in their city, forcing the nearby town of Placentia to board them within the segregated Mexican colonia."

=== Population growth ===
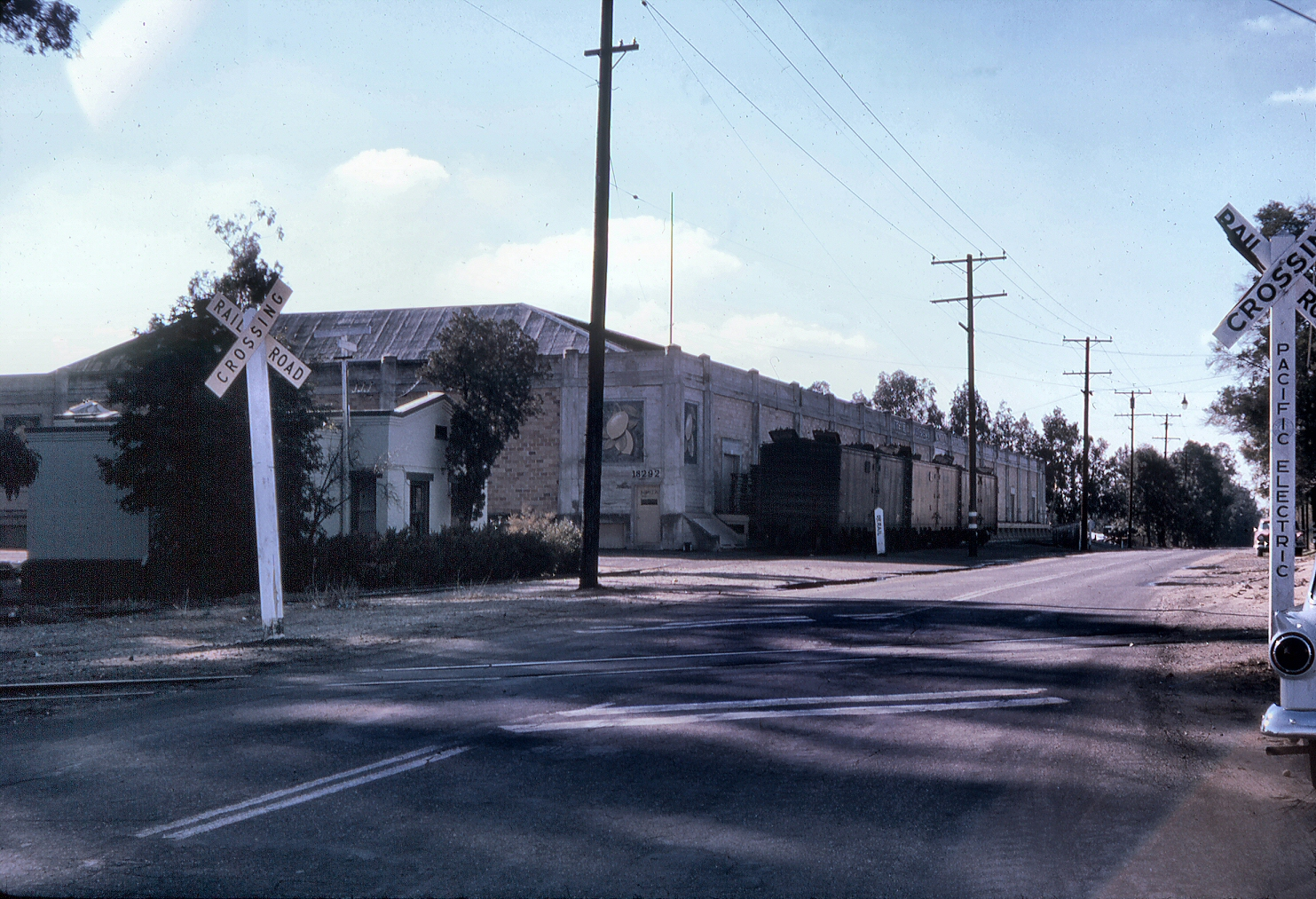
Sunkist citrus packing house, 1961

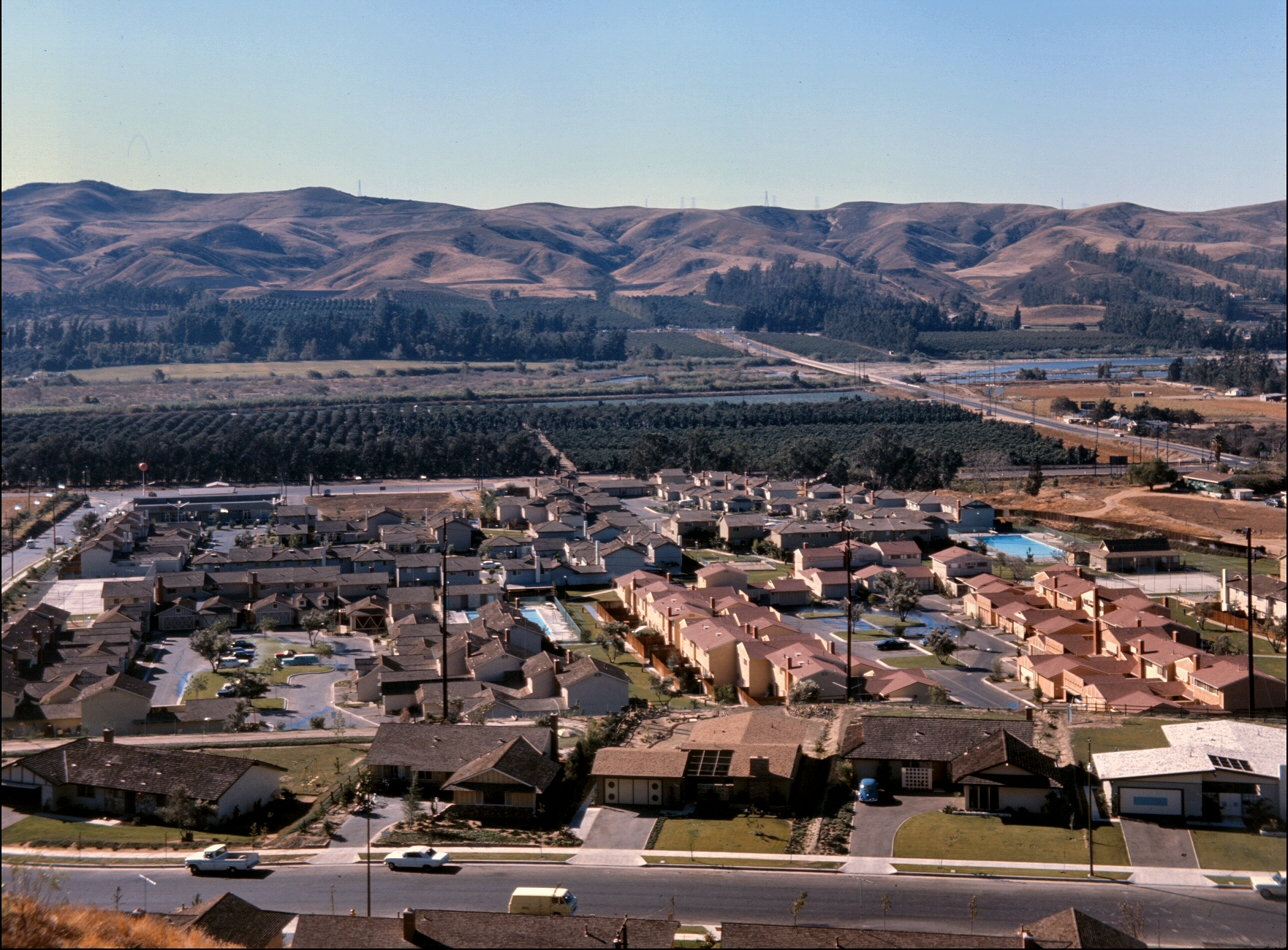
This housing development in 1966 was the result of a population increase in the 1960s, from 1,198 people in 1960 to 11,856 in 1970.

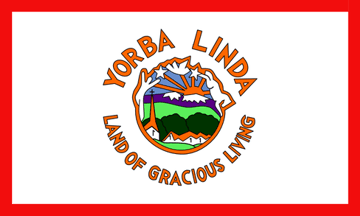
Yorba Linda's city flag from 1981 to 2021.

The small town had grown significantly by the 1960s, with more than 1,000 residents by the 1960 census. Three annexation attempts were made by adjoining cities: Brea in 1958 and Anaheim and Placentia in 1963. These experiences culminated in incorporation, which occurred in 1967.

The new city implemented a municipal general plan in 1972. By the 1980 census, the population was nearing 30,000. Within ten years it exceeded 50,000.

In 1990, the Richard Nixon Presidential Library and Museum opened as a privately owned, public museum and research library with ceremonies that included a joint appearance by Presidents Richard Nixon, Gerald Ford, Ronald Reagan and George H. W. Bush. The campus included the Birthplace of Richard Nixon. The facility would later join the presidential library system. In 1994, the community center opened.

With over 20,000 housing units in the city as of 2016, many residents now oppose further urban development and have organized to reduce traffic congestion. The Yorba Linda Preservation Foundation seeks to protect historical buildings in the city.

=== Post 2008 ===
In November 2008, eastern Yorba Linda suffered from fires that destroyed 113 homes and damaged 50 others. The destruction was due largely to erratic winds causing embers to fly up to half a mile away.

On February 3, 2019, at approximately 1:45 pm, a twin engine 1981 Cessna (N414RS) on route from Fullerton Municipal Airport to Nevada crashed from roughly 7,500 ft into a single family residence in the 19700 block of Crestknoll Drive near Glenknoll Elementary School. The pilot (75-year-old Antonio Pastini) and four individuals in the residence were killed.

In October of the heightened 2020 California wildfires, fires destroyed one home and damaged ten others in the Yorba Linda area. Initially a brush fire, the Blue Ridge Fire quickly spread to 13,964 acres before being doused on November 11, 2020.

== Geography ==
According to the United States Census Bureau, the city has a total area of 19.97 square miles (51.7 km^{2}). 19.95 square miles (51.7 km^{2}) of which is land and 0.02 square miles (0.052 km^{2}) (0.10%), water.

It has two ZIP codes, 92886 and 92887, covering approximately the western and eastern portions of the city, respectively. A third, 92885, exists exclusively for PO Boxes. The city is served by area codes 657 and 714 in a geographical overlay situation, in which 714 numbers were running out, so that 657 numbers are now also being issued in the same area. Eleven-digit dialing is therefore now required for local calls.

It is bordered by Anaheim on the south, Placentia on the west and southwest, Brea on the northwest, Chino Hills State Park on the north, and Corona on the east.

The two nearest seismic faults are the Whittier Fault and the Chino Fault, both of which are part of the Elsinore Fault Zone.

=== Climate ===
The city receives 14 inches (360 mm) to 15 inches (380 mm) of rain per year on average. The average temperatures in January and July are 55 °F (13 °C) and 71 °F (22 °C), respectively, with the overall average for the year at 63 °F (17 °C). Humidity, likewise respectively, is 52%, 60%, and 56% on average. Yorba Linda is in a Mediterranean climate (Csa).

Climate data for Yorba Linda, California
Month	Jan	Feb	Mar	Apr	May	Jun	Jul	Aug	Sep	Oct	Nov	Dec	Year
Mean daily maximum °F (°C)	71 (22)	71 (22)	73 (23)	76 (24)	78 (26)	81 (27)	87 (31)	89 (32)	87 (31)	82 (28)	76 (24)	70 (21)	78 (26)
Mean daily minimum °F (°C)	48 (9)	48 (9)	51 (11)	53 (12)	57 (14)	61 (16)	65 (18)	65 (18)	63 (17)	58 (14)	52 (11)	47 (8)	56 (13)
Average precipitation inches (mm)	2.86 (73)	3.18 (81)	1.90 (48)	0.80 (20)	0.28 (7.1)	0.10 (2.5)	0.03 (0.76)	0.01 (0.25)	0.25 (6.4)	0.72 (18)	1.38 (35)	2.02 (51)	13.53 (343.01)

== Demographics ==
Historical population
Census	Pop.	Note	%±
1960	1,198		—
1970	11,856		889.6%
1980	28,254		138.3%
1990	52,422		85.5%
2000	58,918		12.4%
2010	64,234		9.0%
2020	68,336		6.4%
U.S. Decennial Census; 1860–1870 1880-1890; 1900 1910 1920; 1930 1940 1950; 1960 1970 1980; 1990 2000 2010; 2020

Yorba Linda first appeared as a city in the 1960 U.S. census. Prior to that, the area was part of unincorporated Orange Township.

=== Racial and ethnic composition ===
Yorba Linda city, California – Racial and ethnic composition Note: the US Census treats Hispanic/Latino as an ethnic category. This table excludes Latinos from the racial categories and assigns them to a separate category. Hispanics/Latinos may be of any race.
Race / Ethnicity (NH = Non-Hispanic)	Pop 1980	Pop 1990	Pop 2000	Pop 2010	Pop 2020	% 1980	% 1990	% 2000	% 2010	% 2020
White alone (NH)	24,547	41,512	44,071	42,183	36,022	86.88%	79.19%	74.80%	65.67%	52.71%
Black or African American alone (NH)	117	551	638	789	786	0.41%	1.05%	1.08%	1.23%	1.15%
Native American or Alaska Native alone (NH)	172	164	139	120	100	0.61%	0.31%	0.24%	0.19%	0.15%
Asian alone (NH)	1,029	5,200	6,502	9,957	15,570	3.64%	9.92%	11.04%	15.50%	22.78%
Native Hawaiian or Pacific Islander alone (NH)	1,029	5,200	50	78	63	3.64%	9.92%	0.08%	0.12%	0.09%
Other race alone (NH)	58	47	138	152	374	0.21%	0.09%	0.23%	0.24%	0.55%
Mixed race or Multiracial (NH)	x	x	1,336	1,735	3,152	x	x	2.27%	2.70%	4.61%
Hispanic or Latino (any race)	2,331	4,948	6,044	9,220	12,269	8.25%	9.44%	10.26%	14.35%	17.95%
Total	28,254	52,422	58,918	64,234	68,336	100.00%	100.00%	100.00%	100.00%	100.00%

=== 2020 census ===
As of the 2020 census, Yorba Linda had a population of 68,336. The population density was 3,424.7 inhabitants per square mile (1,322.3/km^{2}). The racial makeup was 39,031 (57.1%) White, 836 (1.2%) Black or African American, 315 (0.5%) American Indian and Alaska Native, 15,746 (23.0%) Asian, 82 (0.1%) Native Hawaiian and Other Pacific Islander, 3,387 (5.0%) from some other race, and 8,939 (13.1%) from two or more races. Hispanic or Latino residents of any race were 12,269 (18.0%) of the population.

The census reported that 99.3% of the population lived in households, 0.2% lived in non-institutionalized group quarters, and 0.5% were institutionalized. 99.9% of residents lived in urban areas, while 0.1% lived in rural areas.

There were 23,083 households, out of which 35.0% included children under the age of 18, 68.3% were married-couple households, 3.1% were cohabiting couple households, 19.0% had a female householder with no spouse or partner present, and 9.5% had a male householder with no spouse or partner present. 14.2% of households were one person, and 8.4% were one person aged 65 or older. The average household size was 2.94. There were 18,974 families (82.2% of all households).

The age distribution was 21.5% under the age of 18, 8.4% aged 18 to 24, 20.5% aged 25 to 44, 29.8% aged 45 to 64, and 19.8% who were 65 years of age or older. The median age was 44.7 years. For every 100 females, there were 94.0 males, and for every 100 females age 18 and over, there were 91.7 males age 18 and over.

There were 23,685 housing units at an average density of 1,187.0 units per square mile (458.3 units/km^{2}), of which 23,083 (97.5%) were occupied. Of occupied units, 82.6% were owner-occupied and 17.4% were occupied by renters. Of all housing units, 2.5% were vacant. The homeowner vacancy rate was 0.8% and the rental vacancy rate was 4.0%.

=== 2023 ACS estimates ===
In 2023, the US Census Bureau estimated that the median household income was $152,060, and the per capita income was $67,109. About 4.9% of families and 5.6% of the population were below the poverty line.

=== 2010 census ===
The 2010 United States census reported that Yorba Linda had a population of 65,237.

The population density was 3,208.8 inhabitants per square mile (1,238.9/km^{2}).

The racial makeup of Yorba Linda was:

- 48,246 (75.1%) White (65.7% Non-Hispanic White, 9.4% White Hispanic)
- 10,030 (15.6%) Asian
- 9,220 (14.4%) Hispanic or Latino of any race
- 835 (1.3%) African American
- 230 (0.4%) Native American
- 85 (0.1%) Pacific Islander
- 2,256 (3.5%) from other races
- 2,552 (4.0%) from two or more races.

The Census reported that 64,044 people (99.7% of the population) lived in households, 97 (0.2%) lived in non-institutionalized group quarters, and 93 (0.1%) were institutionalized.

There were 21,576 households, out of which 8,535 (39.6%) had children under the age of 18 living in them, 15,102 (70.0%) were opposite-sex married couples living together, 1,844 (8.5%) had a female householder with no husband present, 758 (3.5%) had a male householder with no wife present. There were 554 (2.6%) unmarried opposite-sex partnerships, and 101 (0.5%) same-sex married couples or partnerships. 3,119 households (14.5%) were made up of individuals, and 1,515 (7.0%) had someone living alone who was 65 years of age or older. The average household size was 2.97. There were 17,704 families (82.1% of all households); the average family size was 3.29.

There were 15,792 residents (24.6%) under the age of 18, 5,574 (8.7%) aged 18 to 24, 13,848 (21.6%) aged 25 to 44, 21,414 (33.3%) aged 45 to 64, and 7,606 (11.8%) who were 65 years of age or older. The median age was 41.7 years. For every 100 females, there were 94.8 males. For every 100 females age 18 and over, there were 92.2 males.

There were 22,305 housing units at an average density of 1,114.2 per square mile (430.2/km^{2}), of which 18,108 (83.9%) were owner-occupied, and 3,468 (16.1%) were occupied by renters. The homeowner vacancy rate was 1.2%; the rental vacancy rate was 4.0%. 54,464 people (84.8% of the population) lived in owner-occupied housing units and 9,580 people (14.9%) lived in rental housing units.

During 2009–2013, Yorba Linda had a median household income of $112,259, with 3.1% of the population living below the federal poverty line.

== Economy ==
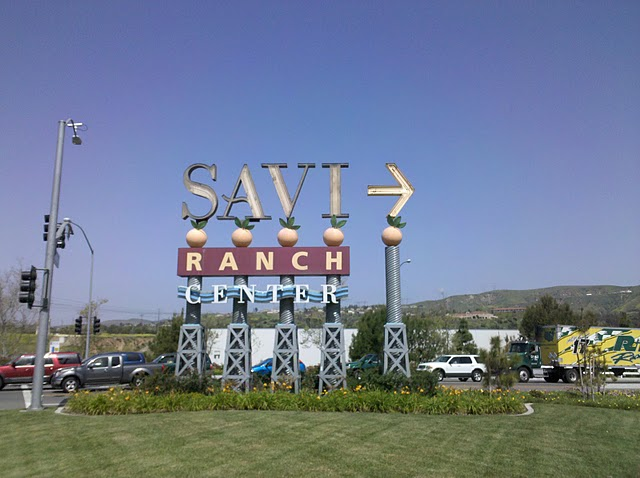
The original Savi Ranch sign, since replaced a Spanish style sign

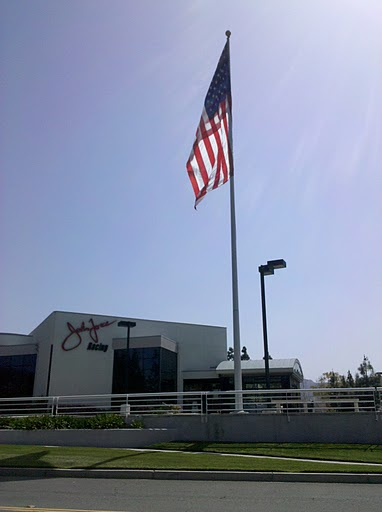
The John Force Race Station, located in Savi Ranch

The primary commercial district in Yorba Linda is Savi Ranch.

Smaller shopping centers in the city include:

- Eastlake Village Shopping Center
- Mercado del Rio
- Packing House Square
- Yorba Linda Station Plaza
- Country Club Village

In 2016, construction began on the Yorba Linda Town Center, a 125,000-square-foot shopping and dining center on the corner of Yorba Linda Boulevard and Imperial Highway, featuring Bristol Farms as an anchor tenant. The shopping center opened in April 2019.

There are over 1,000 businesses in the city, not including an additional 1,500 home-based businesses. The city also owns Black Gold Golf Club. Non-profit charities based in Yorba Linda include International Student Volunteers and STEMpowerment Inc.

=== Savi Ranch ===
Savi Ranch is an acronym of Santa Ana Valley Irrigation, an early water company. Savi Ranch today contains retailers, auto dealers, restaurants, hotels, and office buildings.

Originally, the city pursued construction of an auto mall on the entire Savi Ranch site. The original plan was rejected by residents in favor of a combination of retail stores, restaurants, hotels, and office buildings

As a significant source of sales tax revenue to Yorba Linda and as one of the first anchor tenants (along with Best Buy), The Home Depot became a political talking point in its own right, due to the geography that divides Savi Ranch into two sections, the larger east side falling within Yorba Linda's city limits, and the west side where Home Depot is situated falling within the adjacent city of Anaheim boundaries.

Also located in the Yorba Linda side of Savi Ranch is the headquarters of John Force Racing, housing operations & hosting displays of legendary 16-time NHRA Funny Car Champion John Force, his team of drivers, and their cars.

=== Top employers ===
According to the city's 2024 Annual Comprehensive Financial Report, the top employers in the city are:

#	Employer	# of employees
1	Costco	298
2	Bayshire Yorba Linda	177
2	Nobel Biocare	177
4	Euroline Steel Windows	153
5	Beverage Visions, LLC	130
6	Friends Church Yorba Linda	125
7	Coldwell Banker	118
8	So CA Permanente Medical Group	108
9	Office Solutions Business	107
10	Vons Grocery Co #3069	101

== Arts and culture ==
The Library Commission, founded in 1913, operates the Yorba Linda Library. A new library was opened in 1960. The library has several special collections, including a seed saving collection.

A Cultural Arts Center opened in 2020.

The Yorba Linda Spotlight Theater Company is a nonprofit theater organization for youth.

== Parks and recreation ==
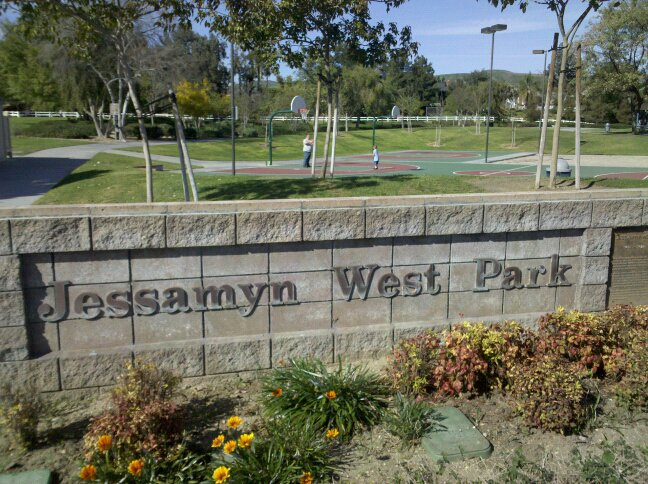
Jessamyn West Park

Yorba Linda has a history of equestrianism with 30 horse trails totaling over 100 miles. As of August 2013, there are plans to construct public stables.

== Government ==
Yorba Linda was, at one point in time, California's most conservative large community, as measured by the proportion of conservative to liberal voters. Although Democrats have been making inroads in Orange County as a whole, as well as the city itself, Yorba Linda is still one of the most consistently Republican cities in the county and state as a whole. Every GOP candidate for president since the city's incorporation in 1967 has received over 52% of the vote in the city.

As of February 2020, the California Secretary of State reported that Yorba Linda had 43,989 registered voters; of those, 10,413 (23.67%) are registered Democrats, 22,025 (50.07%) are registered Republicans, and 9,604 (21.83%) have stated no political party preference. The city voted for California Proposition 8 by 65.8% and for Proposition 4 by 59.3%, displaying a socially conservative bent. Yorba Linda was one of just three Californian cities to pass a measure in their city council proclaiming its support for the Arizona immigration law, SB1070.

Yorba Linda city vote by party in presidential elections
Year	Democratic	Republican	Third Parties
2024	37.57% 14,899	58.86% 23,339	3.56% 1,412
2020	40.33% 17,191	57.82% 24,646	1.84% 786
2016	35.02% 12,232	59.01% 20,611	5.96% 2,083
2012	29.67% 10,350	68.12% 23,762	2.21% 770
2008	33.71% 11,710	64.28% 22,328	2.00% 696
2004	26.88% 8,617	72.25% 23,164	0.87% 279
2000	28.95% 8,127	67.93% 19,068	3.11% 874
1996	28.51% 7,076	62.95% 15,623	8.54% 2,121
1992	22.99% 6,179	52.77% 14,185	24.25% 6,518
1988	21.21% 4,612	77.90% 16,396	0.89% 193
1984	16.68% 2,537	82.63% 12,566	0.68% 104
1980	17.06% 2,073	74.23% 9,020	8.71% 1,059
1976	29.76% 2,894	68.63% 6,674	1.61% 157
1972	18.62% 1,490	76.56% 6,127	4.82% 386
1968	19.10% 787	75.85% 3,125	5.05% 208

=== Municipal government ===
The city council consists of five members that are elected by residents to four-year terms, with a three-term limit. The council elects its own mayor at the end of every year, whose duties are largely ceremonial because the city employs a council-manager form of government and the city manager runs day-to-day operations.

As of 2026, the mayor is Carlos Rodriguez.

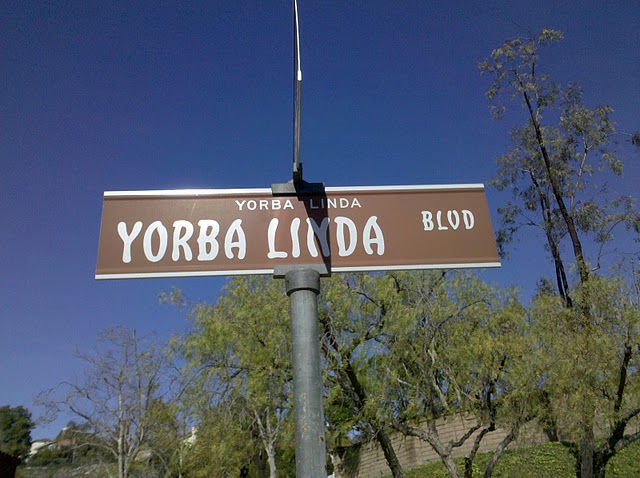
Standard design of street name signs in the city

Yorba Linda has four commissions, which meet monthly or bimonthly, to advise the city council about their respective projects: planning, traffic, parks and recreation, and library.

=== State and federal representation ===
In the California State Legislature, Yorba Linda is in the 32nd senatorial district, represented by Republican Kelly Seyarto, and in the 59th Assembly district, represented by Republican Phillip Chen.

In the United States House of Representatives, Yorba Linda is in California's 40th congressional district, represented by Republican Young Kim.

== Education ==
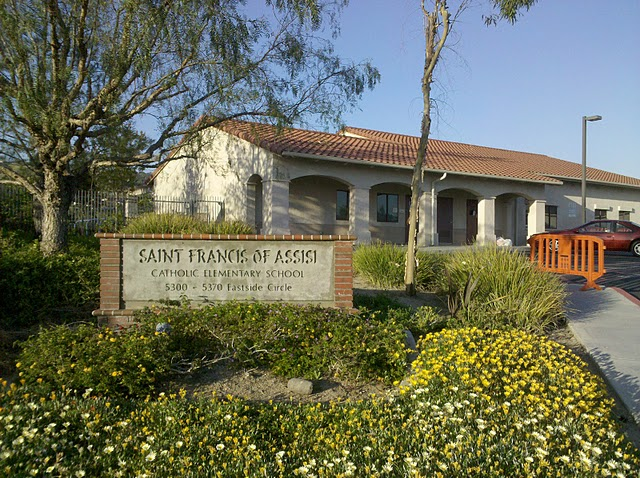
Saint Francis of Assisi Catholic Elementary School

=== Public schools ===
Yorba Linda is part of the Placentia-Yorba Linda Unified School District, and Orange Unified School District.

- Elementary Schools: Bryant Ranch, Fairmont, Glenknoll, Lakeview, Linda Vista, Mabel Paine, Rose Drive, and Travis Ranch.
- Middle Schools: Travis Ranch and Yorba Linda.
- High School: Yorba Linda High School.
- Charter Schools: The Orange County School of Computer Science.

=== Private and Catholic schools ===
- St. Francis of Assisi School is a Catholic school.
- Heritage Oak Private School.
- Friends Christian High School, a private high school.

== Infrastructure ==
=== Transportation ===
Highways include:

- SR 90 (Imperial Highway)
- SR 91 (Riverside Freeway)
- SR 241 (Eastern Transportation Corridor toll road)

A Metrolink commuter rail station was rejected by the city council in 2004.

=== Law enforcement ===
From 1971 to 2013, police services were provided by the Brea Police Department, the first time a municipality, rather than a county sheriff's department, provided police services to another municipality in California. Law enforcement was then contracted to the Orange County Sheriff's Department.

=== Fire services ===
Fire services are provided by the Orange County Fire Authority.

=== Utilities ===
Water services are provided by the Yorba Linda Water District, and by Golden State Water.

Natural gas is provided by Southern California Gas Company, and electricity is provided by Southern California Edison.

== Notable people ==
- Tyler Armstrong – mountain climber, youngest person to climb Mount Aconcagua
- Sabrina Bryan – singer, actress (The Cheetah Girls)
- Nathan Choate – college baseball coach
- Michael D. Duvall – former Yorba Linda mayor, California State Assemblyman
- Danielle Fishel – actress (Boy Meets World)
- John Force – drag racer, owner of John Force Racing, reality TV star of Driving Force and 16 time NHRA Funny Car Champion
- Brittany Force – drag racer, 2017 NHRA Top Fuel Champion
- Courtney Force – drag racer
- Ashley Force Hood – drag racer
- Ian Fowles – musician and guitarist for the California-based rock band The Aquabats
- Eric Friedman, also known as "Erock" – touring guitarist for Creed, former guitarist for Submersed, disc golfer
- Christian Gates – musician and producer
- Joe Hawley – player in National Football League, back-up center for the Tampa Bay Buccaneers
- Robert Hight – drag racer, NHRA Funny Car Champion
- Matthew Hoppe – soccer player on Sønderjyske in the Danish Superliga and the United States national team
- Cole Irvin – Major League Baseball player for the Oakland Athletics
- Mitzi Kapture – soap actress
- Dan Kennedy – Major League Soccer player (Chivas USA)
- Bobby Knoop – Major League Baseball player
- Steven Lenhart – Major League Soccer player (San Jose Earthquakes)
- Wade Meckler (born 2000) - baseball outfielder for the San Francisco Giants
- Alli Mauzey – Broadway actress (Wicked, Hairspray, Cry-Baby)
- David McNab – senior vice president of hockey operations of the Anaheim Ducks.
- Dylan Moore – Major League Baseball player for the Seattle Mariners
- Marcus Mumford – musician (Mumford and Sons)
- Richard Nixon – 37th President of the United States. Richard Nixon was born in Yorba Linda in 1913 and lived there until 1922. His reconstructed home is listed as a National Historic Landmark and a California Historical Landmark. Adjacent to this home is the Richard Nixon Library and Museum.
- Audrina Patridge – reality TV actress (The Hills)
- Chris Pontius – Major League Soccer player (D.C. United)
- Bob "Buck" Rodgers – Major League baseball player and manager (Angels)
- Beneil Dariush – UFC Fighter
- Sergio Santos – Major League Baseball (Toronto Blue Jays)
- Ricky Wells – speedway rider, 2009 US National Champion
- Jessamyn West – second cousin to Richard Nixon on her mother's side of the family, authored 1945 novel The Friendly Persuasion; a city park is named in her honor, Jessamyn West Park on Yorba Linda Boulevard

== Sister cities ==
- Jorba, Catalonia, Spain
- Huai'an, Jiangsu, China

== See also ==
- Friends Church (Yorba Linda)
