= Bernardo Yorba =

Californio landowner and rancher (1800–1858)

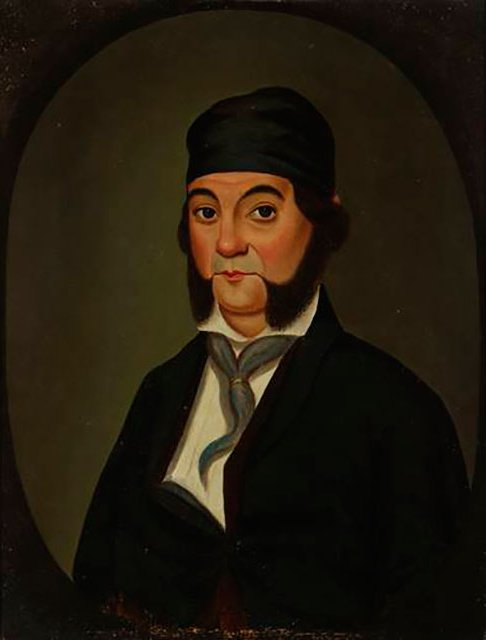
- Portrait of Yorba, c. 1840

Alcalde of Santa Ana
- In office 1833–1836
- In office 1840–1844

Personal details
- Born: August 20, 1800 San Diego
- Died: November 28, 1858 (aged 58) Yorba Linda
- Resting place: Yorba Cemetery

Bernardo Yorba (August 20, 1800 – November 28, 1858) was a prominent Californio landowner, ranchero, politician, and public figure. He was one of the wealthiest men in early 19th-century California. Yorba also served as alcalde (mayor) of Santa Ana. The city of Yorba Linda is named after him.

Born to José Antonio Yorba, a member of the Portolà expedition, Yorba was one of California's largest landowners and most successful ranchers, with thousands of cattle and horses grazing on land grants totaling more than 35,000 acres. Bernado Yorba managed his holdings from the Hacienda de San Antonio, the principal hacienda of the Yorba family.

== Life ==
Bernardo Yorba was born on August 20, 1800, in San Diego. Other sources list his birth on August 4, 1801. Bernardo was the son of José Antonio Yorba, one of the first Spanish soldiers to arrive in California, and Maria Josefa Grijalva. Bernardo's childhood was spent in San Diego, where he attended a school kept by Franciscan Fathers. Jose Antonio Yorba had moved to the Rancho Santiago de Santa Ana, granted to him and his nephew Pablo Peralta, by Governor José Joaquín de Arrillaga on behalf of the Spanish Government in 1810. It was around this time that the family moved to the rancho near present-day Olive, California, in Orange County.

In 1834, Bernardo was granted the 13,328-acre (53.94 km^{2}) Rancho Cañón de Santa Ana. It was shortly after this that Bernardo began construction of a large adobe house, the Bernardo Yorba Hacienda. Bernardo was elected to serve as Juez de Campo and Auxiliary Alcade several times (1833, 1836, 1840, and 1844). In 1846, he was granted Rancho La Sierra.

== Descendants ==
In 1858, at the age of 58, Bernardo Yorba died leaving behind a large and prosperous rancho and many children. Some sources list his death on November 28, 1858. Other sources list his death on October 21, 1858. He was interred in the old Calvary Cemetery in Los Angeles. He left the land for a cemetery, the Yorba Cemetery, in his will but it was not ready for a burial until 1862. He and nine of his family members remained at Calvary until 1923 when they were all moved and reinterred at Yorba Cemetery. He married his first wife, Maria de Jesus Alvarado, in 1819. After her death, he married Felipa Dominguez in 1829, and after her death, Andrea Elizalde (Davila) in 1854.

The children of Bernardo Yorba and Maria de Jesus Alvarado (1796–1828)
Name	Birth/Death	Married	Notes
Dolores Yorba	1824–		
Raymundo Yorba	1826–1891	Francisca Dominguez, Concepcion Serrano	
Maria Ynez Yorba	1827–1911	Leonardo Cota	
Ramona Anselma Yorba	1828–1849	Benjamin Davis Wilson	
The children of Bernardo Yorba and Felipa Dominguez (1812–1851)
Name	Birth/Death	Married	Notes
Maria de Jesus Yorba	1831–	Anastasio Botiller, Thomas J. Scully	
Prudencio Yorba	1832–1885	Maria de los Dolores Ontiveros	One of their children, Angelina Yorba, would marry Samuel Kraemer in 1886.
Jose de Jesus Yorba	1833–1881	Soledad Lugo	
Marcos Yorba	1834–1892	Ramona Yorba	
Leonora Yorba	1838–	John Rowland	
Trinidad Yorba	1840–1881	Jesus Lugo, Josefa Palomares	
Vicente Yorba	1844–1903	Erolinda Cota	
Sinobia / Zenobia Yorba	1845–1892	Thomas Rowland	
The children of Bernardo Yorba and Andrea Elizalde (1830–)
Name	Birth/Death	Married	Notes
Bernardo Antonio Yorba II	1855–1888		
Francisco Xavier Yorba	1856–	Victorine Carnaham	
Gregorio Yorba	1857–		
