= José Antonio Yorba =

Spanish (Catalan) settler of California (1743–1825)

José Antonio Yorba (July 20, 1743 – January 16, 1825), also known as Don José Antonio Yorba I, was a Spanish Californio soldier and an early settler of Spanish California.

== Spanish soldier ==
Born in Sant Sadurní d'Anoia (San Saturnino) in Catalonia, Spain, Yorba was one of Fages' original Catalan volunteers. In 1762, during the Seven Years' War, Yorba took part in the Spanish invasion of Portugal. He became a corporal under Gaspar de Portolà during the Spanish expedition of 1769. He was in San Francisco in 1777; Monterey in 1782; and in San Diego in 1789. In 1797 he was retired as inválido sergeant; and in 1810 was grantee of Rancho Santiago de Santa Ana.

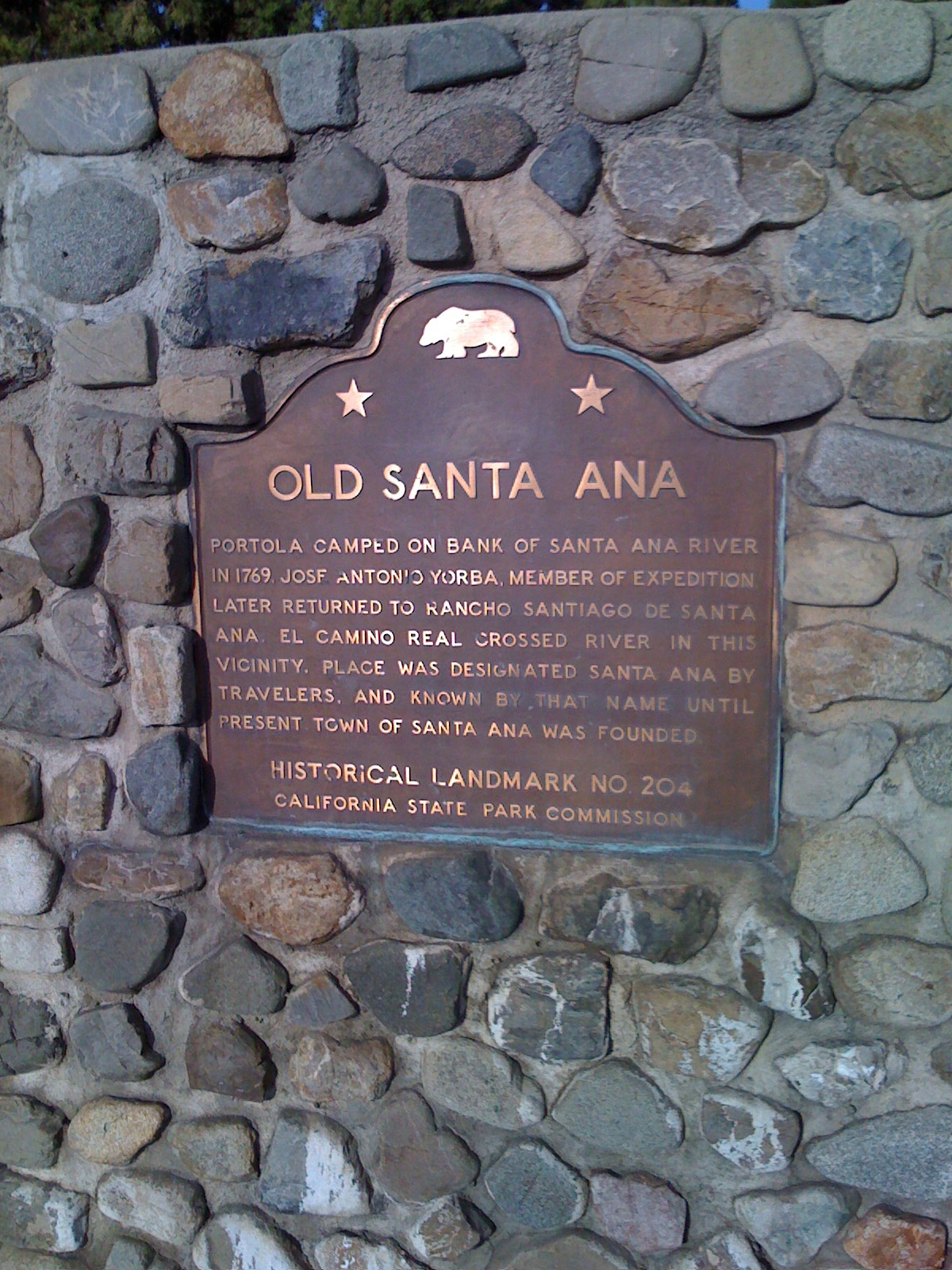
California Historical Landmark #204

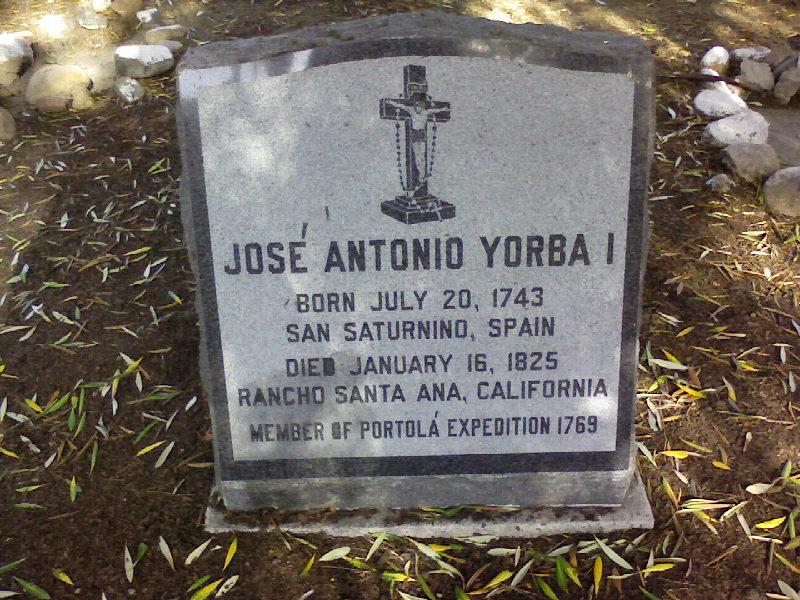
Yorba's cenotaph at the Mission San Juan Capistrano cemetery

== Rancho Santiago de Santa Ana ==
In 1810, José Antonio Yorba was awarded by the Spanish Empire the 63,414-acre (256.63 km^{2}) Rancho Santiago de Santa Ana land grant. Covering some 15 Spanish leagues, Yorba's land comprised a significant portion of today's Orange County including where the cities of Olive, Orange, Villa Park, Santa Ana, Tustin, Costa Mesa and Newport Beach stand today.

Upon his death in 1825 he was buried at his request in an unmarked grave in the cemetery at Mission San Juan Capistrano. A cenotaph was later placed in Yorba's honor.

== Descendants ==
He married his first wife, Maria Garcia Feliz, in 1773. After her death, he married Maria Josefa Grijalva, daughter of Juan Pablo Grijalva, in 1782.

The children of Jose Antonio Yorba I and Maria Gracia Feliz (1753 – 1781)
Name	Birth/Death	Married	Notes
Pedro Antonio Yorba	1774 - 1780		Died in childhood
Francisco Xavier Yorba	1776 -		
Diego Maria Yorba	1780 -		
The children of Jose Antonio Yorba I and Maria Josefa Grijalva (1766 – 1830)
Name	Birth/Death	Married	Notes
Francisco Yorba	1783 - 1783		Died in childhood
Jose Antonio Yorba II	1785 - 1844	Maria Josefa Verdugo (1805), Maria Catalina Verdugo (1834), Maria Catalina Manriquez (1836)	Maria Verdugo was then daughter of Jose Maria Verdugo. After Josefa died in 1816, Jose Antonio Yorba II married her sister, Maria Catalina Verdugo.
Tomas Antonio Yorba	1787 - 1845	Maria Vicenta Sepulveda	
Ysabel Maria Yorba	1789 - 1871	Jose Joaquin Maitorena	Grantee of Rancho Guadalasca. Santa Barbara house
Maria Raymunda Yorba	1793 - 1851	Juan Bautista Alvarado	
Maria Presentacion Yorba	1791 - 1835	Leandro Serrano	Leandro Serrano was the grantee of Rancho Temescal
Jose Domingo Yorba	1795 - 1796		Died in childhood
Francisca Dominga Yorba	1797 - 1814	Jose Francisco Maria Ortega	
Maria de las Nieves Yorba	1798 - 1798		Died in childhood
Bernardo Antonio Yorba	1801 - 1858	Maria de Jesus Alvarado, Felipa Dominguez, Andrea Elizalde	Among Yorba's many children, Bernardo Yorba would rise the farthest, accumulating ever larger territories for the family's massive cattle herds. Bernardo Yorba introduced irrigation agriculture into California on the Rancho Cañón de Santa Ana. The Hacienda de San Antonio, which was amongst the largest adobe dwellings in Alta California. The city of Yorba Linda is named after Bernardo Yorba.
Juan Pablo Yorba	1803 - 1804		Died in childhood
Teodosio Juan Yorba	1805 - 1863	Inocencia Reyes, Maria Antonia Lugo	Prisoner in 1838. Grantee of Rancho Arroyo Seco in 1840. Grantee of Rancho Lomas de Santiago in 1846.
Maria Andrea Ygnacia Yorba	1807 - 1824	José María Ávila	
Martin Yorba	1810 - 1812		Died in childhood

Throughout the American and Mormon migration period, descendants of the Yorbas continued to marry into other prominent Spanish families, including the Cota, Grijalvas, Perralta, and Dominguez families. Many of today's recognizable American names in the Southern California area, including the Kraemers and Irvines, also married into these Spanish families. In the early twentieth century, Samuel Kraemer, who had married the last of the "grand" Yorbas, Angelina Yorba, tore down the historic Yorba Hacienda after the city of Yorba Linda refused to accept it as a donation.

His granddaughter Ramona Yorba was the first wife of the maternal grandfather of General George S.Patton.

The legacy of the Yorba family can be appreciated at the historic Yorba Cemetery, established in 1858, and currently surrounded by Woodgate Park.

== See also ==
- Cristobal Aguilar, last Hispanic mayor of Los Angeles until Antonio Villaraigosa, married Maria Dolores Yorba
- Californios
