= Rancho Santiago de Santa Ana =

Mexican land grant in California

Coordinates: 33.740°N 117.880°W

Rancho Santiago de Santa Ana was a 63,414-acre (256.63 km^{2}) Spanish land concession in present-day Orange County, California, given by Spanish Alta California governor José Joaquín de Arrillaga in 1810 to Jose Antonio Yorba and his nephew Pablo Peralta. The grant extended eastward from the Santa Ana River to the Santa Ana Mountains, with a length of more than 22 miles (35 km).

The lands encompass present-day Santa Ana, Orange, Villa Park, Anaheim Hills, El Modena, Tustin, Costa Mesa, and a part of Irvine, which was formerly known as Rancho Lomas de Santiago and was titled to one of the Yorbas.

== History ==
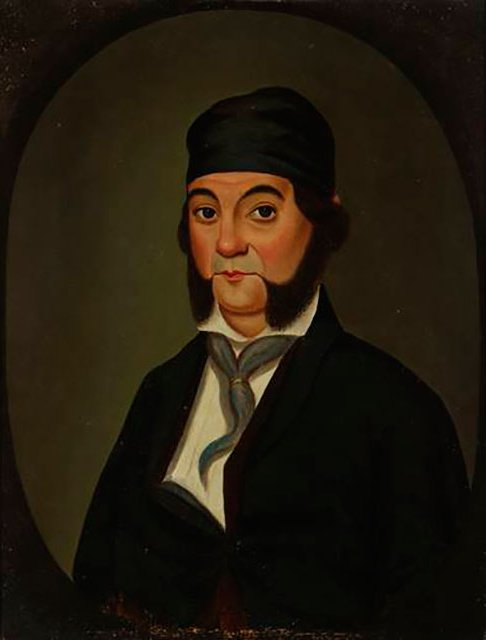
Don Bernardo Yorba, a prominent Californio ranchero, inherited Rancho Santiago de Santa Ana from his father, José Antonio Yorba, who was granted the rancho in 1810.

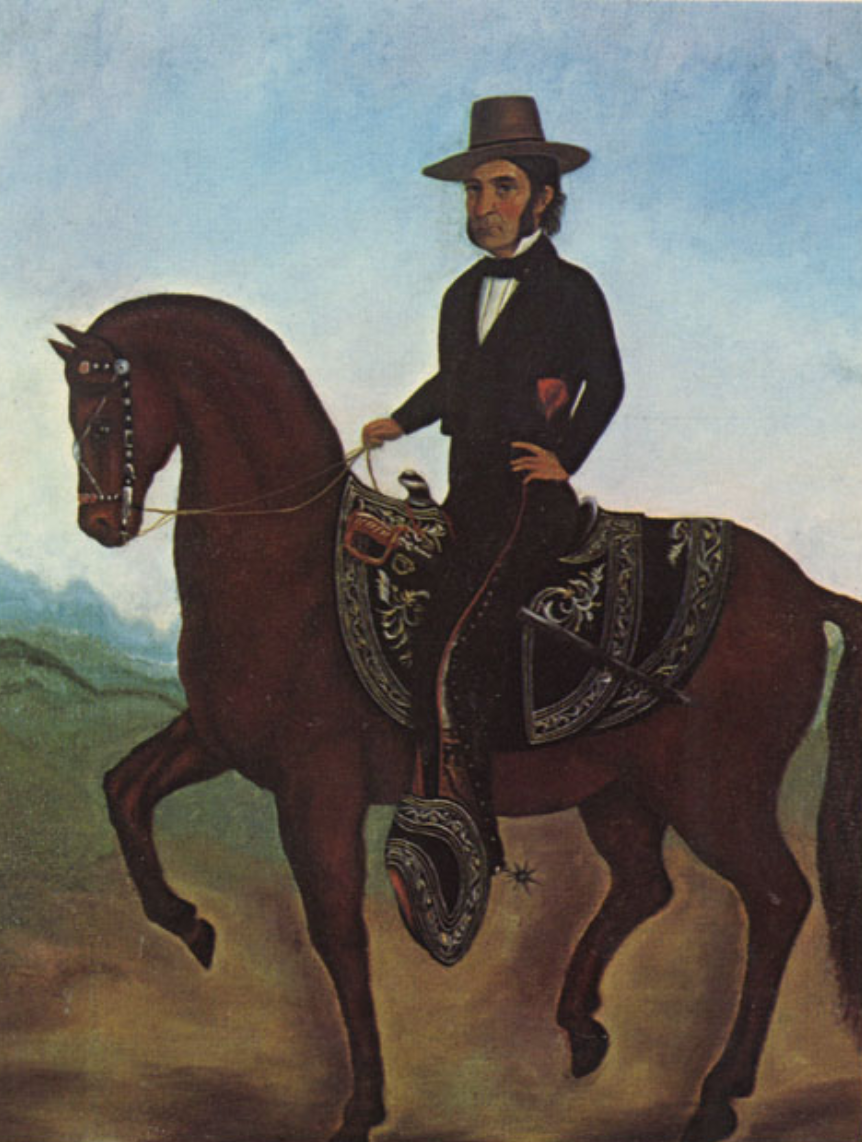
José Andrés Sepúlveda, a famed Californio vaquero, bought the rancho in 1854.

Juan Pablo Grijalva, a Spanish soldier who traveled to Alta California with the De Anza expedition, was the original petitioner for the lands that became known as the "Rancho Santiago de Santa Ana". He died before the grant was approved and the lands went to his son-in-law, José Antonio Yorba and his grandson, Juan Pablo Peralta. On July 1, 1810, the land later named Rancho Santiago de Santa Ana was granted to José Antonio Yorba and his nephew Pablo Peralta by Governor José Joaquín de Arrillaga on behalf of the Spanish Government. This was the only land grant in present-day Orange County given under Spanish Rule which were rare during this time. This was only two and a half months before the start of the war for Mexican Independence (1810–1821). The surrounding land grants or ranchos were granted by the Mexican government after Mexican independence in 1821.

The lands encroached upon the village of Puhú, shared by the Tongva, Acjachemen, Payómkawichum, and Serrano, that had been established long before the arrival of the Spanish. In 1832, the village people were massacred after a raid of American and Mexican fur trappers led by William Wolfskill.

José Antonio Yorba built an elaborate adobe hacienda, El Refugio (the Refuge), located near present-day First and Sullivan Streets in western Santa Ana.

With the Mexican Cession of California to the United States following the Mexican–American War, the 1848 Treaty of Guadalupe Hidalgo provided that the land grants would be honored. As required by the Land Act of 1851, a claim for Rancho Santiago de Santa Ana was filed with the Public Land Commission in 1852, and the grant was patented to Bernardo, Teodoro and Ramón Yorba in 1883.

In 1854, the Yorba family sold Rancho Santiago de Santa Ana to José Antonio Andrés Sepúlveda. Sepúlveda later lost the land due to bankruptcy caused by fighting to uphold his land claims in court. In 1869, William Spurgeon and Ward Bradford purchased 74.27 acres (0.3006 km^{2}) of the ranch to form the city of Santa Ana. It became the seat of government for the County in 1889.

The ranch further disintegrated with purchases by James Irvine, and James McFadden who built the McFadden Wharf in 1888.

== Present day ==
=== Modern use of the Santiago name ===
- Casa de Santiago (neighborhood), Santa Ana, California
- Rancho Santiago Community College District, Santa Ana
- Santiago Park, Santa Ana
- Santiago Street, Santa Ana
- Santiago Canyon, Silverado, California
- Santiago Canyon College, Orange, California – RSCCD
- Santiago Canyon Trail, Orange, CA – Corona, California
- Santiago Communities
- Santiago Corporation
- Santiago Creek, Orange – Santa Ana
- Santiago High School, Garden Grove, California
- Santiago Hills (neighborhood) Orange, California
- Santiago Hills Elementary, Irvine, California
- Santiago Hills Park, Orange
- Santiago Oaks Regional Park, Orange
- Santiago Peak, Santa Ana Mountains
- Santiago Strings, a Pacific Symphony youth ensemble

=== Historic sites of the Rancho ===
- Diego Sepúlveda Adobe

=== Modern development of the Rancho ===
Besides Santa Ana, other cities and unincorporated communities formed on the old Rancho Santiago de Santa Ana are El Modena, Santa Ana Heights, Orange, Costa Mesa, North Tustin, Tustin, and Olive.

The Rancho Santiago Community College District is located in Santa Ana and is composed of Santa Ana College and Santiago Canyon College in Orange.

== Related links ==
- City of Santa Ana Public Library
- Santa Ana Historical Preservation Society
- City of Santa Ana
- Don Juan Pablo Grijalva: Anza expedition to what is now Orange County
