= Huntington Beach, California =

- City
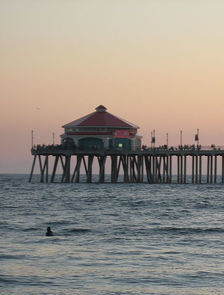
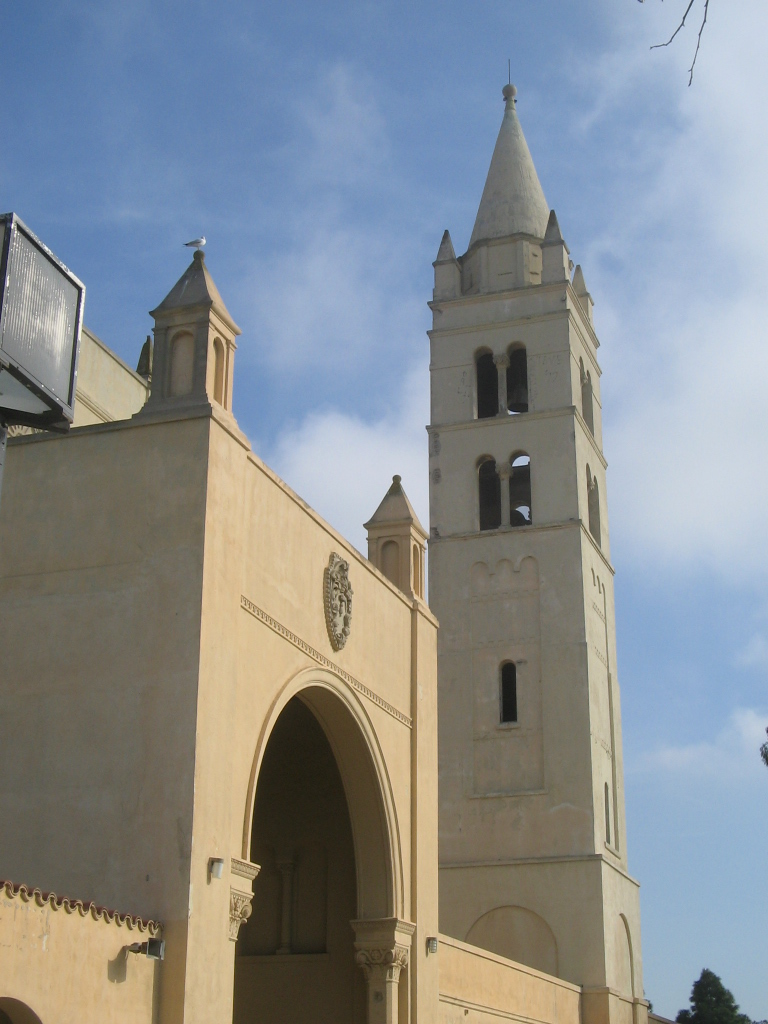
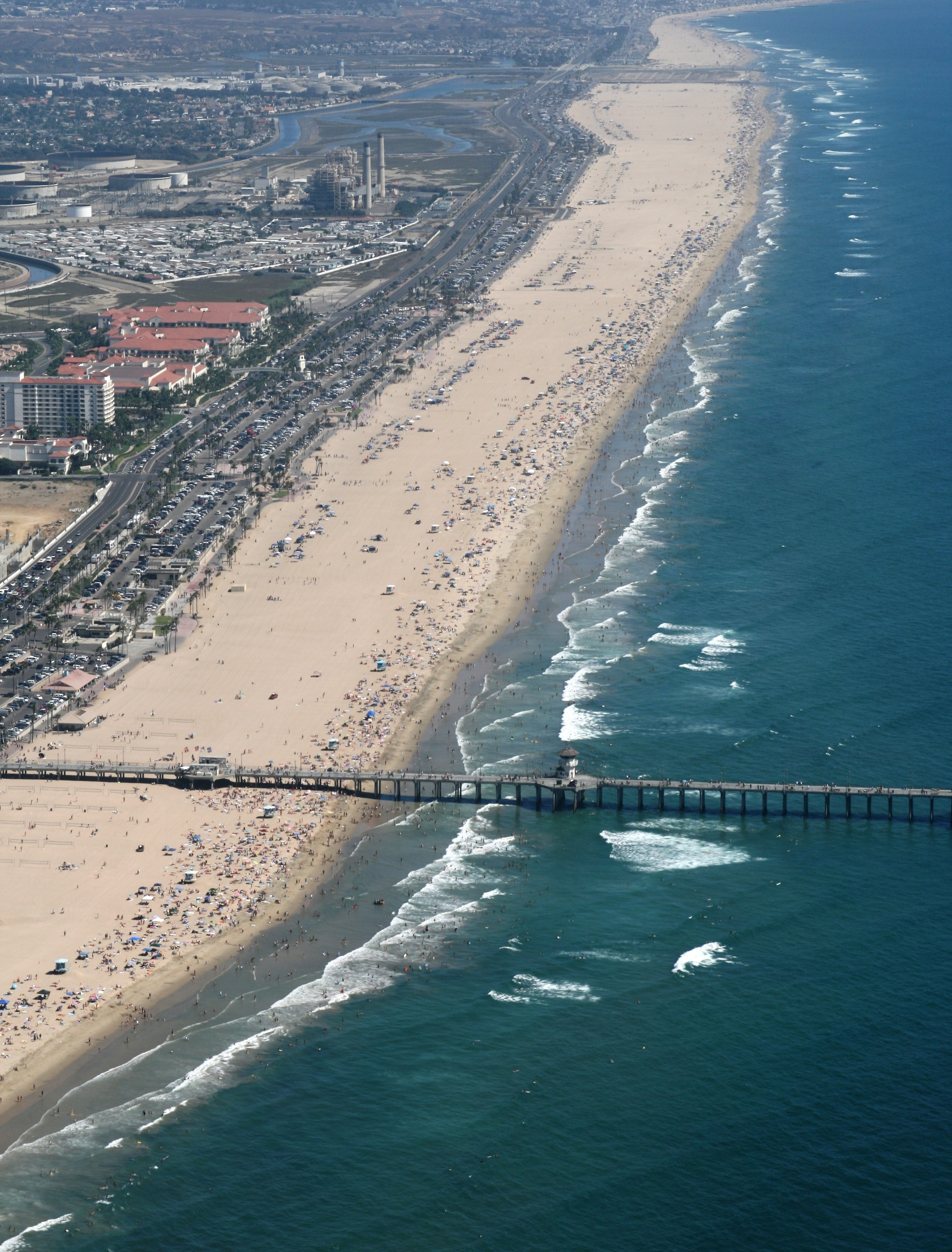
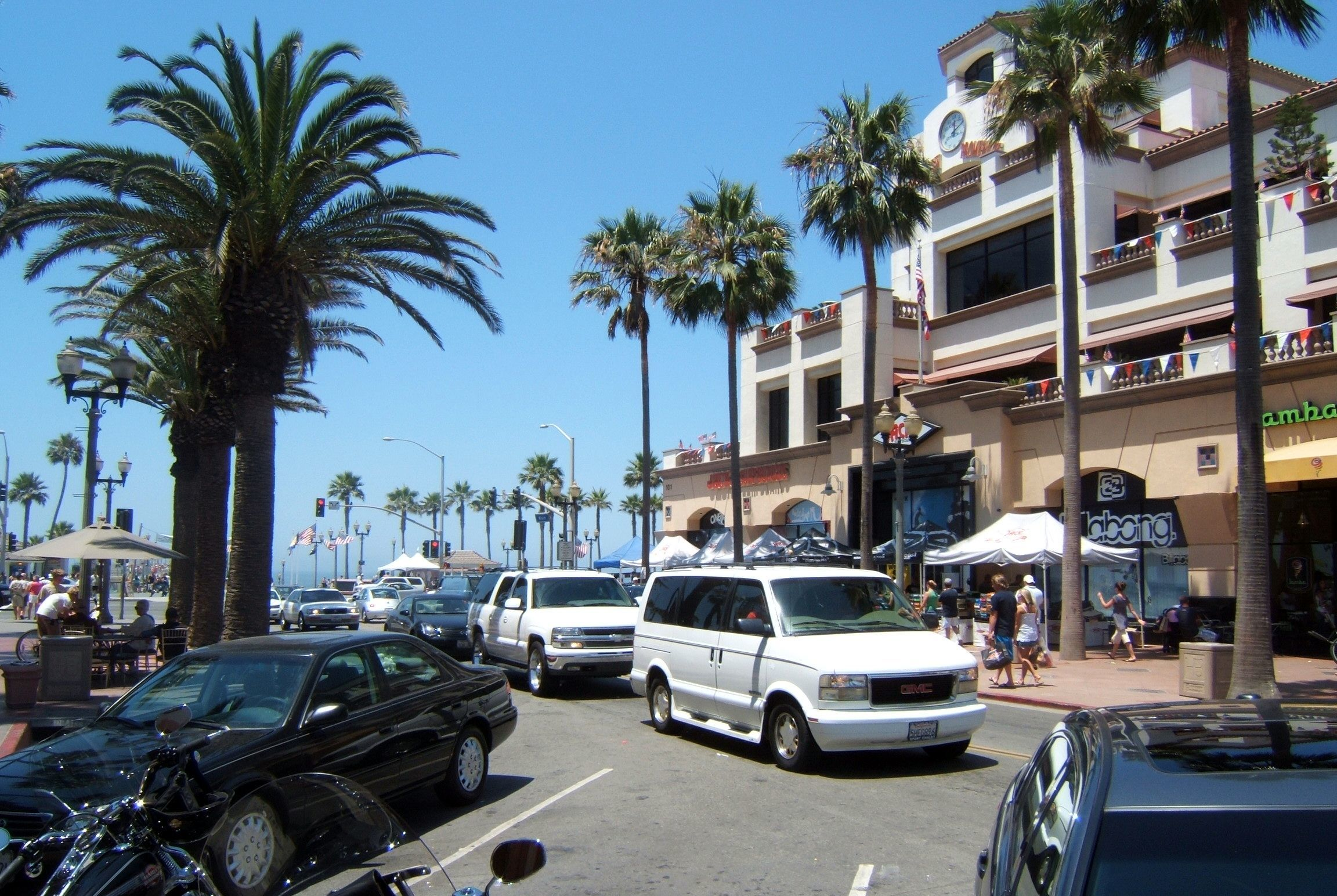
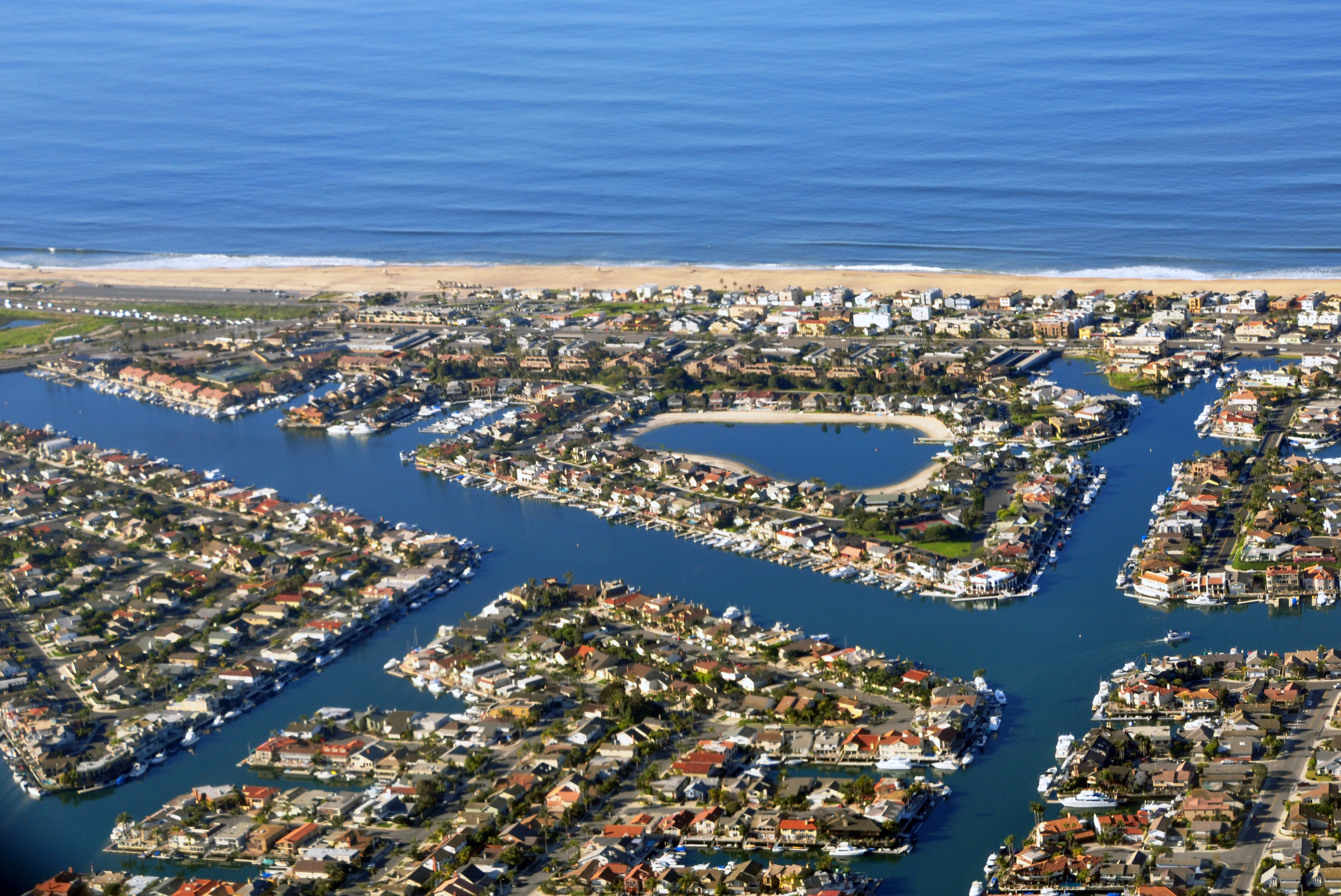
- Clockwise: Huntington Pier; Huntington Beach High School; aerial view of the coast; Sunset Beach; Downtown

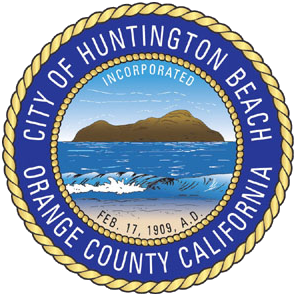
- Flag Seal
- Nickname: Surf City
- Interactive map of Huntington Beach, California
- Location within Greater Los Angeles Location in the state of California Location in the United States
- Coordinates: 33°41′34″N 118°0′1″W
- Country: United States
- State: California
- County: Orange
- Incorporated: February 17, 1909; 117 years ago
- Named for: Henry E. Huntington

Government
  - Type: City council/city manager
  - Mayor: Casey McKeon
  - Mayor pro tem: Butch Twining
  - City council: Pat Burns; Don Kennedy; Andrew Gruel; Gracey Van Der Mark; Chad Williams
  - City attorney: Mike Vigliotta
  - City manager: Travis Hopkins

Area
  - Total: 28.33 sq mi (73.38 km^{2})
  - Land: 27.00 sq mi (69.92 km^{2})
  - Water: 1.34 sq mi (3.46 km^{2}) 4.71%
- Elevation: 39 ft (12 m)

Population (2020)
  - Total: 198,711
  - Rank: 4th in Orange County; 23rd in California; 135th in the United States
  - Density: 7,361/sq mi (2,842/km^{2})
- Time zone: UTC−8 (Pacific)
  - Summer (DST): UTC−7 (PDT)
- ZIP Codes: 92605, 92615, 92646–92649
- Area codes: 562, 657/714
- FIPS code: 06-36000
- GNIS feature IDs: 1652724, 2410811
- Website: huntingtonbeachca.gov

Huntington Beach is a city in Orange County, California, United States. The city was originally called Pacific City, but it was changed in 1903 to be named after American businessman Henry E. Huntington. The population was 198,711 as of the 2020 United States census, making it the fourth most populous city in Orange County, the most populous beach city in Orange County, and the seventh most populous city in the Los Angeles-Long Beach-Anaheim, CA Metropolitan Statistical Area. Located 35 miles (56 km) southeast of Downtown Los Angeles, it is bordered by Bolsa Chica Basin State Marine Conservation Area on the west, the Pacific Ocean on the southwest, by Seal Beach on the northwest, by Westminster on the north, by Fountain Valley on the northeast, by Costa Mesa on the east, and by Newport Beach on the southeast.

Huntington Beach has a long 9.5-mile (15.3 km) stretch of sandy beach, mild climate, conditions considered ideal for surfing, and a strong beach culture. Swells generated predominantly from the North Pacific in winter and from a combination of Southern Hemisphere storms and cyclones in the summer focus on Huntington Beach, creating consistent surf all year long, hence the nickname "Surf City".

== History ==
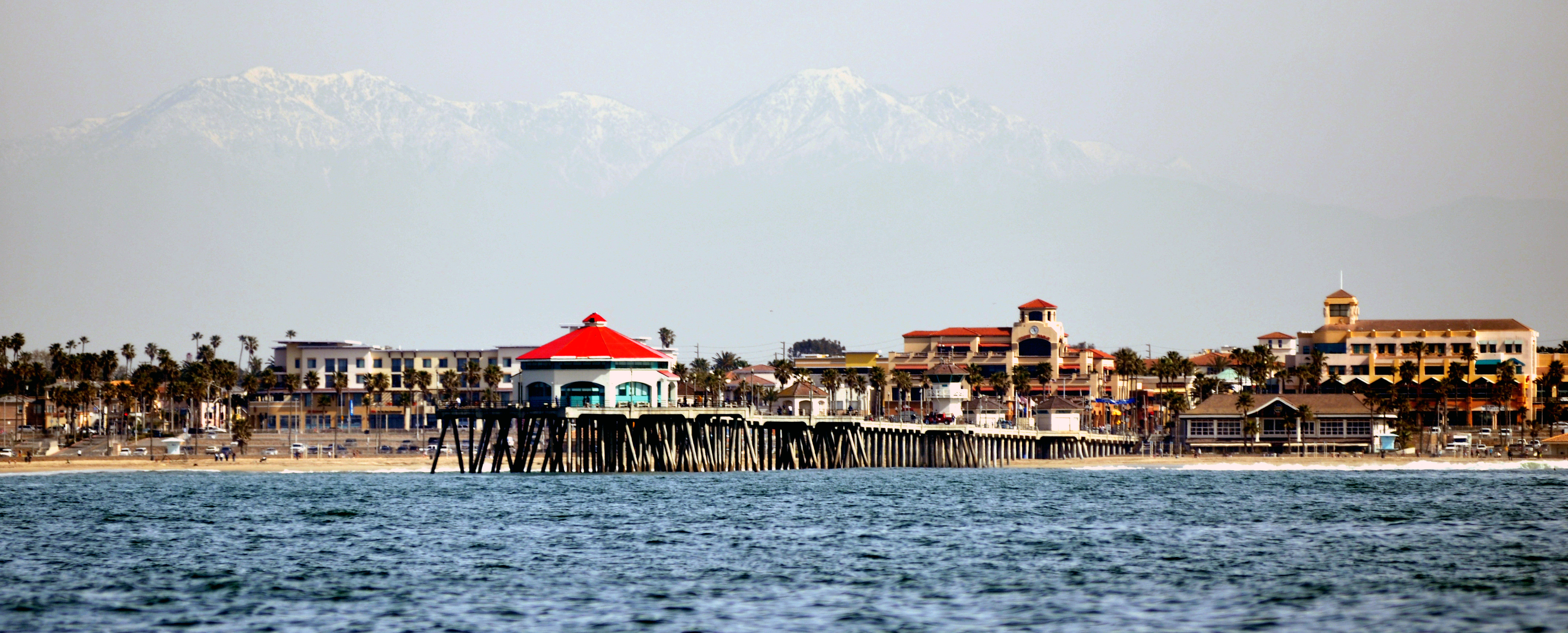
The Huntington Beach Pier

=== Tongva era ===
The Tongva village of Lupukngna was located in what became Huntington Beach, with an approximate location near the Newland House Museum. Bolsa Chica was one of the areas where the Tongva would settle during the winter. The nearby village of Genga, shared with the Acjachemen, was located across the Santa Ana River in what became Newport Beach and Costa Mesa.

=== American era ===
The main thoroughfare of Huntington Beach, Beach Boulevard, was originally a cattle route for the main industry of the Rancho. Once it was known as Shell Beach, the town of Smeltzer, and then Gospel Swamp for the revival meetings that were held in the marshland where the community college Golden West College stands. Later it became known as Fairview and then Pacific City, as it developed into a tourist destination. In order to secure access to the Pacific Electric Red Car lines that used to criss-cross Los Angeles and ended in Long Beach, Pacific City ceded enormous power to railroad magnate Henry E. Huntington, and thus became a city whose name has been written into corporate sponsorship, and like much of the history of Southern California, boosterism.

=== 20th century ===
The original Huntington Beach Pier was built in 1904 and was a 1,000-foot-long timber structure (300 m). Huntington Beach was incorporated on February 17, 1909, during the tenure of its first mayor, Ed Manning. Its first developer was Huntington Beach Company (formerly the West Coast Land and Water Company), a real-estate development firm owned by Henry Huntington. The Huntington Beach Company is still a major land-owner in the city, and owns most of the local mineral rights. The company is wholly owned by the Chevron Corporation.

At one time, an encyclopedia company gave away free parcels of land (with the purchase of a complete set for $126) in the Huntington Beach area. The lucky buyers got more than they had bargained for when oil was discovered in the area, and enormous development of the oil reserves followed. Though many of the old reserves are depleted, and the price of land for housing has pushed many of the rigs off the landscape, oil pumps still dot the city.

Huntington Beach was primarily agricultural in its early years with crops such as lima beans, asparagus, peppers, celery and sugar beets. Holly Sugar was a major employer with a large processing plant in the city that was later converted into an oil refinery.

The city's first high school, Huntington Beach High School, located on Main Street, was built in 1906. The school's team, the Oilers, is named after the city's original natural resource.

Meadowlark Airport, a small general-aviation airport, existed in Huntington Beach from the 1940s until 1989.

Huntington Beach Speedway, a racetrack designed for midget car racing, existed from 1946 until 1958.

=== 21st century ===
In 2023, Huntington Beach became involved in a lawsuit against California governor Gavin Newsom. In March 2023, the state sued Huntington Beach for failing to comply with state housing regulations. The suit brought by the state argued that the city's ban on the processing of Accessory Dwelling Unit (ADU) applications violated state housing laws. The state law required Huntington Beach to zone for 13,368 units to be built inside the city limits from October 2021 to 2029. The state had submitted and amended a complaint as of April 10, 2023, arguing that the city is in violation of the Housing Element Law. The state was seeking both penalties and injunctive relief. In addition to relief, the state was seeking the suspension of the city's permitting authority and mandating the approval of certain projects. On September 12, 2025, the Fourth Circuit of the California Courts of Appeal ruled against Huntington Beach's claim of exemption from consequences, and ordered the trial court to impose a 120-day deadline for the city to update its plan as well as state preemption of city permitting and zoning laws until the city complies with the law.

The city responded to the state's lawsuit with a federal countersuit that argued it is not subject to state housing laws. Huntington Beach's lawsuit describes overturning the Regional Housing Needs Allocation (RHNA) which determines how housing needs are allocated, and challenged RHNA on federal constitutional grounds. Huntington Beach council members have argued that local zoning should be left in control of the city. The state filed a motion on June 22, 2023, to dismiss the city's federal lawsuit. As of November 15, 2023, a federal judge has dismissed Huntington Beach's lawsuit against the state over housing mandates, and a petition by the city for an en banc rehearing of the case was denied by the United States Court of Appeals for the Ninth Circuit on April 21, 2025.

== Geography ==
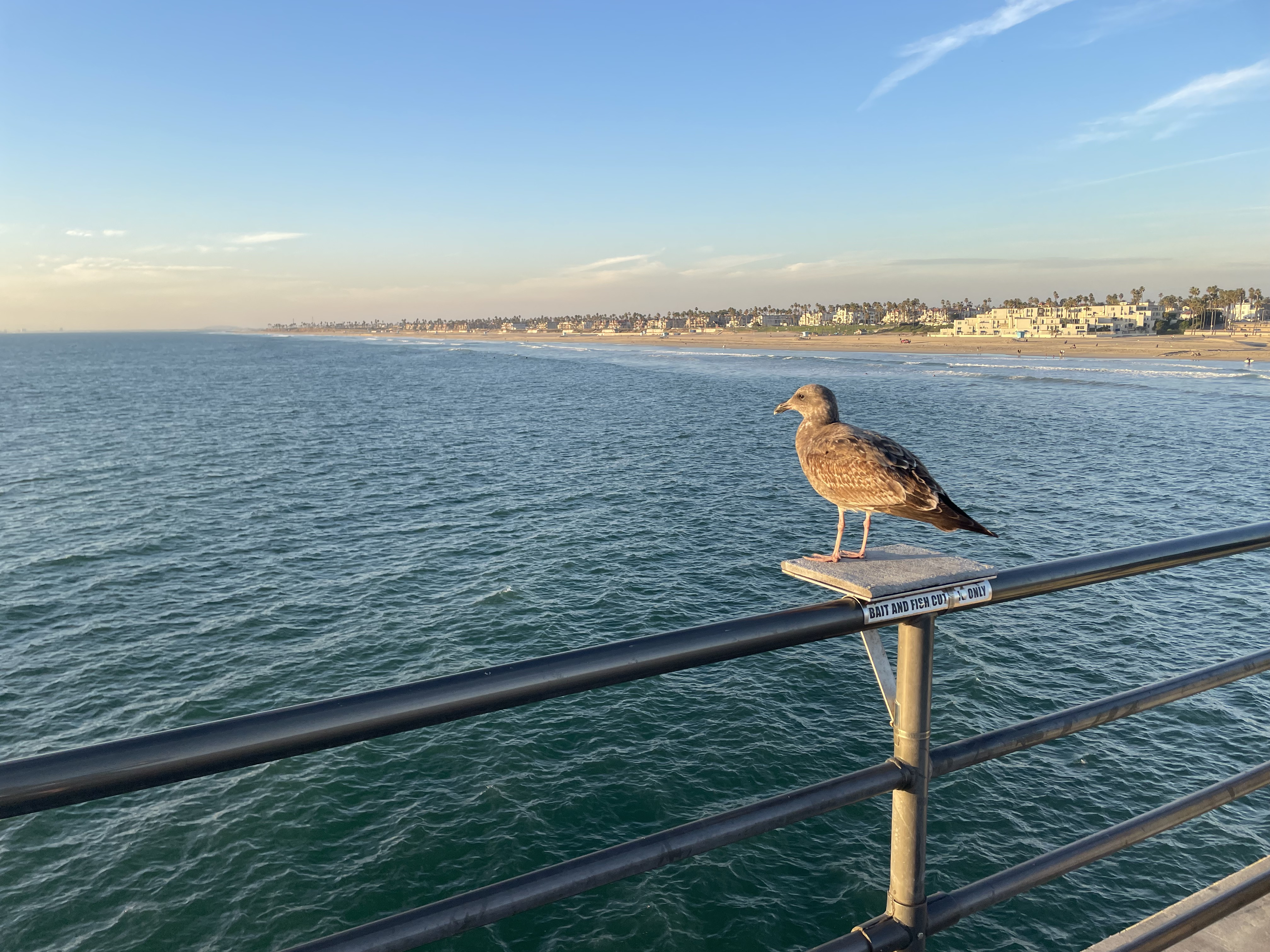
Gull on Huntington Beach Pier

According to the United States Census Bureau, the city has a total area of 28.3 square miles (73.3 km^{2}), of which 27.0 sq mi (70 km^{2}) is land and 1.3 sq mi (3.4 km^{2}) (4.71%) is water.

The entire city of Huntington Beach lies in area codes 714 and 657, except for small parts of Huntington Harbour (along with Sunset Beach, the community adjacent to Huntington Harbour), which is in the 562 area code.

=== Climate ===
Huntington Beach has a borderline semi-arid/Mediterranean climate (Köppen climate classification: BSk/Csb), gradually changing for the second to the west and south due to its low precipitation. Although areas such as Huntington Central Park and northern Bolsa Chica usually fall into the first climate type, thus being the boundary of the cool summer Mediterranean climate on the west coast of North America, except for elevated portions in the southern end of the state. The climate is generally sunny, dry and cool, although evenings can be excessively damp. In the morning and evening, strong breezes often reach 15 mph (24 km/h). Ocean water temperatures average 55 to 65 °F (13 to 18 °C). In the summer, temperatures rarely exceed 85 °F (29 °C). In the winter, temperatures rarely fall below 40 °F (4 °C), even on clear nights. There are about 14 inches (360 mm) of rain, almost all in mid-winter. Frost occurs only rarely, on the coldest winter nights. The area is annually affected by a marine layer caused by the cool air of the Pacific Ocean meeting the warm air over the land. This results in overcast and foggy conditions in May and June.

Climate data for Huntington Beach, California
Month	Jan	Feb	Mar	Apr	May	Jun	Jul	Aug	Sep	Oct	Nov	Dec	Year
Record high °F (°C)	87 (31)	89 (32)	91 (33)	98 (37)	90 (32)	102 (39)	106 (41)	94 (34)	107 (42)	96 (36)	94 (34)	94 (34)	107 (42)
Mean daily maximum °F (°C)	64 (18)	64 (18)	64 (18)	66 (19)	68 (20)	68 (20)	71 (22)	73 (23)	73 (23)	71 (22)	68 (20)	64 (18)	68 (20)
Daily mean °F (°C)	56 (13)	57 (14)	57 (14)	60 (16)	62 (17)	64 (18)	67 (19)	69 (21)	68 (20)	65 (18)	60 (16)	56 (13)	62 (17)
Mean daily minimum °F (°C)	48 (9)	50 (10)	51 (11)	54 (12)	57 (14)	60 (16)	63 (17)	64 (18)	63 (17)	59 (15)	52 (11)	48 (9)	56 (13)
Record low °F (°C)	29 (−2)	28 (−2)	33 (1)	38 (3)	40 (4)	48 (9)	49 (9)	52 (11)	49 (9)	32 (0)	34 (1)	32 (0)	28 (−2)
Average precipitation inches (mm)	2.60 (66)	2.54 (65)	2.25 (57)	0.70 (18)	0.18 (4.6)	0.08 (2.0)	0.02 (0.51)	0.09 (2.3)	0.30 (7.6)	0.28 (7.1)	1.02 (26)	1.59 (40)	11.65 (296.11)
Average precipitation days	5	5	6	3	1	0	0	1	1	2	4	5	33
Mean monthly sunshine hours	217	226	279	300	279	270	341	341	270	248	210	217	3,198
Mean daily sunshine hours	7	8	9	10	9	9	11	11	9	8	7	7	9
Percentage possible sunshine	69	73	75	76	65	63	78	82	73	71	67	70	72
Average ultraviolet index	3	4	6	8	9	10	10	10	8	5	4	3	7
Source 1: Weather Channel
Source 2: Weather Atlas

=== Natural resources ===
Between Downtown Huntington Beach and Huntington Harbour lies a large marshy wetland, much of which is protected within the Bolsa Chica Ecological Reserve. A $110 million restoration of the wetlands was completed in 2006. The reserve is popular with bird watchers and photographers.

South of Downtown, the Talbert, Brookhurst and Magnolia Marshes, which lie across the street from Huntington State Beach, had restoration completed in 2010.

The northern and southern beaches (Bolsa Chica State Beach and Huntington State Beach, respectively) are state parks. Only the city maintains the central beach (Huntington City Beach). Camping and RVs are permitted here, and popular campsites for the Fourth of July and the Surfing Championships must be reserved many months in advance. Bolsa Chica State Beach is actually a sand bar fronting the Bolsa Bay and Bolsa Chica State Ecological Reserve.

The Orange County run Sunset Marina Park next to Huntington Harbour is part of Anaheim Bay. It is suitable for light craft, and includes a marina, launching ramp, basic services, a picnic area and a few restaurants. The park is in Seal Beach, but is only reachable from Huntington Harbour. The Sunset/Huntington Harbour area is patrolled by the Orange County Sheriff's Harbor Patrol.

The harbor entrance for Anaheim Bay is sometimes restricted by the United States Navy, which loads ships with munitions at the Seal Beach Naval Weapons Station to the north of the main channel.

== Demographics ==
Historical population
Census	Pop.	Note	%±
1910	815		—
1920	1,687		107.0%
1930	3,690		118.7%
1940	3,738		1.3%
1950	5,237		40.1%
1960	11,492		119.4%
1970	115,960		909.0%
1980	170,505		47.0%
1990	181,519		6.5%
2000	189,594		4.4%
2010	189,992		0.2%
2020	198,711		4.6%
2024 (est.)	193,151		−2.8%
U.S. Decennial Census; 1860–1870 1880–1890; 1900 1910 1920; 1930 1940 1950; 1960 1970 1980; 1990 2000 2010; 2020

Huntington Beach first appeared as a city in the 1910 United States census.

=== 2020 ===
The 2020 United States census reported that Huntington Beach had a population of 198,711. The population density was 7,360.5 inhabitants per square mile (2,841.9/km^{2}). The racial makeup of Huntington Beach was 126,591 (63.7%) White (59.2% Non-Hispanic white), 2,291 (1.2%) African American, 1,293 (0.7%) Native American, 26,346 (13.2%) Asian, 603 (0.3%) Pacific Islander, 15,689 (7.9%) from other races, and 25,898 (13.0%) from two or more races. There were 39,457 Hispanic or Latino residents of any race (19.9%).

Huntington Beach city, California – racial and ethnic composition Note: the US Census treats Hispanic/Latino as an ethnic category. This table excludes Latinos from the racial categories and assigns them to a separate category. Hispanics/Latinos may be of any race.
Race / ethnicity (NH = Non-Hispanic)	Pop 1980	Pop 1990	Pop 2000	Pop 2010	Pop 2020	% 1980	% 1990	% 2000	% 2010	% 2020
White alone (NH)	145,763	143,858	136,237	127,640	117,536	85.49%	79.25%	71.86%	67.18%	59.15%
Black or African American alone (NH)	958	1,622	1,383	1,635	2,111	0.56%	0.89%	0.73%	0.86%	1.06%
Native American or Alaska Native alone (NH)	1,231	932	777	532	443	0.72%	0.51%	0.41%	0.28%	0.22%
Asian alone (NH)	8,869	14,565	17,544	20,792	25,921	5.20%	8.02%	9.25%	10.94%	13.04%
Native Hawaiian or Pacific Islander alone (NH)	8,869	14,565	432	595	532	5.20%	8.02%	0.23%	0.31%	0.27%
Other race alone (NH)	251	155	314	395	1,234	0.15%	0.09%	0.17%	0.21%	0.62%
Mixed-race or multiracial (NH)	x	x	5,109	5,992	11,477	x	x	2.69%	3.15%	5.78%
Hispanic or Latino (any race)	13,433	20,397	27,798	32,411	39,457	7.88%	11.24%	14.66%	17.06%	19.86%
Total	170,505	181,519	189,594	189,992	198,711	100.00%	100.00%	100.00%	100.00%	100.00%

=== 2010 ===
The 2010 United States census reported that Huntington Beach had a population of 189,992. The population density was 7,102.9 inhabitants per square mile (2,742.4/km^{2}). The racial makeup of Huntington Beach was 145,661 (76.7%) White, 1,813 (1.0%) African American, 992 (0.5%) Native American, 21,070 (11.1%) Asian, 635 (0.3%) Pacific Islander, 11,193 (5.9%) from other races, and 8,628 (4.5%) from two or more races. There were 32,411 Hispanic or Latino residents of any race (17.1%). Non-Hispanic Whites were 67.2% of the population.

The Census reported that 189,102 people (99.5% of the population) lived in households, 487 (0.3%) lived in non-institutionalized group quarters, and 403 (0.2%) were institutionalized.

There were 74,285 households, out of which 21,922 (29.5%) had children under the age of 18 living in them, 36,729 (49.4%) were opposite-sex married couples living together, 7,685 (10.3%) had a female householder with no husband present, 3,804 (5.1%) had a male householder with no wife present. There were 4,386 (5.9%) unmarried opposite-sex partnerships, and 504 (0.7%) same-sex married couples or partnerships. 18,489 households (24.9%) were made up of individuals, and 6,527 (8.8%) had someone living alone who was 65 years of age or older. The average household size was 2.55. There were 48,218 families (64.9% of all households); the average family size was 3.07.

There were 39,128 people (20.6%) under the age of 18, 15,906 people (8.4%) aged 18 to 24, 54,024 people (28.4%) aged 25 to 44, 53,978 people (28.4%) aged 45 to 64, and 26,956 people (14.2%) who were 65 years of age or older. The median age was 40.2 years. For every 100 females, there were 98.5 males. For every 100 females age 18 and over, there were 96.6 males.

There were 78,003 housing units at an average density of 2,446.5 per square mile (944.6/km^{2}), of which 44,914 (60.5%) were owner-occupied, and 29,371 (39.5%) were occupied by renters. The homeowner vacancy rate was 1.1%; the rental vacancy rate was 5.4%. 115,470 people (60.8% of the population) lived in owner-occupied housing units and 73,632 people (38.8%) lived in rental housing units.

During 2009–2013, Huntington Beach had a median household income of $81,389, with 8.9% of the population living below the federal poverty line.

=== 2000 ===
At the 2000 census, the population density was 7,183.6 inhabitants per square mile (2,773.6 inhabitants/km^{2}). There were 75,662 housing units at an average density of 2,866.8 per square mile (1,106.9/km^{2}). The racial makeup of the city was 79.2% White, 0.8% Black or African American, 0.7% Native American, 9.3% Asian, 0.2% Pacific Islander, 5.8% from other races, and 3.9% from two or more races. 14.7% of the population were Hispanic or Latino of any race.

There were 73,657 households, out of which 29.0% had children under the age of 18 living with them, 50.7% were married couples living together, 9.6% had a female householder with no husband present, and 35.2% were non-families. 24.3% of all households were made up of individuals, and 6.7% had someone living alone who was 65 years of age or older. The average household size was 2.56 and the average family size was 3.08.

In the city, 22.2% of the population was under the age of 18, 8.4% was from 18 to 24, 34.9% from 25 to 44, 24.0% from 45 to 64, and 10.4% who were 65 years of age or older. The median age was 36 years. For every 100 females, there were 100.4 males. For every 100 females age 18 and over, there were 98.6 males.

The median income for a household in the city was $76,527, and the median income for a family was $94,597. Adult males had a median income of $50,021 versus $33,041 for adult females. The per capita income for the city was $40,183. About 5.1% of families and 7.8% of the population were below the poverty line, including 11.2% of those under age 18 and 4.4% of those age 65 or over.

=== Crime ===
The Uniform Crime Report (UCR), collected annually by the FBI, compiles police statistics from local and state law enforcement agencies across the nation. The UCR records Part I and Part II crimes. Part I crimes become known to law enforcement and are considered the most serious crimes including homicide, rape, robbery, aggravated assault, burglary, larceny, motor vehicle theft, and arson. Part II crimes only include arrest data. The 2023 UCR data for Huntington Beach are listed below:

2023 UCR data
	Aggravated assault	Homicide	Rape	Robbery	Burglary	Larceny theft	Motor vehicle theft	Arson
Huntington Beach	265	4	55	92	469	3,108	332	39

== Economy ==
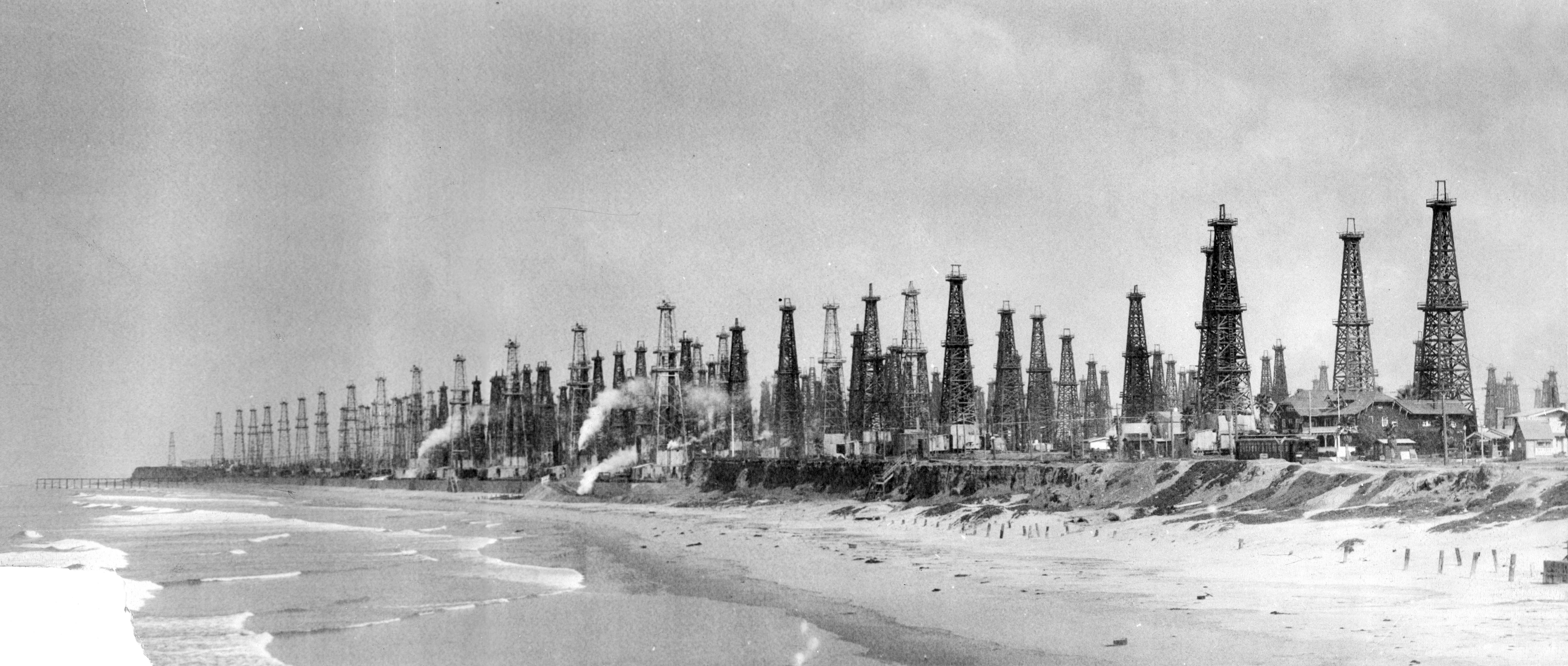
Oil wells, 1926

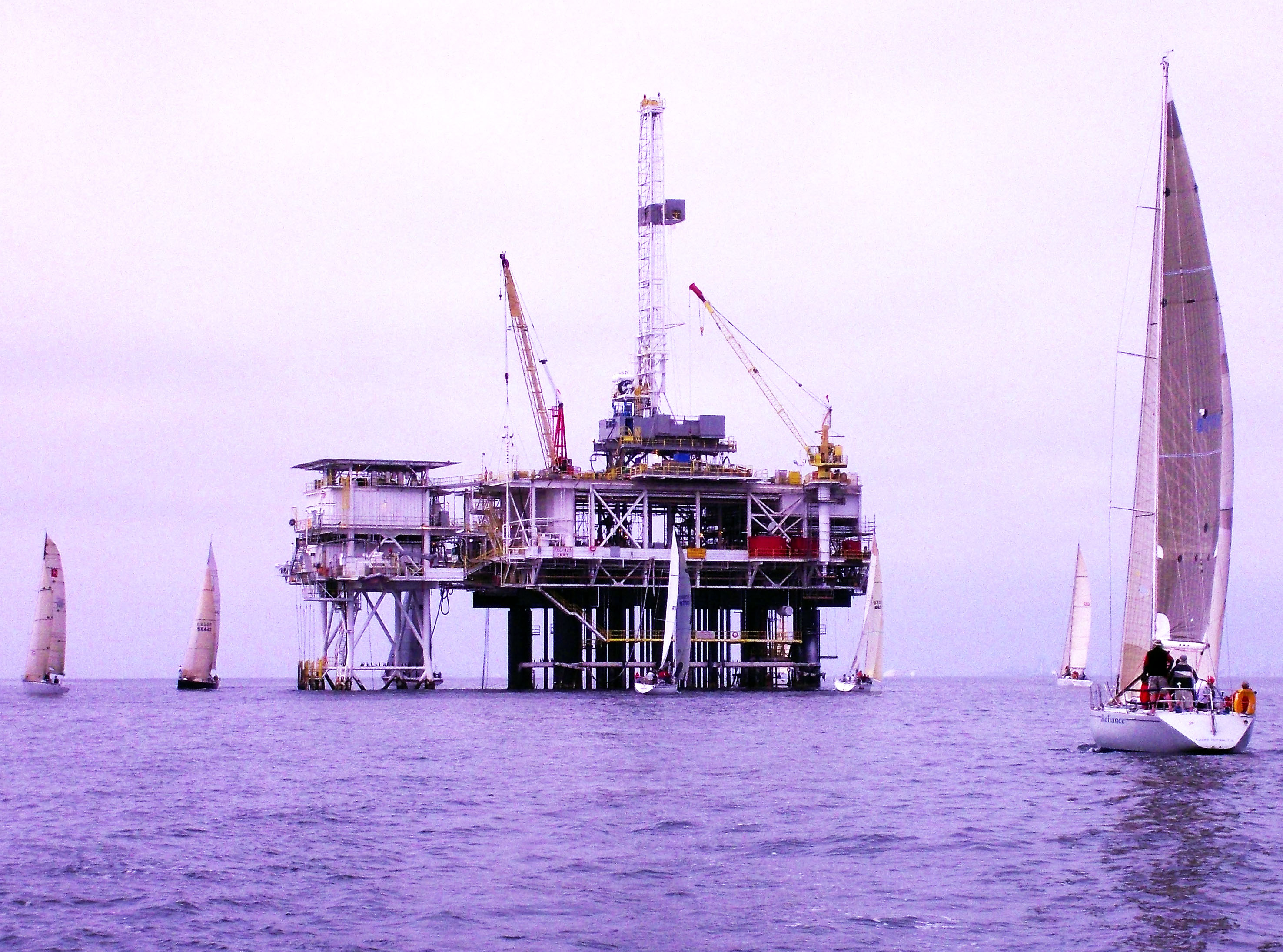
Oil platform Emmy HB, March 2013

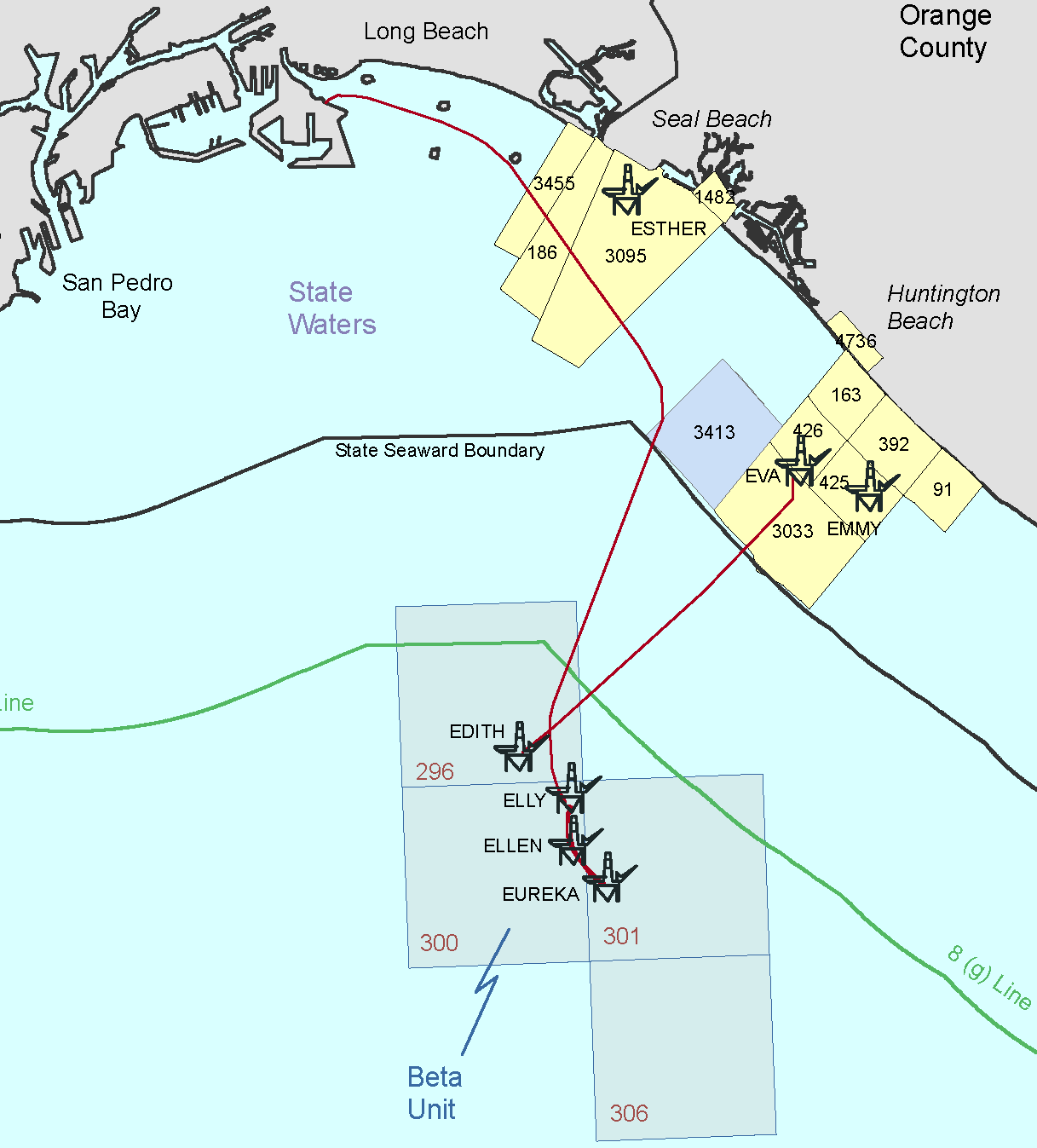
San Pedro Bay Outer Continental Shelf operations map with oil platforms as of 2012- Edith, Elly, Ellen, Eureka (federal leases) and Ester, Emmy, Eva (state leases)

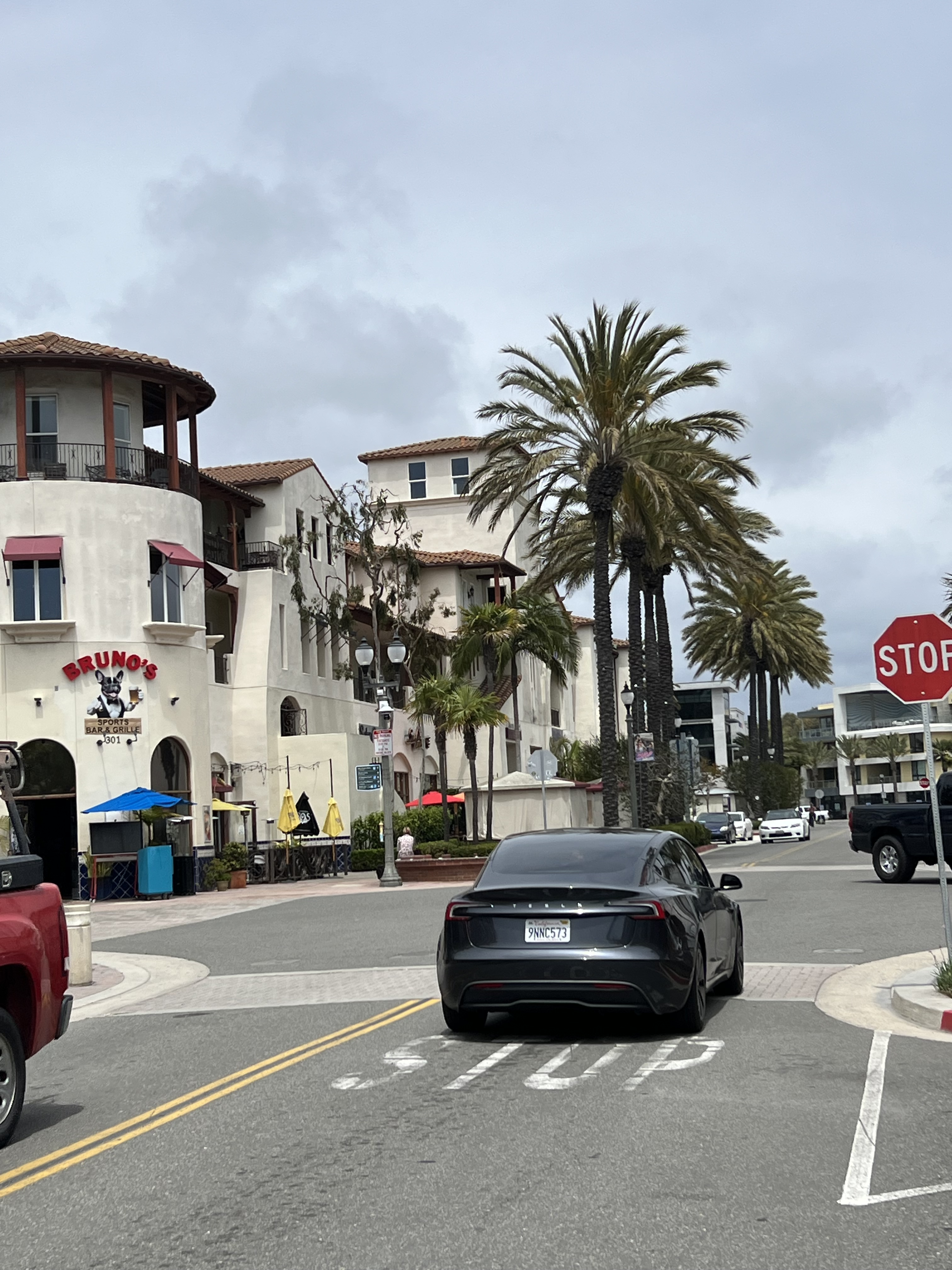
Downtown Huntington Beach

Huntington Beach sits above the Huntington Beach Oil Field, and has an off-shore oil terminus for the tankers that support the Alaska Pipeline. The terminus pipes run inland to a refinery in Santa Fe Springs. Huntington Beach also has the Gothard–Talbert terminus for the Orange County portion of the pipeline running from the Chevron El Segundo refinery. During the 2021 Orange County oil spill, more than 120,000 US gallons (450,000 L) of oil leaked from an offshore rig and began washing up on beaches in Southern California, causing ecological damage.

Shopping centers include Bella Terra, and Old World Village, a German-themed center.

Huntington Beach contains a major installation of Boeing. A number of installations on the Boeing campus were originally constructed to service the Apollo Program, and the S-IVB upper stage for the Saturn IB and Saturn V rockets.

Huntington Beach has registered "Surf City, USA", as a trademark for marketing purposes. Disputes have occurred with other municipalities who also claim the "surf city" designation.

Tourist sites include:

- International Surfing Museum.
- Huntington Beach Pier
- Newland House, Huntington Beach's oldest home, built in 1898; now a museum

Golden Bear, a nightclub, was located downtown from 1929 to 1986.

=== Top employers ===
According to Huntington Beach's 2024 Annual Comprehensive Financial Report, the top ten private employers in the city are:

Top employers in the city of Huntington Beach
#	Employer	# of employees
1	Boeing	3,112
2	Cambro Manufacturing	650
3	Hyatt Regency Huntington Beach	641
4	Huntington Beach Hospital	527
5	Walmart Inc.	462
6	No Ordinary Moments	458
7	Hilton Waterfront Beach Resort	450
8	The Home Depot	436
9	Home and Body Company	418
10	Target Corporation	351

== Arts and culture ==
=== Special events ===
Special events include:

- U.S. Open of Surfing
- Association of Volleyball Professionals beach volleyball competition
- Fourth of July parade, founded in 1904
- Huntington Beach Film Festival, occurring each February
- Pacific Airshow, featuring the Breitling Jet Team and the United States Air Force Thunderbirds
- Surf City USA marathon, founded in 1996
- Beachcruiser Meet, a classic car show
- Concours d'Elegance, an exotic car and airplane show
- Donut Derelicts, one of the oldest continuously operating car gatherings in the United States

=== Registered historic places ===
- Helme-Worthy Store and Residence
- Huntington Beach and Municipal Pier
- Huntington Beach Public Library on Triangle Park
- HB Elementary School Gymnasium and Plunge
- Newland House

=== Public libraries ===
There are five branches of the Huntington Beach Public Library. The Central Park branch is located in a building designed by Richard Neutra and Dion Neutra.

== Sports ==
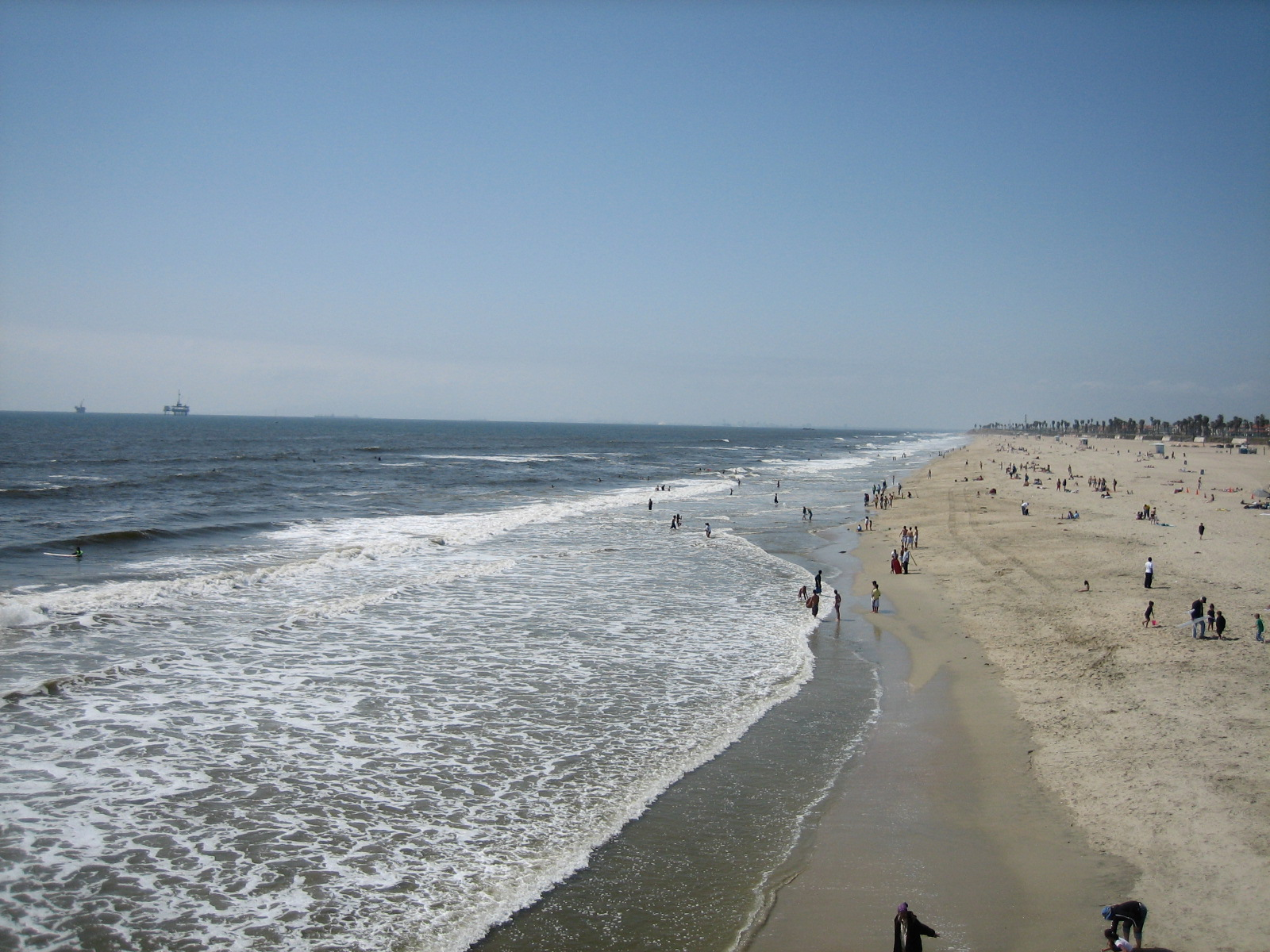
Huntington Beach

=== Surfing ===
Huntington Beach is the site of the US Open of Surfing (formerly West Coast Surfing Championships), held annually in the summer. The city is often referred to as "Surf City" and the "Surfing Capital of the World". In 1914, George Freeth was the first person to surf in Huntington Beach. Duke Kahanamoku started surfing in Huntington Beach in 1925 and helped popularize the sport. The first surfboard shop, located underneath the Huntington Beach Pier, opened in 1956. In 1996, Corky Carroll's Surf School was established at Bolsa Chica State Beach.

== Parks and recreation ==
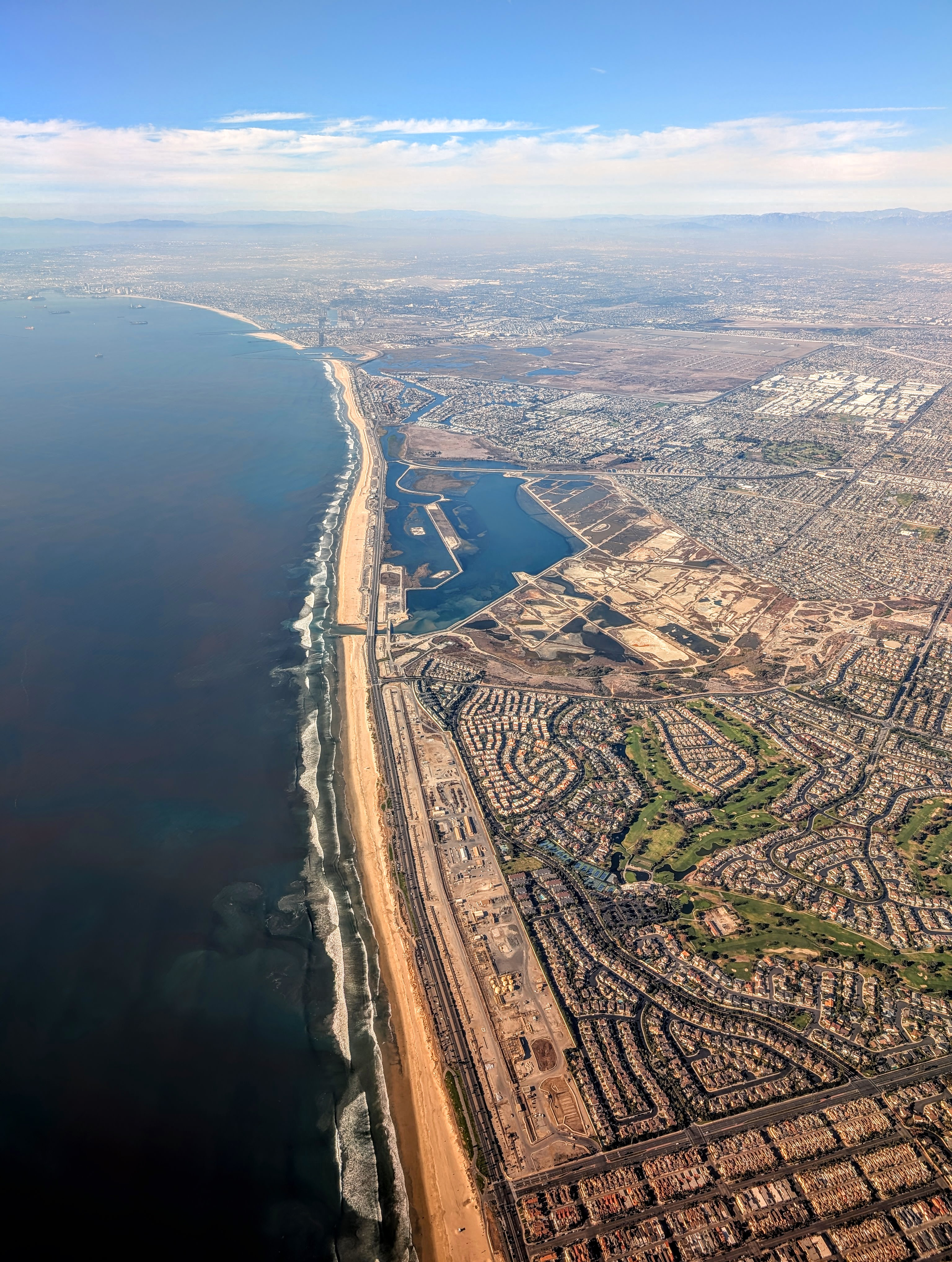
Huntington Dog Beach and Bolsa Chica Ecological Reserve

Beaches include Huntington State Beach, Bolsa Chica State Beach, and "The Cliffs" or "Huntington Dog Beach", a popular surfing location where dogs are permitted. Events include Surf City Surf Dog, and So Cal Corgi Nation Beach Days.

The Huntington Beach bicycle path stretches for 10 miles (16 km) alongside the beach.

Kayaking and standup paddleboarding occurs in Huntington Harbour, where there is watercraft rentals.

Golf courses include Meadowlark Golf Club, opened in 1922, Huntington Beach Disc Golf Course, opened in 1977, and the Huntington Club, a private country club.

=== Central Park ===
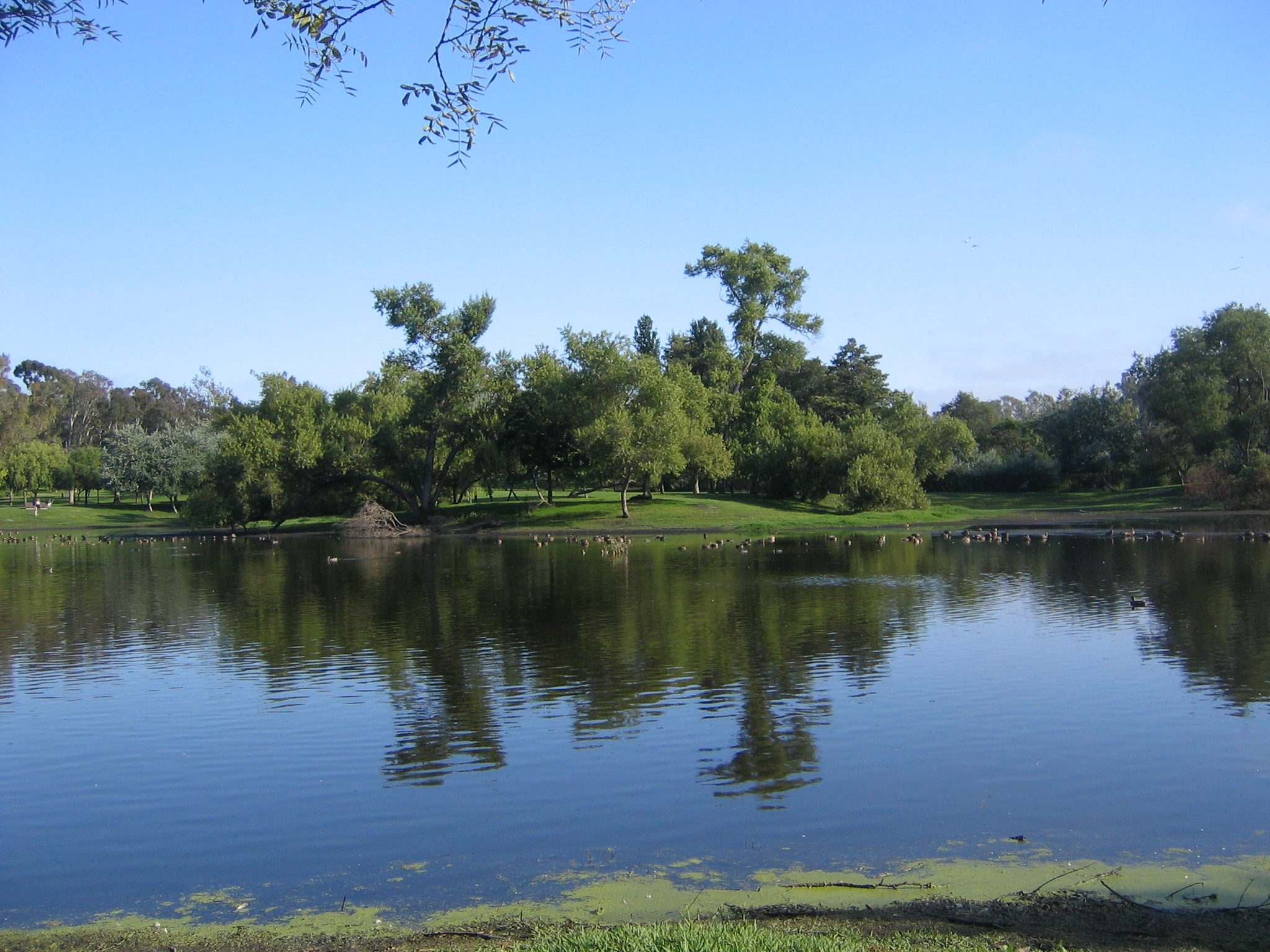
Huntington Central Park

Central Park opened in 1974, and is the largest city-owned park in Orange County, with nearly 350 acres (140 ha). The park is vegetated with xeric (low water use) plants, and inhabited by native wildlife. Thick forests encircling the park are supplemented with Australian trees, particularly Blue Gum Eucalyptus, a high water use plant. The Huntington Central Park Equestrian Center, a 25 acres (10 ha) facility boarding over 400 horses, and operates a riding school and riding facility in the park. The world's second oldest disc golf course is available in the park, as is the Shipley Nature Center.

=== Bolsa Chica Ecological Reserve ===
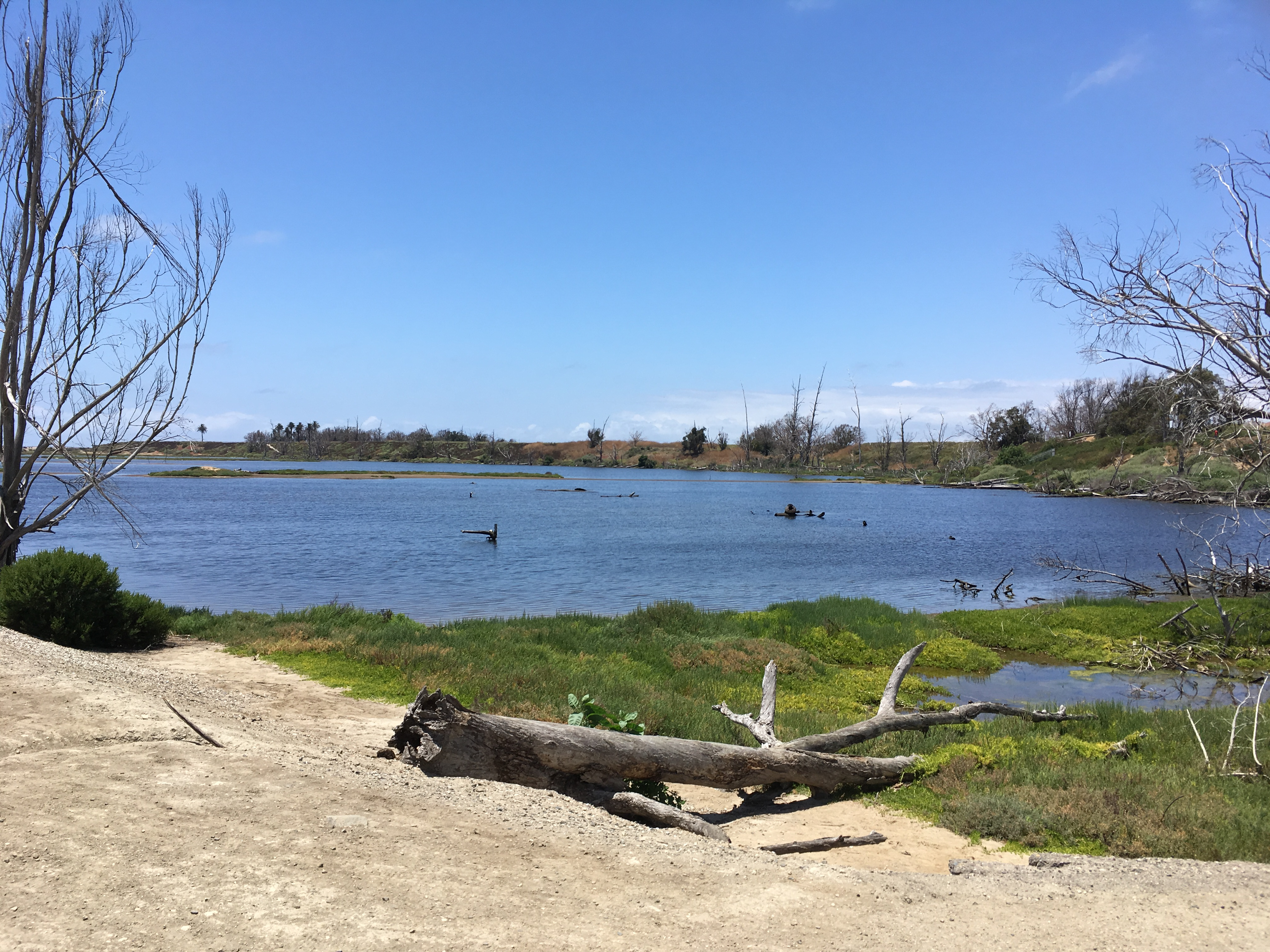
The Bolsa Chica wetlands near the Brightwater housing development

Bolsa Chica State Ecological Reserve is a natural wetland of over 1,200 acres (4.9 km^{2}) featuring walking trails, and watching birds migrating along the Pacific Flyway.

== Government ==
=== Local government ===
The following table shows the current and former mayors of Huntington Beach:

Mayor	Name	Years served
68th mayor	Pat Burns	2025–present
67th mayor	Gracey Van Der Mark	2023–2024
66th mayor	Tony Strickland	2022–2023
65th mayor	Kim Carr	2020–2021
64th mayor	Lyn Semeta	2019–2020
63rd mayor	Erik Peterson	2018–2019
62nd mayor	Mike Posey	2017–2018
61st mayor	Barbara Delgleize	2016–2017 & 2021–2022
60th mayor	Jim Katapodis	2015–2016
59th mayor	Matthew M. Harper	2013–2014
58th mayor	Donald F. Hansen	2011–2012
57th mayor	Joseph J. Carchio	2010–2011
56th mayor	Keith B. Bohr	2008–2009
55th mayor	Gilbert J. Coerper	2006–2007
54th mayor	Jill S. Hardy	2004–2005 & 2014–2015
53rd mayor	Catherine T. Green	2003–2004 & 2009–2010
52nd mayor	Constance J. Boardman	2002–2003 & 2012–2013
51st mayor	Deborah A. Cook	2001–2002 & 2007–2008
50th mayor	Pamela L. Julien Houchen	2000–2001
49th mayor	David P. Garofalo	1999–2000
48th mayor	Shirley S. Dettloff	1997–1998
47th mayor	Ralph H. Bauer	1996–1997
46th mayor	David A. Sullivan	1995–1996 & 2005–2006
45th mayor	G. Victor Leipzig	1994–1995
44th mayor	Linda L. Moulton-Patterson	1993–1994
43rd mayor	Grace H. Winchell	1992–1993
42nd mayor	James W. Silva	1991–1992
41st mayor	Peter R. Green	1990–1991 & 1998–1999
40th mayor	Tom Mays	1989–1990
39th mayor	Wesley M. Bannister	1988–1989
38th mayor	John P. Erskine	1987–1988
37th mayor	John A. Kelly Jr.	1983–1984 & 1986–1987
36th mayor	Robert P. Mandic Jr.	1993–1994
35th mayor	Ruth E. Finley	1981–1982
34th mayor	Ruth S. Bailey	1980–1981 & 1984–1985
33rd mayor	Donald A. MacAllister	1979–1980 & 1983
32nd mayor	Ronald Q. Shenkman	1978
31st mayor	Ronald R. Pattinson	1977–1978 & 1978–1979
30th mayor	Harriett M. Wieder	1976–1977
29th mayor	Norma Brandel Gibbs	1975–1976
28th mayor	Jerry A. Matney	1973–1974
27th mayor	George C. McCracken	1971–1972
26th mayor	N. John V.V. Green	1969–1970
25th mayor	Alvin M. Coen	1968–1969, 1972–1973 & 1974–1975
24th mayor	Jake R. Stewart	1966–1967
23rd mayor	Donald D. Shipley	1964–1966, 1967–1968 & 1970–1971
22nd mayor	Robert M. Lambert	1962–1964
21st mayor	Ernest H. Gisler	1960–1962
20th mayor	Earl T. Irby	1958–1960
19th mayor	Victor Terry	1956–1958
18th mayor	Roy Seabridge	1952–1956
17th mayor	Vernon E. Langenbeck	1950–1952
16th mayor	Jack Greer	1948–1950
15th mayor	Ted W. Bartlett	1946–1948
14th mayor	Marcus M. McCallen	1938–1942
13th mayor	Willis H. Warner	1936–1938
12th mayor	Thomas B. Talbert	1934–1936 & 1942–1946
11th mayor	Elson G. Conrad	1931–1934
10th mayor	Samuel R. Bowen	1928–1931
9th mayor	C.G. Booster	1926–1928
8th mayor	Lawrence Ridenhauer	1924–1926
7th mayor	Richard Drew	1922–1924
6th mayor	Joseph Vavra	1919–1920
5th mayor	W.E. Tarbox	1917–1918
4th mayor	Matthew E. Helme	1916–1917
3rd mayor	E.E. French	1914–1916 & 1918–1919
2nd mayor	W.D. Seeley	1912–1914
1st mayor	Ed Manning	1909–1912 & 1920–1922

=== Politics ===
In the Orange County Board of Supervisors, Huntington Beach is in the First District, and is represented by Republican Janet Nguyen.

In the California State Senate, Huntington Beach is in the 36th senatorial district, represented by Republican Tony Strickland. In the California State Assembly, it is split between the 70th Assembly district, represented by Republican Tri Ta, and the 72nd Assembly district, represented by Republican Diane Dixon.

In the United States House of Representatives, Huntington Beach is in California's 47th congressional district, represented by Democrat Dave Min.

Huntington Beach is considered highly conservative at the local level, and in 2022 passed several conservative resolutions including banning the Pride flag on city property and requiring voter ID at the polls. In 2024, under the previous block voting system, conservatives gained complete control of the city council by ousting the remaining left-leaning city councilors, giving conservatives a 7–0 majority.

In June 2026, a judge in Huntington Beach required the city council to be elected all at once using ranked-choice voting, marking the first time in the US when a judge has specifically ordered the use of single transferable vote (proportional ranked-choice voting) to settle a state voting rights act dispute (as opposed to a city opting to use STV over single-winner races after the old system was struck down).

According to the California secretary of state, as of October 21, 2024, Huntington Beach has 135,216 registered voters. Of those, 55,565 (42%) are registered Republicans, 41,606 (32%) are registered Democrats, and 34,458 (26%) have declined to state a political party/are American Independents/Libertarian/Green. Huntington Beach has the highest number of registered Libertarians in the county, owing perhaps to its conservative nature.

Huntington Beach city vote by party in presidential elections
Year	Democratic	Republican	Third parties
2024	44.20% 47,971	53.0% 57,541	2.80% 3,056
2020	47.24% 55,481	50.47% 59,279	2.29% 2,685
2016	43.28% 40,980	49.65% 47,007	7.07% 6,689
2012	40.86% 37,093	56.37% 51,166	2.77% 2,512
2008	45.15% 42,622	52.47% 49,528	2.38% 2,251
2004	38.80% 35,206	59.90% 54,343	1.30% 1,182
2000	38.53% 31,800	56.63% 46,742	4.84% 3,998
1996	36.72% 28,044	51.07% 39,004	12.20% 9,320
1992	31.16% 27,648	41.54% 36,867	27.30% 24,227
1988	31.33% 24,544	67.51% 52,878	1.16% 906
1984	24.77% 17,985	74.05% 53,772	1.18% 860
1980	22.88% 15,967	66.22% 46,206	10.90% 7,602
1976	35.77% 20,526	62.51% 35,870	1.72% 988
1972	27.57% 15,142	68.25% 37,483	4.18% 2,298
1968	31.06% 11,199	61.30% 22,107	7.64% 2,755
1964	49.18% 10,168	50.82% 10,509	

== Education ==
=== Public schools ===
Huntington Beach is the home of Golden West College, which offers two-year associates of arts degrees and transfer programs to four-year universities.

Huntington Beach is in the Huntington Beach Union High School District, which includes:

- Edison High School
- Huntington Beach High School
- Marina High School
- Ocean View High School

The district also has an independent study school, Coast High School.

The city has four elementary school districts: Huntington Beach City School District with 9 schools and Ocean View School District with 15. A small part of the city is also served by the Fountain Valley School District and Westminster School District.

=== Private schools ===
- Grace Lutheran School
- Huntington Christian School
- The Pegasus School

== Media ==
The public television station KOCE-TV operates from the Golden West College campus.

The Wave Section of the Orange County Register covers Huntington Beach.

== Infrastructure ==
=== Transportation ===
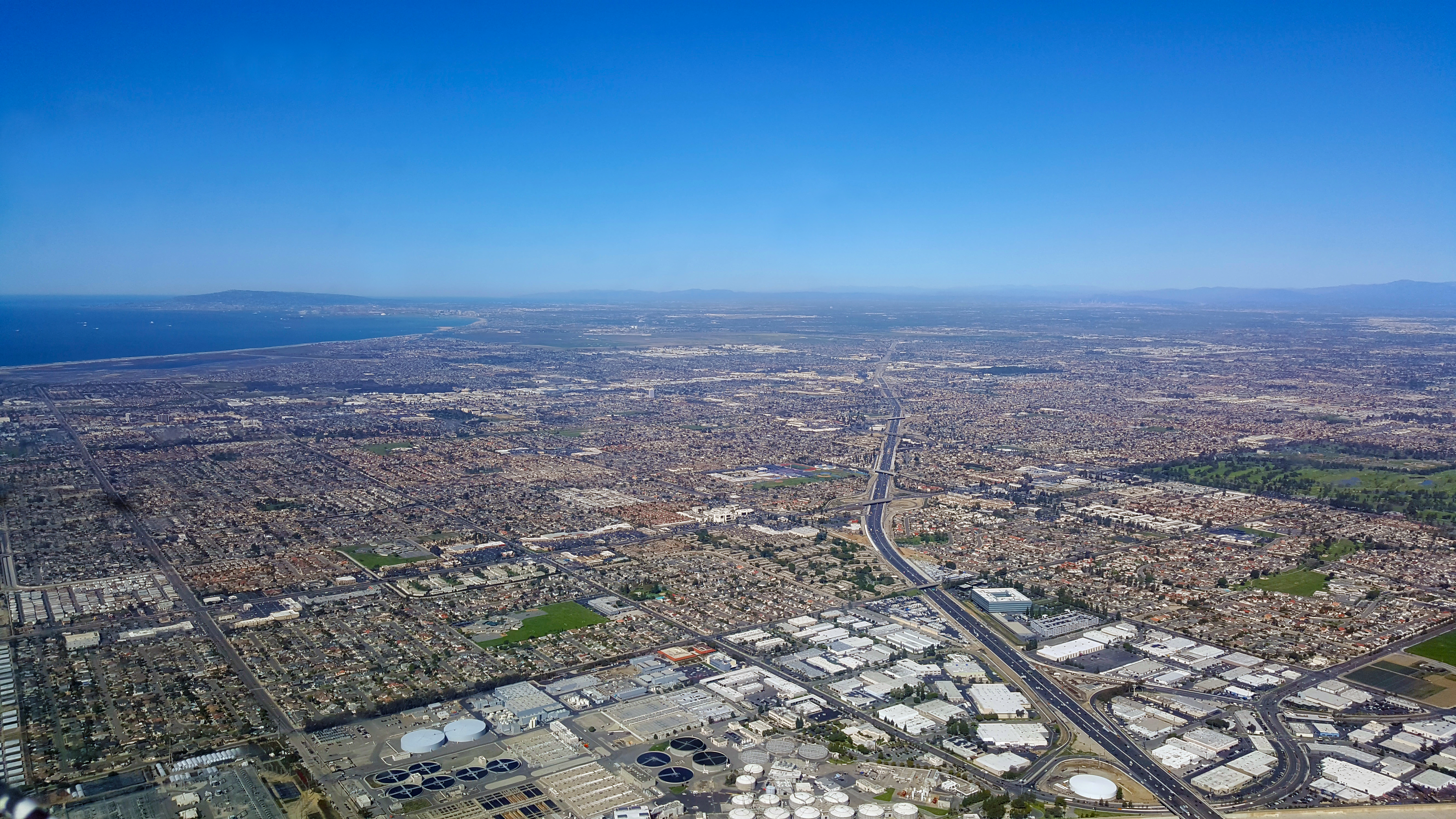
Huntington Beach and Fountain Valley from over Costa Mesa

Huntington Beach has 1,121 lane miles of public streets.

Highways include Interstate 405, and Beach Boulevard (SR 39).

The Orange County Transportation Authority operates 14 bus routes in Huntington Beach.

Most Huntington Beach households have at least one car. In 2016, 2.2 percent of Huntington Beach households lacked a car; the national average was 8.7 percent. Huntington Beach averaged two cars per household in 2016; the national average was 1.8.

=== Health care ===
Huntington Beach is served by Huntington Beach Hospital.

=== Public safety ===
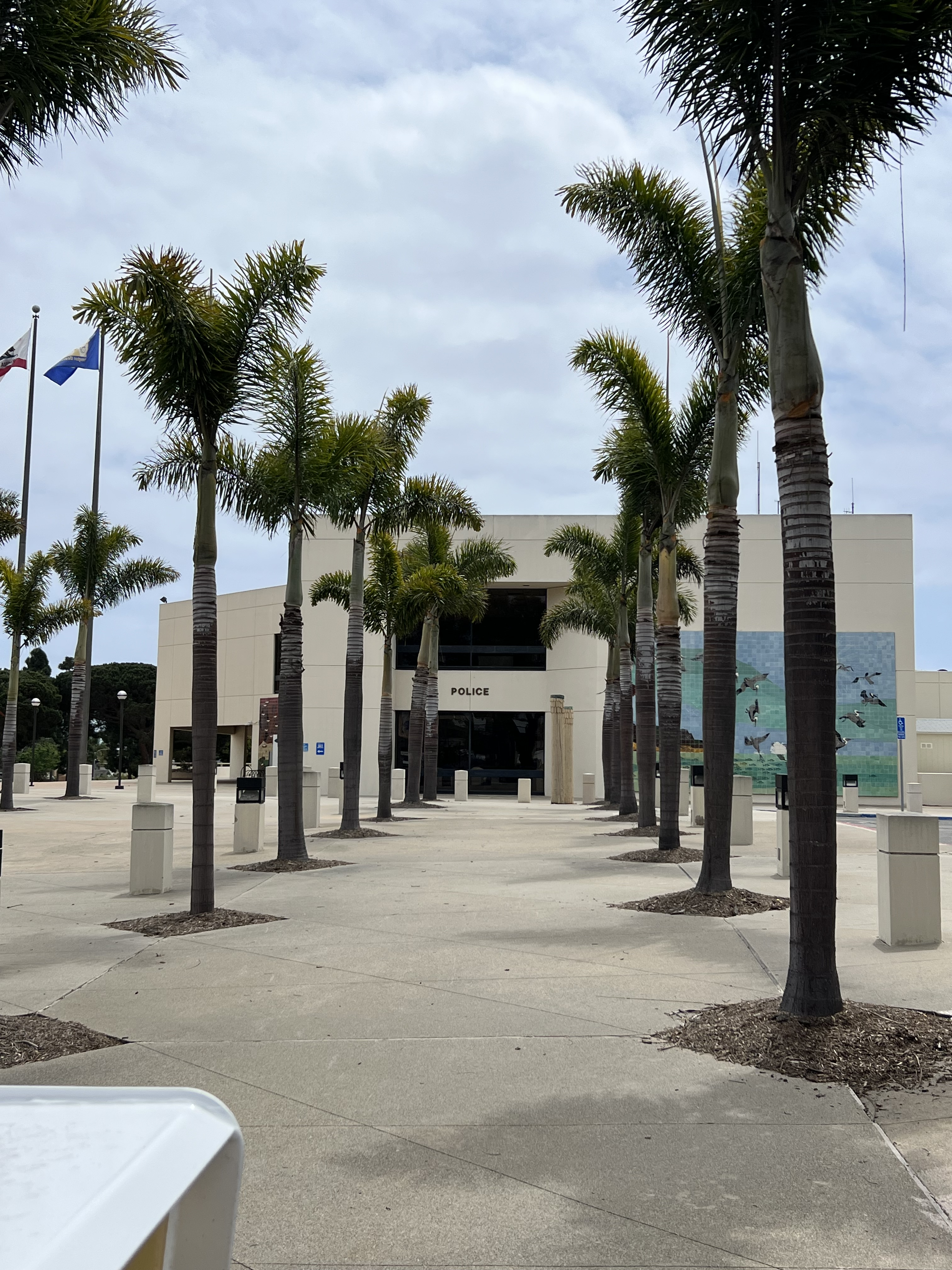
Huntington Beach Police Department

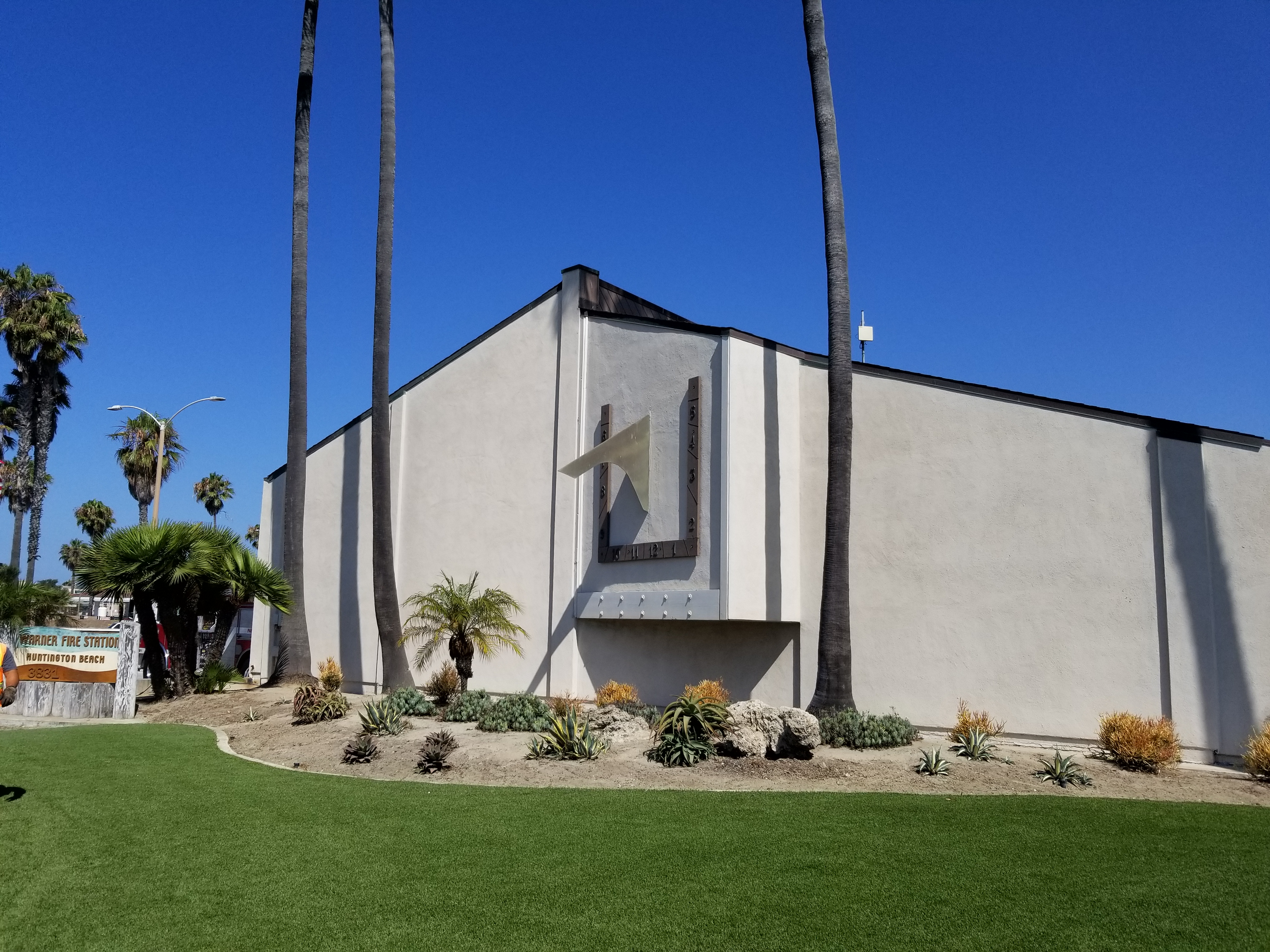
Warner Fire Station near Bolsa Chica State Beach and its sundial

Law enforcement is provided by the Huntington Beach Police Department.

The Huntington Beach Fire Department was founded in 1909 with 20 volunteers. The department provides fire protection, emergency medical services, medical transport, marine safety, and lifeguards.

The local oil has such extreme mercury contamination that metallic mercury is regularly drained from oil pipelines and equipment. Oil operations increase when the price of oil rises. Some oil fields have been approved for development. The worst-polluted areas have been reclaimed as parks. At least one Superfund site, too contaminated to be a park, is here. On October 2, 2021, an oil spill occurred after a pipe burst, sending oil into the ocean and on the beach.

=== Water services ===
Water in Huntington Beach is supplied by the City of Huntington Beach Public Works Utilities Division, which sources its water from the Metropolitan Water District of Southern California via Municipal Water District of Orange County. This water is imported from Northern California and the Colorado River. Additionally, groundwater is sourced from nine city wells tapped into an underground aquifer managed by Orange County Water District.

== In popular culture ==
Huntington Beach has been used as a location or setting for many films, television programs, fashion shoots and music videos.

- The city is mentioned in The Beach Boys 1962 hit song "Surfin' Safari".
- In 1963, Jan and Dean released "Surf City" in reference to Huntington Beach. Dean Torrence later helped convince elected officials to officially nickname the city Surf City in 1991.
- The city was used as a filming location in 1991 for the TV series White Men Can't Jump.
- In 2008, Huntington Beach was used as a filming location for the movie 2012.
- The beach and Hyatt Regency Hotel were used in 2011 as filming locations for the TV series 90210.
- In 2011, scenes for the pilot of the movie Graceland were filmed in Huntington Beach.
- Huntington Lake in Huntington Central Park and 'Don the Beachcomber' restaurant were used as filming locations for Season 8 of the TV series Dexter.
- The pier was used as a filming location in 2012 for The X Factor.
- The pier was used as a filming location in 2015 for Season 10 of It's Always Sunny in Philadelphia.
- In 2018, a surf scene was filmed in Huntington Beach for Season 4 of Dwayne Johnson's HBO show Ballers.
- The city was used as a filming location in 2020 and 2021 for Season 11 of the American TV series Shameless
- The city was used as a filming location between 2021 and 2022 for the TV series The Real Housewives of Orange County, Selling the OC, and The Terminal List.
- Huntington Beach was used as a main filming location in 2022 and 2023 for the TV series 9-1-1: Lone Star.
- In 2023, the city was used as a filming location for the TV series Black Cake.
- Scenes from 90 Day Fiancé were filmed in Huntington Beach in 2024.
- In 2025, scenes from Season 3 of the American TV series Love on the Spectrum were filmed in Huntington Beach.

== Sister cities ==
- Anjo, Aichi, Japan
- Manly, New South Wales, Australia (unofficial)

== See also ==
- Historic Wintersburg in Huntington Beach, California
- Largest cities in Southern California
- Brethren Christian Junior/Senior High School, a former school
