= David Sullivan =

David or Dave Sullivan may refer to:

- Dave Sullivan (boxer) (1877–1929), Irish-American boxer
- David Sullivan (labor leader) (1904–1976), American labor leader
- David O. Sullivan (c. 1924–2012), American intelligence officer
- David Sullivan (businessman) (born 1949), British pornographic magazine publisher and football club owner
- David B. Sullivan (born 1953), member of the Massachusetts House of Representatives
- Dave Sullivan (wrestler) (born 1960), American professional wrestler
- Dave Sullivan (California politician), mayor of Huntington Beach, California
- Dave Sullivan (Illinois politician) (born 1964), former Illinois State Senator
- David Sullivan (footballer) (born 1966), Australian rules footballer
- David Sullivan (actor) (born 1977), American film and television actor
- David Sullivan (judge), American justice of the Supreme Court of Mississippi

== See also ==
- David O'Sullivan (disambiguation)
