= Huntington Christian School =

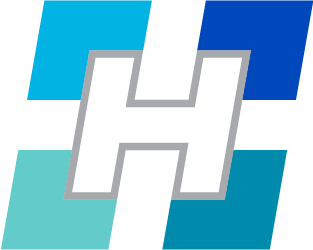

Location
- Huntington Beach, California; United States; Maps 33.6616°N 117.9587°W

Information
- Type: Private Christian school
- Religious affiliation: Christian
- Established: 1981
- Grades: Preschool–8
- Enrollment: 501 (2019–20)
- Student to teacher ratio: 12:1
- Campus type: Suburban
- Athletics: Basketball, volleyball, flag football, soccer, golf
- Affiliations: Christian Athletic League of Orange County
- Website: www.huntingtonchristian.com

Huntington Christian School (HCS) is a private Christian K–8 school in Huntington Beach, California, United States. It operates as a ministry of the First Christian Church of Huntington Beach and offers preschool through eighth-grade education, incorporating Christian teachings. Its main campus is located at Levee Drive, Huntington Beach.

== History ==
Huntington Christian School was established in 1981 as a ministry of the First Christian Church of Huntington Beach to provide education from a Christian perspective in Orange County. It began with kindergarten through second grade and later expanded to include elementary and middle school programs.

In 2002, HCS relocated to a seven-acre (304,920 sq ft) campus at 9700 Levee Drive, Huntington Beach. In 2007, the school was among two private Christian schools negotiating lease renewals with the Huntington Beach City School District. The following year, the district approved a 30-year lease allowing HCS to occupy the former Burke Elementary School site for an annual rent of approximately $430,000. Since 2002, the school has operated at the Burke campus, serving around 500 students in grades K–8.

In 2013, the school hosted Rev. Gary Beard, who portrayed George Washington and presented a reproduction of Rembrandt Peale’s portrait of the first U.S. president.

In 2020, the Orange County Department of Education granted HCS a waiver to resume in-person instruction during the COVID-19 pandemic.

== Campus ==
The main includes classrooms, a chapel, a multipurpose room, science and computer facilities, a STEAM and maker lab, athletic fields, and playgrounds. The preschool campus, Pierside Preschool, is located at 1207 Main Street, Huntington Beach, and serves children ages three to six.

== Academics ==
The school provides instruction in English, mathematics, science, social studies, music, art, and physical education, along with Bible and character education. HCS also offers programs addressing social, emotional, and spiritual development, and incorporates technology and Christian principles in its curriculum. The curriculum follows California state standards and includes enrichment programs in STEAM and Spanish for upper elementary grades.

== Student life ==
Students participate in chapel services, community service, and extracurricular programs, including music, art, drama, and athletics. The school organizes service activities and field trips to promote engagement within the local community.

Students have received recognition for community service and public safety efforts. In 2015, student Gifford Price, a Huntington Beach Junior Lifeguard, saved a girl who was struggling in a rip current off Huntington Beach.

In 2018, the school hosted a Serve-A-Thon event where students participated in volunteer projects benefiting community organizations.

In 2023, sixth-grade student Miller Ruiz won a statewide contest held by the California Department of Transportation and the Office of Traffic Safety to name Caltrans’ safety mascot “Safety Sam”.

== Athletics ==
HCS offers interscholastic sports including basketball, volleyball, flag football, soccer, roller hockey, surf team, and golf. Middle school teams compete in the Christian Athletic League of Orange County. Physical education classes follow the SPARK program developed by San Diego State University.

== Governance and accreditation ==
The school is governed by a board appointed by the Elders of the First Christian Church of Huntington Beach, which oversees policy, curriculum, and financial planning. Daily operations are managed by school leadership.

HCS is listed as a private, non-public school in the California School Directory and is accredited by the Accrediting Commission for Schools, Western Association of Schools and Colleges (ACS WASC). It is also affiliated with the Association of Christian Schools International (ACSI).

== Enrollment and demographics ==
According to the National Center for Education Statistics (2019–20), HCS enrolled 501 students. The student body was 64.3 percent White, 9.2 percent Asian, and 1.8 percent Hispanic.
