= David O'Sullivan =

David O'Sullivan may refer to:

- Dave O'Sullivan (horse trainer) (1933–2024), New Zealand horse trainer
- David O'Sullivan (cricketer, born 1944), New Zealand cricketer
- David O'Sullivan (civil servant) (born 1953), Irish civil servant for the European Union
- David O'Sullivan (hurler) (born 1988), Irish hurler
- David O'Sullivan (cricketer, born 1997), Australian-born Welsh cricketer
- David O'Sullivan (bowler), American ten-pin bowler
- David O'Sullivan, character in Black and White

== See also ==
- David Sullivan (disambiguation)
