= The Pegasus School =

Location
- 19692 Lexington Lane; Huntington Beach, California 92646; United States; 33°40′37″N 117°56′50″W

Information
- School type: Private-Independent Day School
- Motto: Where Bright Minds Soar
- Established: 1984
- Founder: Laura Hathaway
- Status: Open
- Head of school: Dr. Regina McDuffie
- Grades: Pre-K-Grade 8
- Gender: Co-Ed
- Enrollment: 565
- Average class size: 20
- Student to teacher ratio: 1:11
- Campus size: 14 acres (57,000 m^{2})
- Color
- Mascot: Pegasus
- Team name: Thunder
- Accreditation: The California Association of Independent Schools
- Publication: Pegasus Magazine
- Communities served: Suburban
- Affiliations: National Association of Independent Schools (NAIS), Educational Records Bureau (ERB)
- Website: thepegasusschool.org

The Pegasus School is a co-ed, non-profit, non-sectarian, private day school on a 14-acre (5.7 ha) campus in Huntington Beach, California.

== History ==
In 1984, Laura Hathaway founded The Pegasus School.

The school purchased its current facility in 1995 and then began work to refurbish classrooms and expand buildings. The Palley Complex, which serves fourth and fifth graders, was added in 1997 and the Hathaway Activities Center was built in 2000 to provide a home for performance, art, and student athletics. Since then the school has also added the Kazu Fukuda Science and Technology Center in 2020 and the Geisler Family WINGS building in 2024.

Laura Hathaway was the first head of school. John Zurn was appointed the second head of The Pegasus School in February 2010. Jason Lopez joined the Pegasus community in July 2014 as the third head of school, and Dr. Regina McDuffie began as the fourth Head of School in 2024.

== Average class size ==
Pre-Kindergarten:16 students in a classroom with two teachers

Kindergarten: 18 students in a classroom with a teacher and associate teacher

First through Fifth grades: 20 students per classroom with a teacher and teaching assistant

Sixth through Eighth Grades: 16-18 students in a classroom with a teacher and teaching assistant.

== Recognitions ==
The Pegasus School is a nationally recognized blue ribbon school

== Environmental aspects ==
The school is an energy star pledge participant.
