= Huntington Beach Pier =

- Huntington Beach Municipal Pier
- U.S. National Register of Historic Places
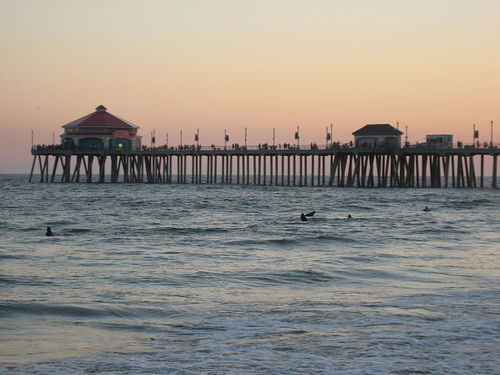
- Location: Main St. and Pacific Coast Highway; Huntington Beach, California
- Coordinates: 33.655093°N 118.004193°W
- Architect: Moffatt & Nichol Engineers (moffattnichol.com)
- NRHP reference No.: 89001203
- Added to NRHP: August 24, 1989

The Huntington Beach Pier is a municipal pier located in Huntington Beach, California, at the west end of Main Street and west of Pacific Coast Highway. At 1,850 ft (560 m) in length, it is one of the longest public piers on the West Coast of the United States. (The Oceanside Pier at 1,942 ft (592 m) is the longest.) The deck of the pier is 30 ft (9.1 m) above sea level, while the top of the restaurant structure at the end of the pier is 77 ft (23 m).

The Huntington Beach Pier is on the California Register of Historical Resources. It is one of 123 historic places and districts listed on the National Register of Historic Places in Orange County, California (Ref. No. 89001203).

One of the main landmarks of Huntington Beach, also known as "Surf City, USA", the pier is the center of the city's prominent beach culture. A popular meeting place for surfers, the ocean waves here are enhanced by a natural effect caused by the edge-diffraction of open-ocean swells around Catalina Island, creating consistent surf year-round.

== History ==
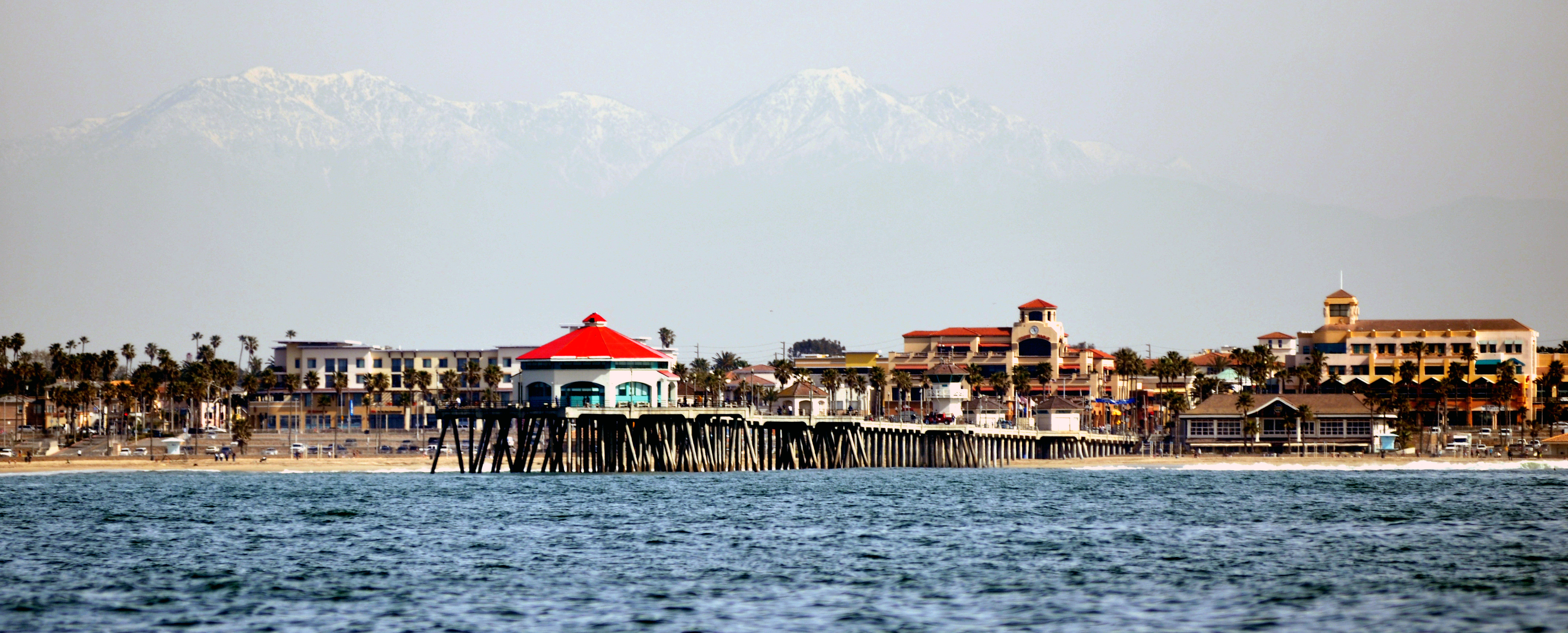
The Pier from a boat

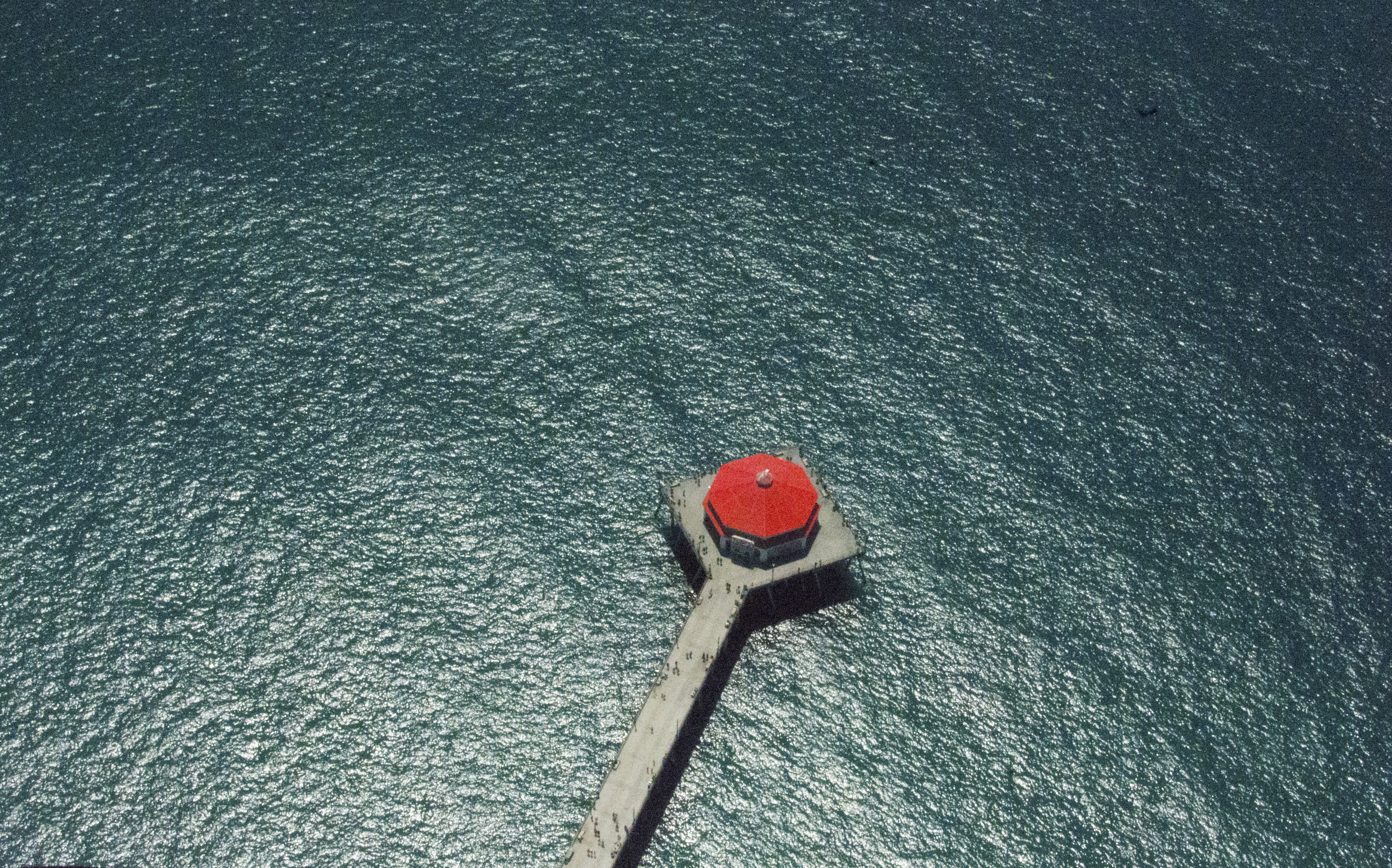
The Pier from the air

The pier was built circa 1902, before Huntington Beach was incorporated in 1909. The Huntington Beach Company built a wooden pier at the terminus of Main Street in 1904, which extended 1,000 feet (300 m) into the Pacific Ocean. In 1910, it was damaged by a severe storm that caused a large portion of it to plunge into the Pacific. The Huntington Beach Township's board of trustees approved a $70,000 bond in 1911 to construct a new pier made of concrete extending 1,350 feet (410 m) in length.

The newly constructed pier was re-dedicated in 1914 and set a record at that time as the longest and highest concrete pleasure pier in the United States. Legendary surfer George Freeth provided a surfing demonstration at the pier re-dedication.

In 1931, the city extended the pier by 500 feet (150 m) and added the Sunshine Cafe at the end. The extension separated from the original pier during the 1933 Long Beach earthquake. Repairs were made by the City of Huntington Beach, but the pier was damaged again by the 1939 California tropical storm. Reconstruction of the pier was completed a year later.

After the attack by Japan at Pearl Harbor, Hawaii, on December 7, 1941, Huntington Beach, along with many other coastal cities, mobilized to help the war effort. The U.S. Navy installed a submarine lookout post on the pier, along with a heavy caliber machine gun. When the war was over, all military equipment was removed and the pier was returned for public use. In 1983 and on 7 January 1988, Pacific storms destroyed the pier and the "End Cafe". Fluor/Daniel Consultants of Irvine conducted a study on the structural stability of the pier and the pier was declared unsafe. It was closed in July of that year. A community group called P.I.E.R. (Persons Interested in Expediting Reconstruction) was organized to raise funds for the pier's reconstruction. P.I.E.R. raised over $100,000 by selling T-shirts and other merchandise with the P.I.E.R. logo. An additional $92,000 was donated by the community of Anjo, Japan, a Huntington Beach Sister City.

Construction of a new 1,856-foot pier began in October 1990. The pier was completed and re-dedicated on 18 July 1992, with a ribbon-cutting ceremony. Over 500,000 people attended the re-dedication and grand re-opening. The City of Huntington Beach established a management and observation program to maintain the pier, an iconic feature for the community.

The pier was added to the U.S. National Register of Historic Places (NRHP) on August 24, 1989, deeming the structure worthy of preservation by the federal government. The pier was reconstructed once more, removing some of the architectural features in 1992, including Neptune's Locker and a bait shop.

== Engineering ==
The pier at sunset

The design of the present-day pier replicates the architectural form of the 1914 design. The concrete pier incorporates reinforced steel, coated with epoxy, to protect it from the corrosive effect of the damp salt air. It is also built to withstand 31-foot (9.4 m) waves or a 7.0 magnitude earthquake and uses an increased space between piles to accommodate surfers - as requested by the City. The pier slopes gently up toward the seaward end in a straight line which alternates with three octagonal platforms and one rotated square (108 feet on a side) that forms a diamond at the pier's seaward end. Not only is the pier structurally sound, it also retains a number of design elements from the original pier including haunches at the pile caps and corbels supporting light standards.

== Uses and features ==
Ruby's Diner Huntington Beach at sunset

The pier is frequented by sport fishermen as well as surfing spectators. Ruby's Diner was established at the end of the pier in 1996, and closed in late February 2021. The location was then briefly occupied by Bud & Gene's, a casual pop-up seafood restaurant that opened in July 2022. This was short lived, and Bud & Gene's was replaced in August 2023 by the Broad Street Oyster Company.

Strolling the pier is a popular pastime for both local residents and visitors. The pier has a midnight curfew, two hours after the beach closes to the public. During curfew, there are public safety patrols on the beach and at the pier. Prohibited on the pier are riding bikes and skateboards, smoking, and possession and/or consumption of drugs or alcohol. The City of Huntington Beach operates a 24-hour webcam with a view on the pier, looking west.

The City of Huntington Beach beach headquarters provides beach conditions and surf reports are updated throughout the day on the City of Huntington Beach website and at an automated phone line (714-536-9303). The reports include surf, water, wind, and tide information such as surf height, water temperature, and wind speed, and high and low tide times.

== Special events ==
The annual U.S. Open of Surfing is held on the south side of the pier every summer, hosted by Vans and formerly sponsored by companies such as Hurley, Nike, Converse, and others. It is the largest surfing competition in the world and typically lasts one week. As part of the event, notable people in the world of surfing are also inducted into the Surfing Walk of Fame and the Surfers' Hall of Fame, both located directly across from the pier on Main Street. The Surfing Walk of Fame incorporates embedded plaques in the Main Street sidewalk; the Surfers' Hall of Fame incorporates the surfer's own hand prints.

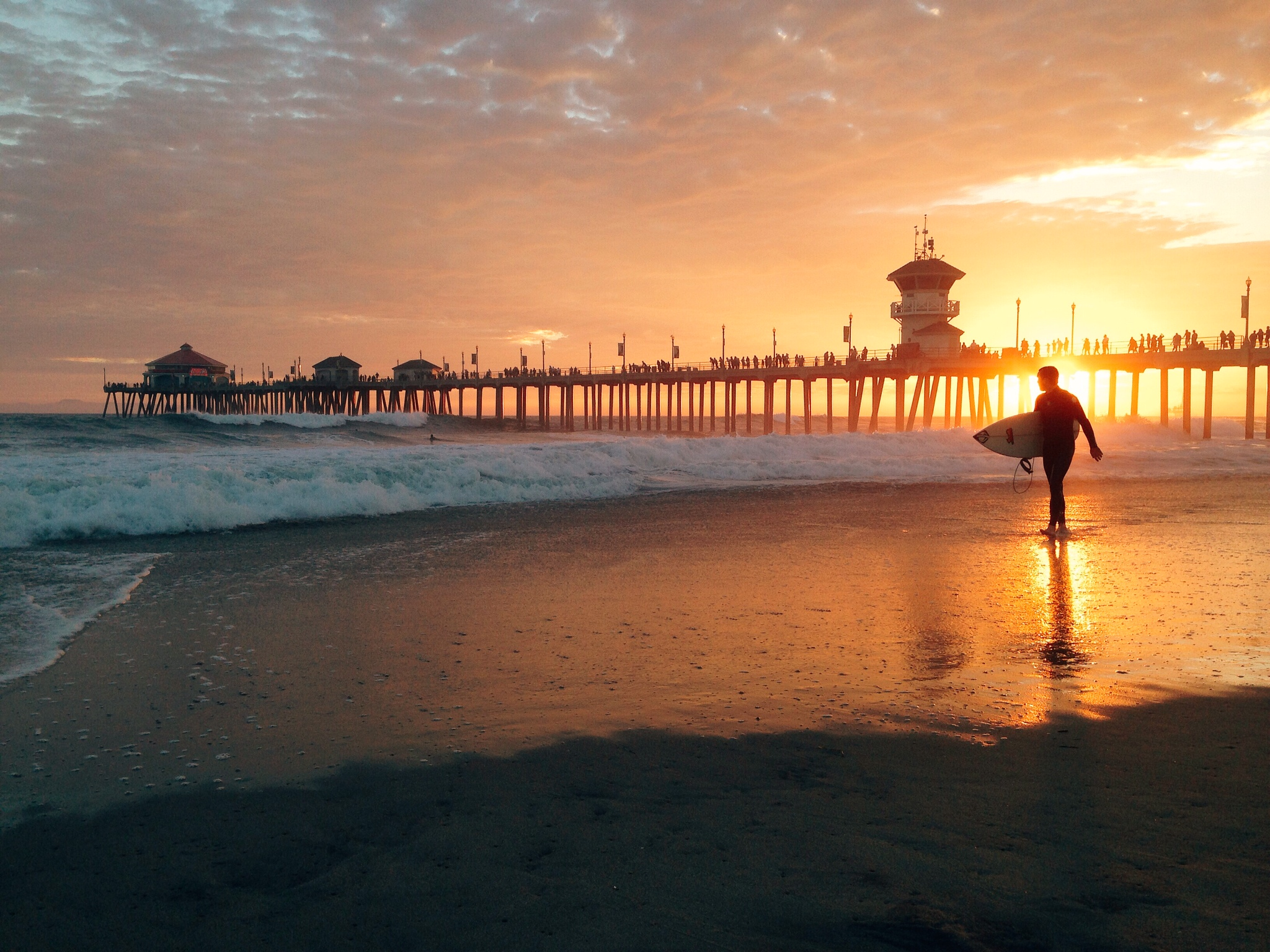
Sunset at Huntington Beach Pier in 2014

The pier also features many other events throughout the year, though most occur in the summer. Many other surfing competitions are held here like the PSA, NASSA, and CSA. Tournaments are also held for other sports such as volleyball, wrestling, BMX, kite flying, paintballing, and fishing. Races and marathons such as the Surf City Marathon & Half Marathon, which is held every Super Bowl Sunday and the Surf City 10, which is in October pass by the pier. The city also hosts an Annual Pier Swim and Rough Water Swim in which participants have to swim around the pier. There are also fireworks and parades to celebrate the Fourth of July.

== Film and television ==
Huntington Beach and its pier have been popular locations for films and television shows. Television shows include 90210 from The CW, NBC show Betty White's Off Their Rockers, and The X Factor. The area has also been featured in the Bravo show, The Real Housewives of Orange County.

== See also ==
- Santa Monica Pier: An iconic pier in Santa Monica, California
