= Meadowlark Airport =

Former airport in Southern California, USA

- IATA: L16; ICAO: none

Summary
- Location: Huntington Beach, California
- Elevation AMSL: 27 ft / 8 m
- Coordinates: 33.719°N 118.037°W
- Interactive map of Meadowlark Airport

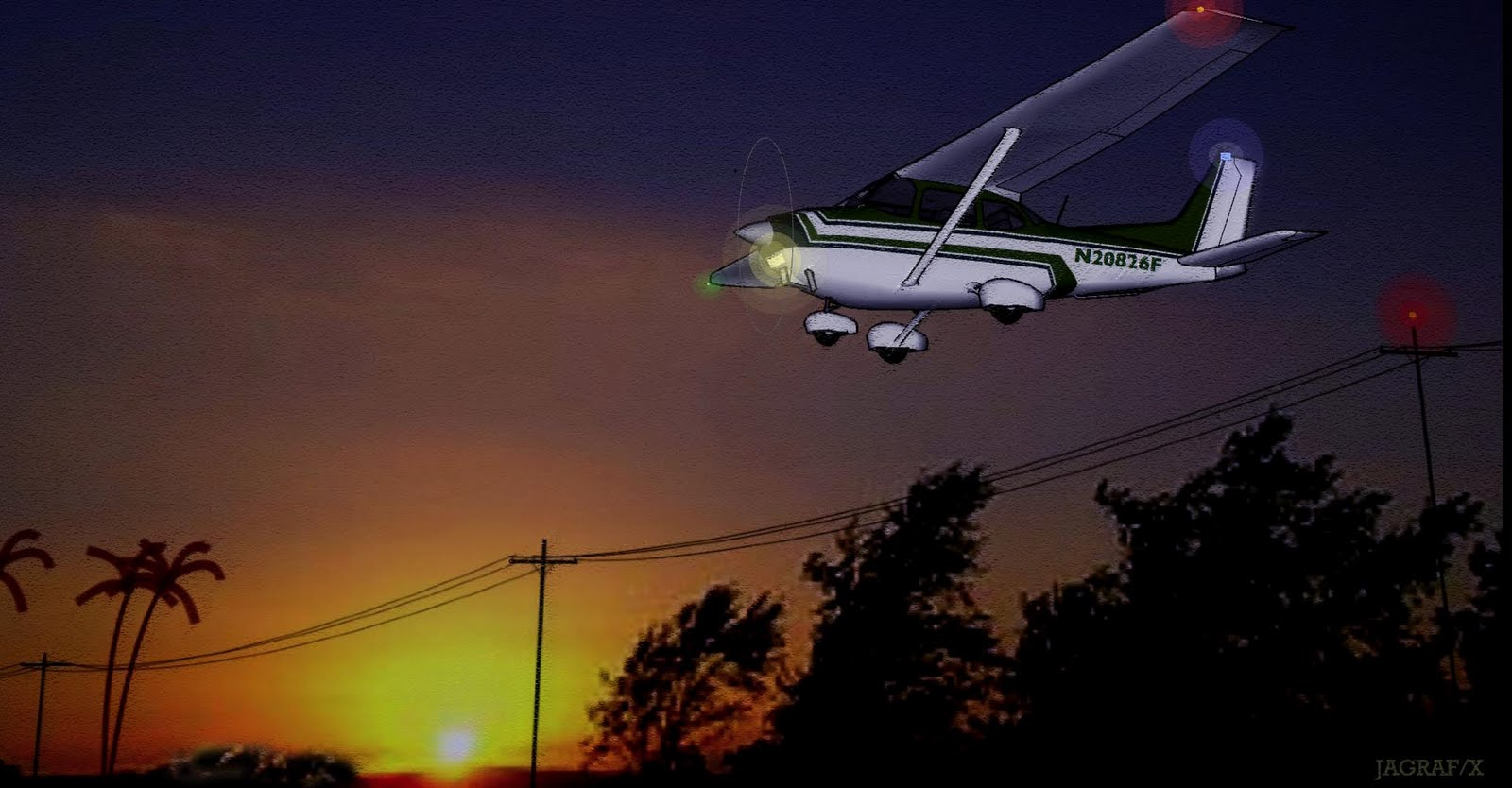
Cessna 172 landing at Meadowlark Airport

Meadowlark Airport was a small general aviation airport in Southern California, United States, about a mile east of the Pacific Ocean in Huntington Beach. Meadowlark's IATA airport code was L16. The airport operated privately in the 1940s and operated publicly from the 1950s until 1989.

== History ==
Meadowlark Airport was purchased in 1947 by the Koichi and Toyo Nerio family, and their children, Art, Yukio and Betty. The eldest son Art Nerio managed the airport from 1970 until its closure in 1989, and could be identified as a lone bicycle-riding figure keeping an eye on things around the 80-acre airfield.

When the airport opened, several other small airfields were listed nearby, including Huntington Beach Airport, a small field with one hangar and fuel facilities built on a peat marsh in east Huntington Beach. Meadowlark Airport was initially a short strip used mostly by students to practice touch and go landings. The runway was first extended to 1,750 feet (530 m) and paved, and then further extended to 2,070 feet (630 m) with room for 150 aircraft. A few hangars, a restaurant, and fuel facilities were also added. The airport was between Heil Avenue and Warner Avenue. Plaza Lane is a small street that runs through where the runway used to be.

Nerio planned to develop the airport into commercial buildings, offices and residential units.

== Meadowlark today ==
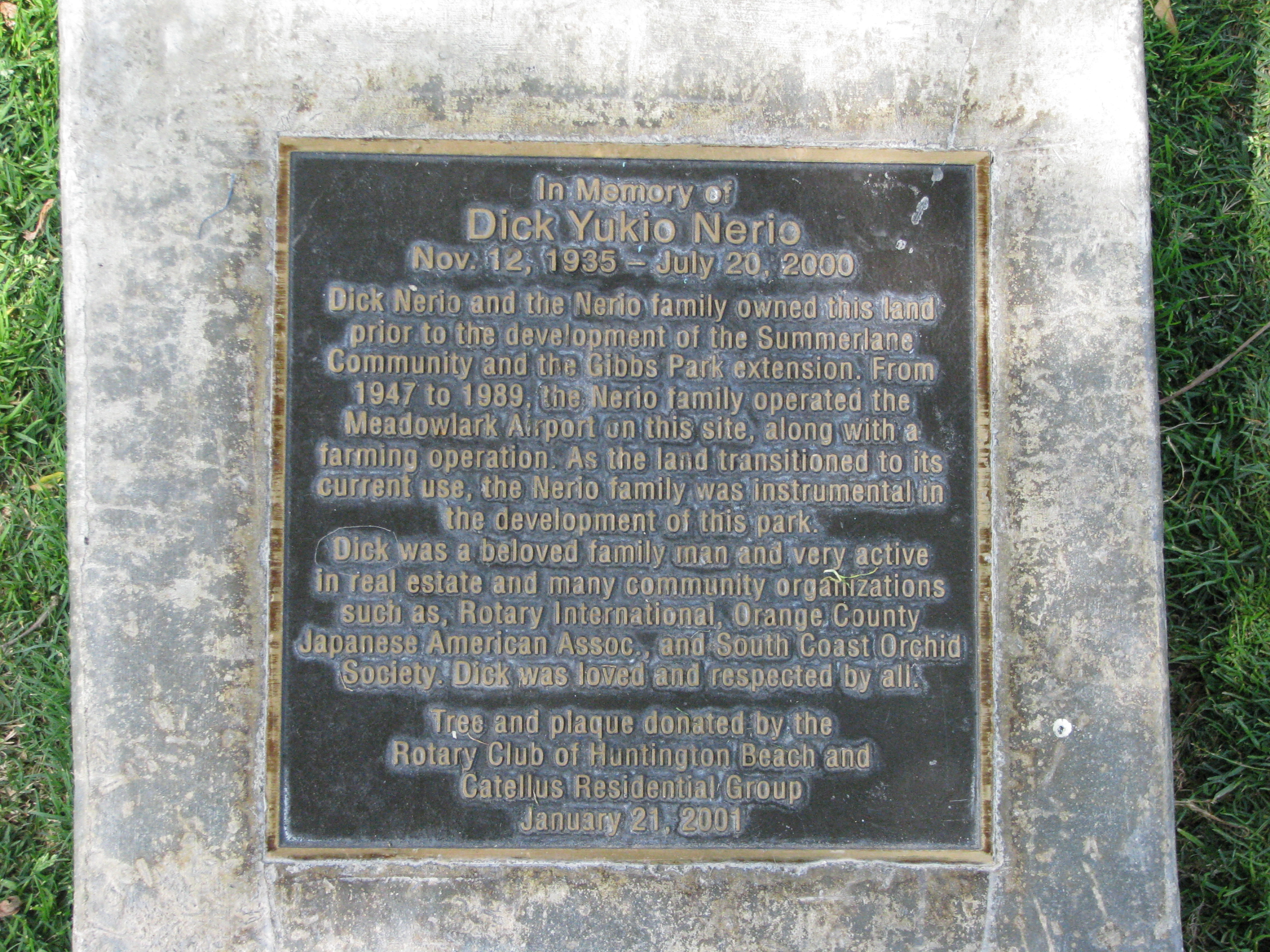
Plaque commemorating Nerio and Meadowlark Airport

Occupying the former airport site is the Summerlane community of single-family homes, within which is the Norma Brandell Gibbs Butterfly Park. It contains a plaque commemorating Dick Nerio and Meadowlark Airport.
