= Donut Derelicts =

Donut Derelicts is an informal weekly car show held in Huntington Beach, California, United States since approximately 1986. The event takes place in the parking lot on the north-east corner of the intersection of Magnolia Street and Adams Avenue on Saturday mornings between approximately 6:30 am and 8:30 am. The show is completely informal; it has no rules, no fee, no prizes, no formal competition, and no flyers. Nonetheless, several hundred cars show up each Saturday morning.

The gathering started with just a few friends showing up at a donut store every Saturday, and grew from there. One of the original participants, automotive artist Rick Finn, made a T-shirt design in 1989 that has become the logo of the event, and is sold (in many variations now) at the donut store which the event originally centered on.

The event has spawned a number of imitators in different cities.
