= Dave Sullivan (California politician) =

American politician

Dave Sullivan was mayor of Huntington Beach, California in 1996 and an orthodontist. His term on the city council expired in December 2006. Sullivan was reelected to the city council in 2012.
