= Huntington Beach City School District =

School district in California, United States

Address
- 8750 Dorsett Drive Huntington Beach, California, 92646; United States

District information
- Type: Public
- Grades: K–8
- NCES District ID: 0618030

Students and staff
- Students: 5,310 (2020–2021)
- Teachers: 221.02 (FTE)
- Staff: 226.69 (FTE)
- Student–teacher ratio: 24.02:1

Other information
- Website: www.hbcsd.us

Huntington Beach City School District is a public school district based in Orange County, California, United States.

== Schools ==
Middle schools:

- Ethel R. Dwyer Middle School
- Isaac L. Sowers Middle School

Elementary schools:

- John H. Eader Elementary School
- Dr. Ralph E. Hawes Elementary School
- Huntington Seacliff Elementary School
- S. A. Moffett Elementary School
- Joseph R. Perry Elementary School
- John R. Peterson Elementary School
- Agnes L. Smith Elementary School
