= Superior =

Superior may refer to:

- Superior (hierarchy), something which is higher in a hierarchical structure of any kind

== Places ==
- Superior (proposed U.S. state), an unsuccessful proposal for the Upper Peninsula of Michigan to form a separate state
- Lake Superior, the largest of the North American Great Lakes, Canada, United States and the second largest lake in the world.

=== United Kingdom ===
- Rickinghall Superior, England

=== United States ===
- Superior, Arizona
- Superior, Colorado
- Superior, Iowa
- Superior Township, Chippewa County, Michigan
- Superior Township, Washtenaw County, Michigan
- Superior, Montana
- Superior, Nebraska
- Superior, West Virginia
- Superior, Wisconsin, a city
- Superior (town), Wisconsin, a town adjacent to the city
- Superior (village), Wisconsin, a village adjacent to the city
- Superior, Wyoming
- Superior (RTA Rapid Transit station), a station on the RTA Red Line in Cleveland, Ohio
- Superior Bay, a bay between Minnesota and Wisconsin
- Superior Falls, a waterfall between Michigan and Wisconsin

== Religious titles ==
- An abbot or prior
- Superior general, a supervisory role in a religious order or congregation
- Provincial superior, a supervisory role in a religious order or congregations

== Entertainment ==
- Superior (band), a progressive metal band from Germany
- "Superior", a song by Nmixx from Heavy Serenade
- "Superior", a song by SpongeBob & The Hi-Seas from The Best Day Ever
- "Superior", a song by the Happy Fits from Lovesick
- Superior (album), a 2008 album by Tim Christensen
- Superior (manga), a 2009 Manga created by Ichtys
- Superior (comics), a creator-owned comic book series written by Mark Millar and illustrated by Leinil Francis Yu
- Superior (film), a 2021 drama film by Erin Vassilopoulos

== Biology ==
- Superior (anatomy), an anatomical term of relative location
- Superior potato, a potato variety
- Superior (gastropod), a genus of snails in the family Neritidae
- Superior, a description of the relative position of a flower's ovary

== Business ==
- Standard Superior, a German automobile brand built in the 1920s
- Superior (bus manufacturer), an Australian manufacturer of buses
- Superior Coach Company, a former manufacturer of school buses and that currently builds hearses
- Superior Helicopter, a heavy lift helicopter operator of Glendale, Oregon
- Superior Industries, a conveyor manufacturer based in Morris, Minnesota
- Superior Oil Company, defunct American oil company, now part of ExxonMobil
- Superior Software, a video game publisher
- Superior Airways, a chartered air service based in Red Lake, Ontario, Canada

== Other uses ==
- Superior: The Return of Race Science, a book (2019) by Angela Saini
- Roman Catholic Diocese of Superior, Wisconsin
- Superior multimineral process, a shale oil extraction technology developed by Superior Oil Company
- Superior (schooner), an 1816 schooner that operated on the Great Lakes
- Neil Superior (born 1963), American professional wrestler

== Superiority ==
Superiority may refer to:

- Air superiority, the dominance of one military's airborne forces over another in any given conflict
- Superiority complex, psychological condition
- "Superiority" (short story), a 1951 book by Arthur C. Clarke

== See also ==
- Mother Superior (disambiguation)
- Superior Aviation (disambiguation)
- Superior Bank (disambiguation)
- Superior High School (disambiguation)
- Superior Lake (disambiguation)
- Superior Township (disambiguation)
- Superia (disambiguation)
- Superior Township (disambiguation)
