= Robert Addison Day =

American businessman (1943–2023)

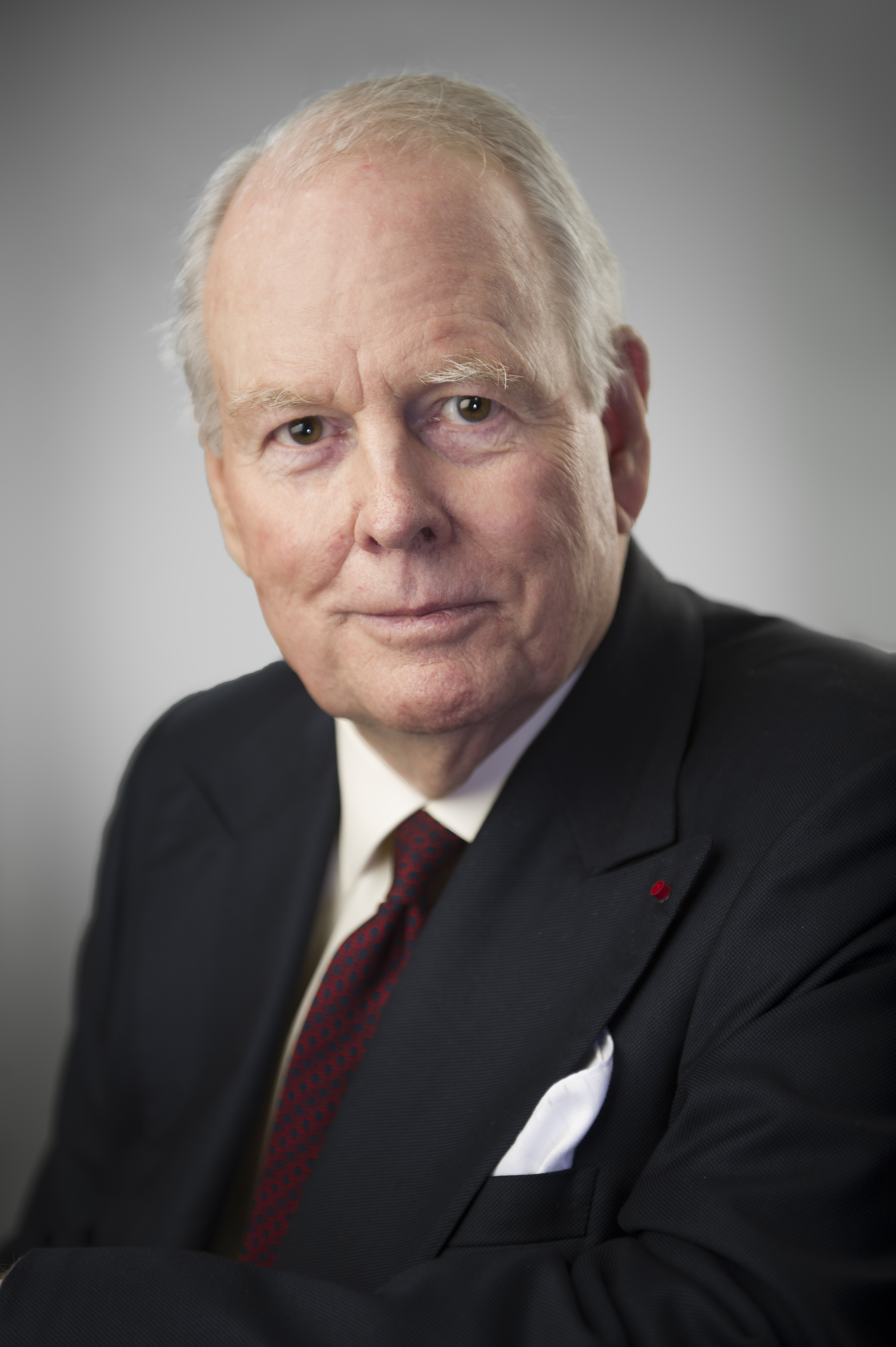
- Born: December 11, 1943; Los Angeles, California, U.S.
- Died: September 14, 2023 (aged 79); Los Angeles, California, U.S.
- Occupations: Businessman, investor, philanthropist
- Spouses: Marlyn Gates; Kelly Day (divorced) Marina Day (divorced)
- Children: 3
- Relatives: William Myron Keck (grandfather)

Robert Addison Day (December 11, 1943 – September 14, 2023) was an American businessman, investor, and philanthropist. He was the founder and former chairman and chief executive officer of Trust Company of the West until 2009. He was the chairman and president of the W. M. Keck Foundation.

== Early life ==
Robert Addison Day was born in Los Angeles, California, on December 11, 1943. He received a Bachelor of Science in economics from Claremont McKenna College in 1965.

== Financial career ==
Day started his career at the financial firm White, Weld and Company in New York City. In 1969, Day founded and managed the portfolio of the Cypress Partners LP, an early example of a hedge fund focusing on recognizing undervalued or overvalued companies. In 1971, he founded the Trust Company of the West (now known as the TCW Group), an asset management firm. In 2001, Day sold 70 percent of TCW Group to the Société Générale for US$2.5 billion, with 30 percent of the company remaining employee-owned.

Day was also the founder and chairman of Oakmont Corporation, a Los Angeles-based, family-owned investment company founded in 1980.

=== Other ventures ===
His family are the owners of Cabo Del Sol, an 1,800 acre master planned community located in Cabo San Lucas, Mexico. In 2021, Day and Oakmont Corporation announced plans for a new Four Seasons Resort and Residences on Cabo Del Sol, next to the Cove Club, a 500-acre private club and community located within Cabo Del Sol.

Day, as the controlling owner of the Foley Timber and Land Company, owned approximately 560,000 acres of timberland in Florida, making him one of the largest landowners in Florida at the time. Day's partners in the Foley Timber and Land Company included Howard H. Leach, Ken Langone and Henry Kissinger. The timberland was purchased in 1994 from Procter and Gamble, and when it was sold in 2015, it was considered to be the "largest undeveloped tract of private property east of the Mississippi River."

=== Board positions ===
Day has served on the corporate boards of Freeport-McMoRan, Fisher Scientific, and Société Générale. He has also sat on the board of trustees of the Center for the Study of the Presidency and Congress, the Ronald Reagan Presidential Foundation and Institute, and the Brookings Institution, where he was chairman from 1990 to 1998. Day was a member of the Business Council. From 2001 to 2003, he sat on the President's Intelligence Advisory Board. He was also a member of the Alfalfa Club, the California Club, the Center for Strategic and International Studies, and the Council on Foreign Relations. Day was a Los Angeles County Museum of Art life trustee.

== Philanthropy ==
Day was an active philanthropist throughout his life making major individual contributions and through the W. M. Keck Foundation which he chaired and served as CEO.

=== Claremont McKenna College ===
In 2007, Day made a gift of $200 million to his alma mater Claremont McKenna College, creating the Robert Day Scholars Program. The donation marked the largest recorded gift to a liberal arts college, the largest gift in the field of economics and finance, and among the top 20 gifts ever given to a college or university at the time.

=== W. M. Keck Foundation ===
Day was the chairman and former chief executive officer of the W. M. Keck Foundation, named after William Myron Keck. In 1997 under Day, the W.M. Keck Foundation funded a US$50 million grant for the Claremont Colleges, establishing a graduate-level, application-based scientific research and education program called the Keck Graduate Institute of Applied Life Sciences.

=== University of Southern California ===
In 1999, at Day's direction, the W. M. Keck Foundation made a gift of US$110 million to the University of Southern California in 1999, creating the Keck School of Medicine of USC. In 2011, the W.M. Keck Foundation made another contribution of US$150 million to USC. The university's academic medical enterprise was named Keck Medicine of USC, comprising Keck Medical Center of USC and the Keck School of Medicine. The Foundation gave another US$10 million to USC in 2017, renaming a building previously known as Healthcare Center 2 to Willametta Keck Day Healthcare Center. The Willametta Keck Day Healthcare Center contains multiple Keck Medicine of USC clinics, covering primary care and surgical specialties.

Nearly US$300 million has been donated to USC by the W.M. Keck Foundation and individual contributions, making the family amongst the university's top benefactors.

=== University of California Los Angeles ===
Also in 2007, Day and his then-wife donated US$30 million to the UCLA Department of Surgery through the UCLA Foundation, establishing the Robert and Kelly Day Surgical Endowment.

=== Martha's Vineyard Public Charter School ===
In September 2015, through the W.M. Keck Foundation, Day donated US$500,000 to the Martha's Vineyard Public Charter School, including US$400,000 for the purpose of creating a new science center named in honor of his close friend Vernon Jordan, a Civil Rights activist, lawyer, Democratic advisor, and longtime Martha's Vineyard summer visitor. The Jordan Science Center opened a year later.

== Personal life and death ==
Day was the grandson of Superior Oil Company founder William Myron Keck.

Robert Addison Day was married to Marlyn Gates. He had three children and lived in Los Angeles. He died in Los Angeles on September 14, 2023, at the age of 79.

=== Politics ===
Day has previously been a donor and economics advisor to the former Governor of California, Arnold Schwarzenegger. Since 1980, Day supported and hosted events for Congressman David Dreier. In October 2006, Day hosted a fundraiser with then-President George W. Bush, which raised US$1 million for the Republican Party. In 2015, Day donated $1.1 million to Super PACs supporting Republican presidential candidates Jeb Bush and Carly Fiorina.

== Recognition ==
In 2006, Day was awarded the Decoration of Officier de la Légion d'Honneur from the Government of France.

In recognition of Day, the Board of Trustees renamed the department of economics to Robert Day School of Economics and Finance at Claremont McKenna College in 2007.

In May 2014, the Caltech board of trustees awarded Day with the Robert A. Millikan Medal, its highest recognition, created to honor the life and ideals of the school's co-founder, Robert Andrews Millikan.

In December 2021, CMC announced the naming of the Robert Day Sciences Center as home to CMC's integrated sciences program.
