= Superior Township, Michigan =

Superior Township is the name of the following places in the U.S.:

- Superior Township, Chippewa County, Michigan
- Superior Township, Washtenaw County, Michigan

== See also ==
- Superior, Michigan
- Superior Township (disambiguation)
