= Lake Superior (disambiguation) =

Lake Superior is the largest of the North America Great Lakes.

Lake Superior may also refer to:

- Superior Lake (California), a dry lake basin
- Lake Superior State Park, in New York
- Lac-Supérieur, Quebec, a municipality
- Sudbury – White River train, formerly the Lake Superior
- Lake Superior and Mississippi Railroad

== See also ==
- Superior Lake (disambiguation)
