= Eran Chen =

American architect

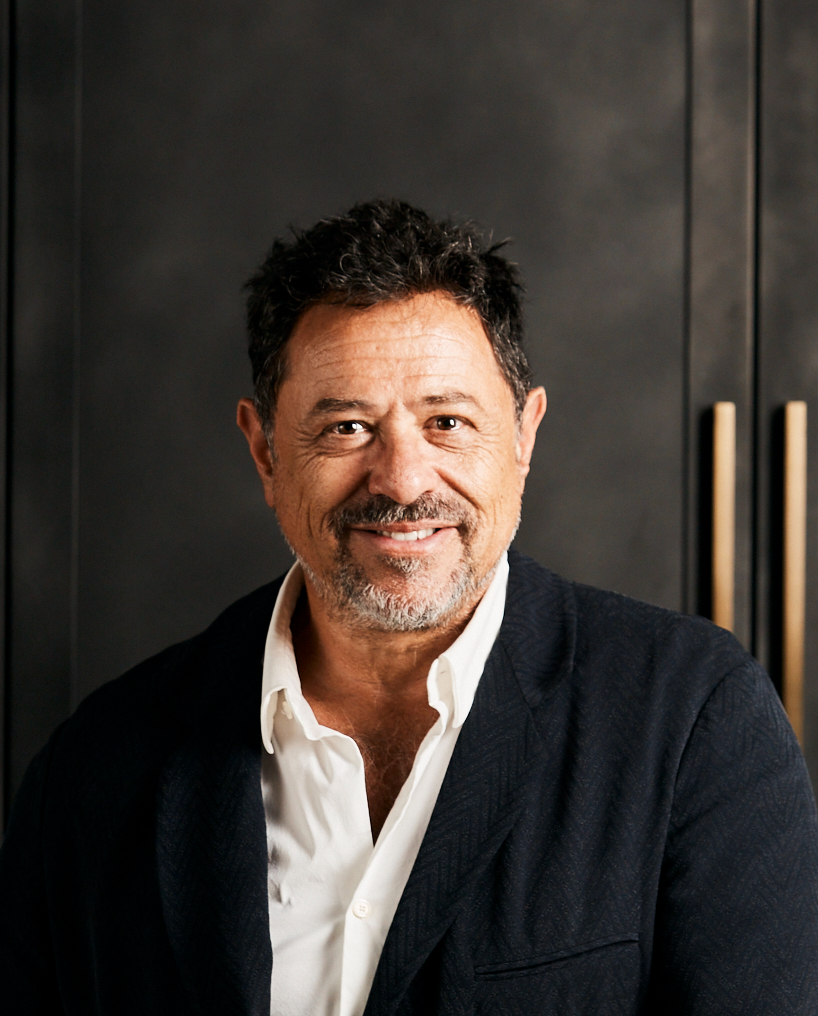
- Eran Chen in 2026
- Born: August 22, 1970; Be'er Sheva, Israel
- Occupation: Architect
- Practice: Perkins Eastman (1999-2007); Office of Architecture and Design (ODA) (2007-now)

Eran Chen AIA (born 22 August 1970 in Be'er Sheva, Israel) is an Israeli-American architect, founder and executive director of ODA (Office for Architecture and Design) since 2007. His firm has won large commissions worldwide (Post Rotterdam, Mazd in Moscow), but the bulk of his work is in New York (including large-scale designs Denizen and 420 Kent).

== Biography ==
Eran Chen grew up in Israel. His grandparents were Holocaust survivors. His father was an Air Force engineer. Chen did a 4-year service for the Israeli army (Special Forces unit), and then studied at the Bezalel Academy of Arts and Design in Jerusalem. While studying, he worked two years at David Guggenheim's architecture firm in Jerusalem. He was then hired by a local franchisee of McDonald's and designed 55 of its locations. He graduated in 1999 cum laude and moved to New York.

From 1999 to 2007, Chen worked for the architecture firm Perkins Eastman. He first joined the team working on the Beilinson Hospital in Israel, and then was assigned to competitions for new projects. In 2004, he was made a principal partner, and created a 30-employee studio within the firm.

He founded the architecture firm Office for Design and Architecture (ODA) in 2007. Early work included the renovation of 15 Union Square West, and the interior design of a Trump World Tower penthouse for financier Chinh Chu. He then won the commissions for Eliot Spitzer's 420 Kent and Larry Silverstein's Innovation QNS in Queens. In 2014, the firm won the competition for the large-scale housing development of Hunters Point in Long Island City. In 2024, his firm unveiled the design for 740 Eighth Avenue (The Torch) in New York, a skyscraper crowned with a spiraling ribbon.

== Work ==
Eran Chen's signature designs are facades of blocks making a solid foundation and elevating into a destructured block assemblage ("Jenga-style buildings"), often creating cascading balconies, interconnected courtyards, or oversize terraces. He conceives porous buildings with a vertical village approach, where the breathing spaces between the elements are seized to create new interactive opportunities. He cites Richard Meier, Moshe Safdie, Jacques Herzog and Norman Foster as some of his influences.

His work on historic buildings (Post Rotterdam, Book Tower, 10 Jay Street) is a mix of preservation and upbeat modernism.

== Select projects ==
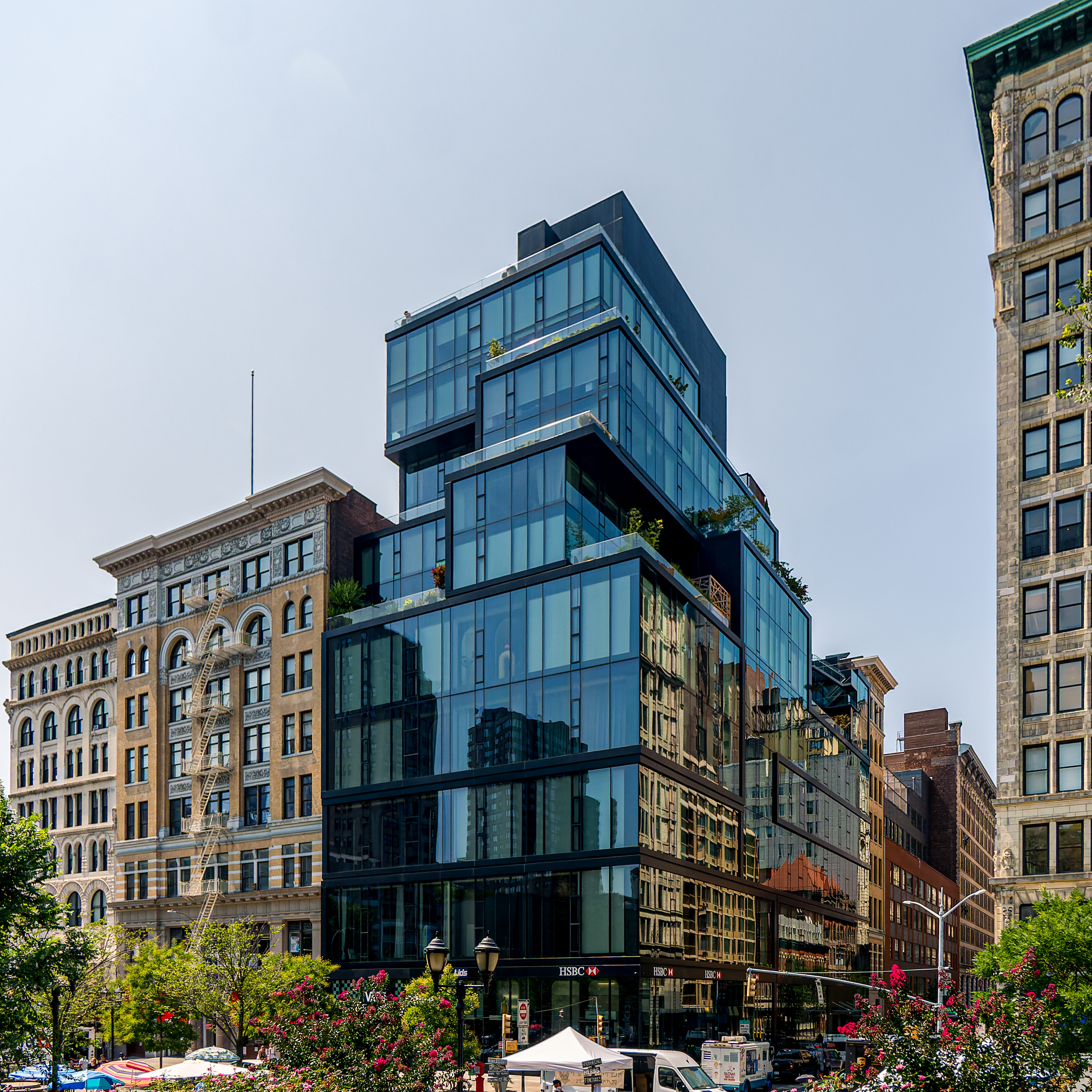
15 Union Square West.

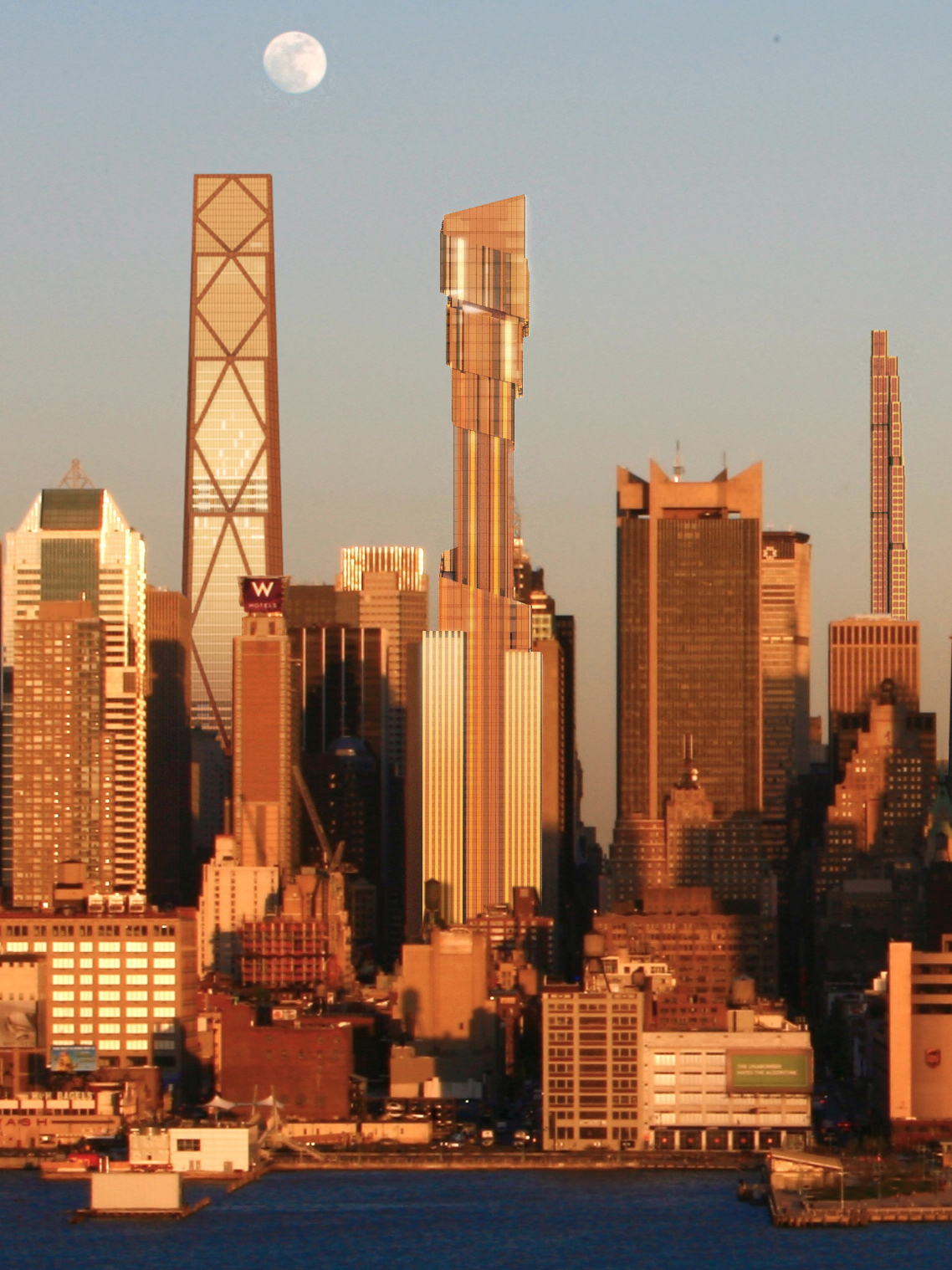
740 Eighth Avenue (The Torch).

=== Interior design ===
- Trump World Tower penthouse for financier Chinh Chu, New York, NY, USA
- Tribeca Loft, 39 Lispenard Street, New York, NY, USA

=== Buildings ===
- 15 Renwick, New York, NY, USA
- 251 First Street, Brooklyn, NY, USA (cascading balconies)
- 10 Jay Brooklyn, NY USA
- Hunters Point South, Long Island City, NY, USA
- 15 Union Square West (old Tiffany's location), New York, NY, USA
- 740 Eighth Avenue (The Torch), New York, NY, USA
- Post Rotterdam, Rotterdam, The Netherlands (mixed-use restoration of former Central Postkantoor)

=== Blocks and neighborhoods ===
- Denizen, 123 Melrose Street, Brooklyn, New York, USA (interconnected rooftop courtyards)
- 420 Kent, Brooklyn (most dwelling units are corner apartments), New York, NY, USA
- Book Tower, Detroit, USA (restoration of historic office building)
- Mazd, Moscow, Russia (mixed-use development of former industrial zone)

== Other roles ==
- Adjunct professor at Columbia University Graduate School of Architecture, Planning and Preservation
- Member of the Council on Vertical Urbanism
- Since 2024: Member of the Board of Trustees of the Center for Architecture

== Awards ==
- 2019: American Architecture Award (for 251 1st Street and 10 Jay Street)
- 2019: AIA Housing Design Awards (for The Rheingold)
- 2022: NYCxDESIGN Awards
- 2026: AIA NY Design Award (for Book Tower)

== Bibliography ==
- Unboxing New York. Actar. 2018. ISBN 978-1945150777.
- ODA: Office of Design and Architecture. Rizzoli. 2024. ISBN 978-0847899531.

== Private life ==
He is married and has three children.
