= Ten Thousand Miles along the Yellow River =

Chinese scroll painting

- 黃河萬里圖 (Chinese)
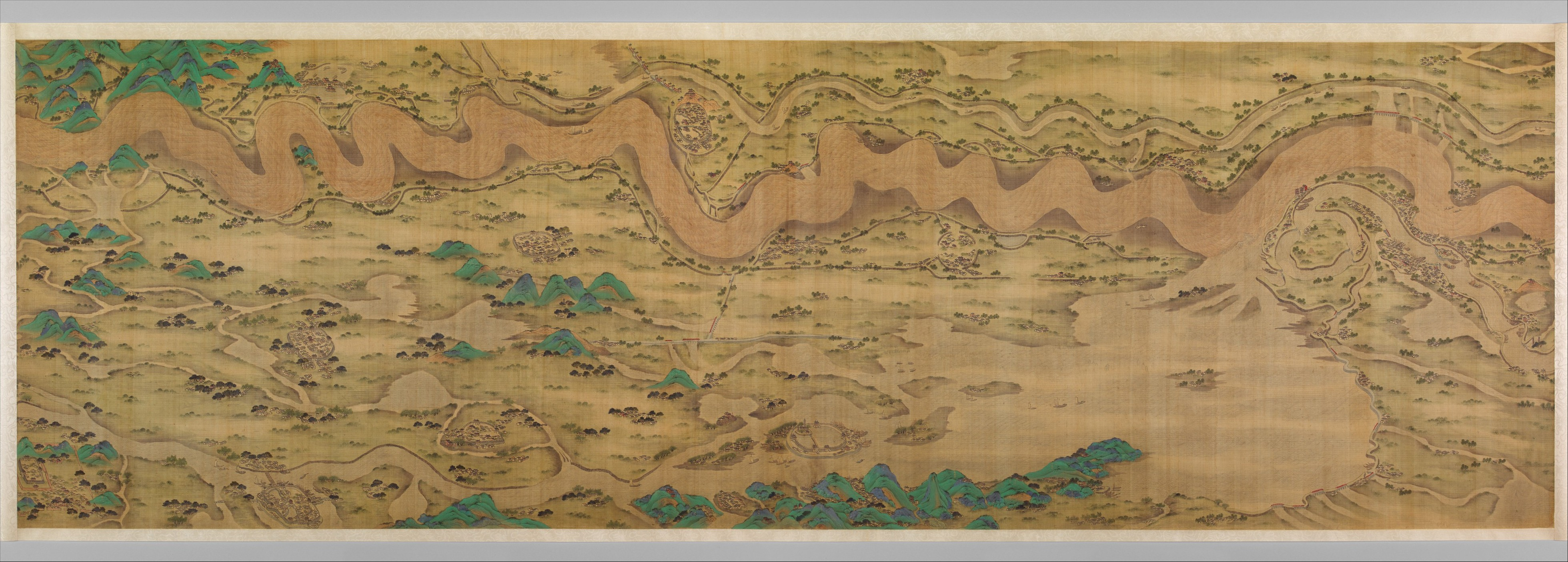
- Artist: Unidentified artist; Chinese, active late 17th–early 18th century
- Year: 1690–1722
- Type: Painting
- Medium: Ink, color, and gold on silk
- Subject: Yellow River
- Dimensions: 78 cm × 1285 cm (31 in × 506 in)
- Location: Metropolitan Museum of Art, New York City
- Accession: 2006.272a, b

Ten Thousand Miles along the Yellow River (Chinese: 黃河萬里圖) is a Chinese scroll painting by an unidentified artist. The painting is from the period of Qing dynasty and is thought to be created from 1690 to 1722. The painting illustrates the Yellow River System. Currently, the work is in the collection of the Metropolitan Museum, where the drawing was purchased in 2006 with the help of W. M. Keck Foundation, The Dillon Fund and other donors.

This was painted during the reign of Kangxi emperor (reign: 1662–1722).

Confucius described water as “twisting around ten thousand times but always going eastward, In China the symmetry of east and west is broken by tectonic forces". Here is an impact of geographical science.

== Gallery ==
Ten Thousand Miles along the Yellow River

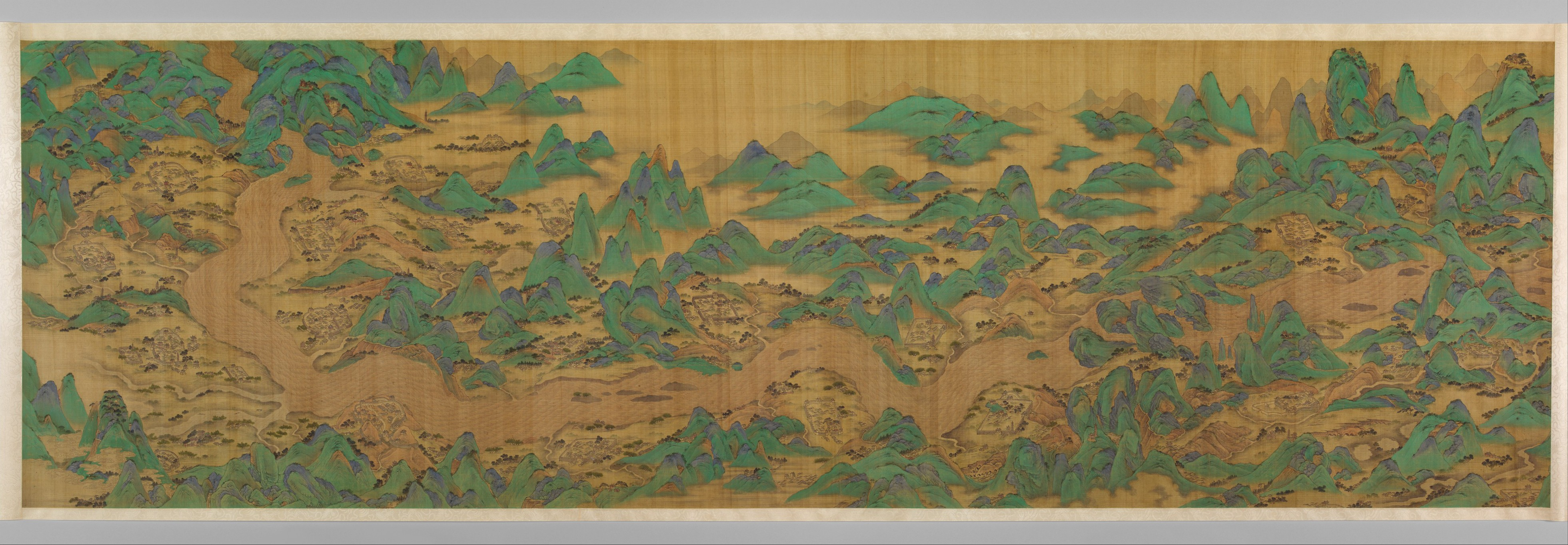
1

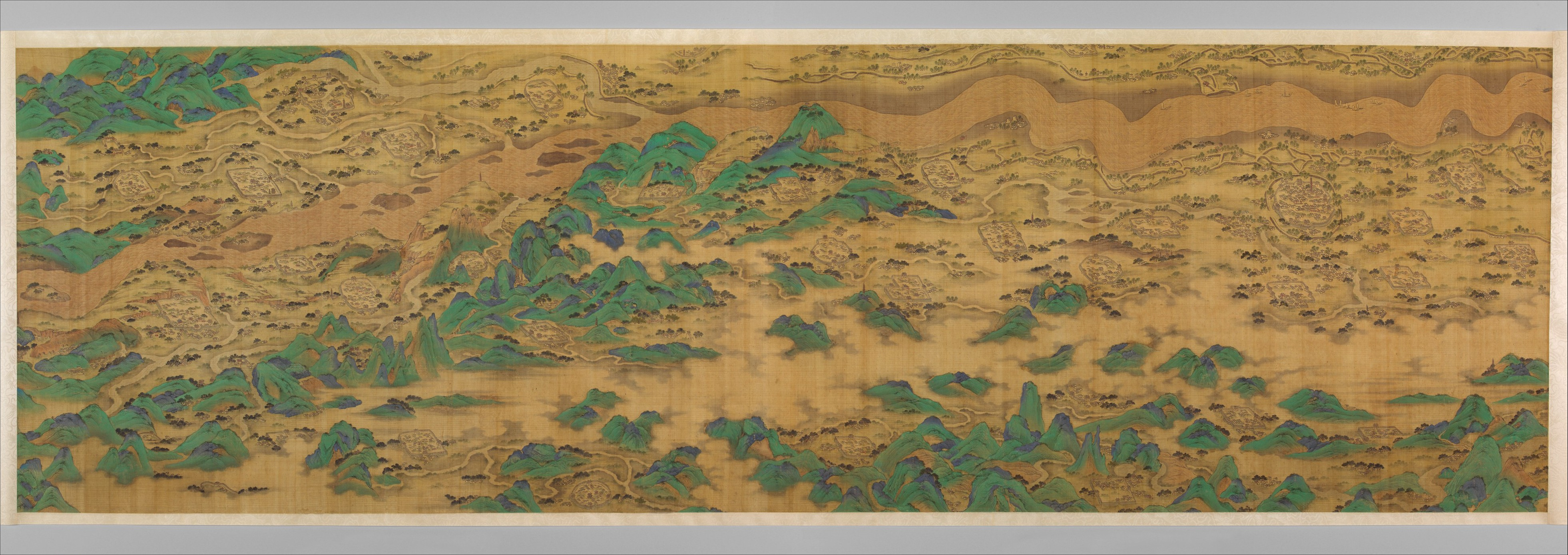
2

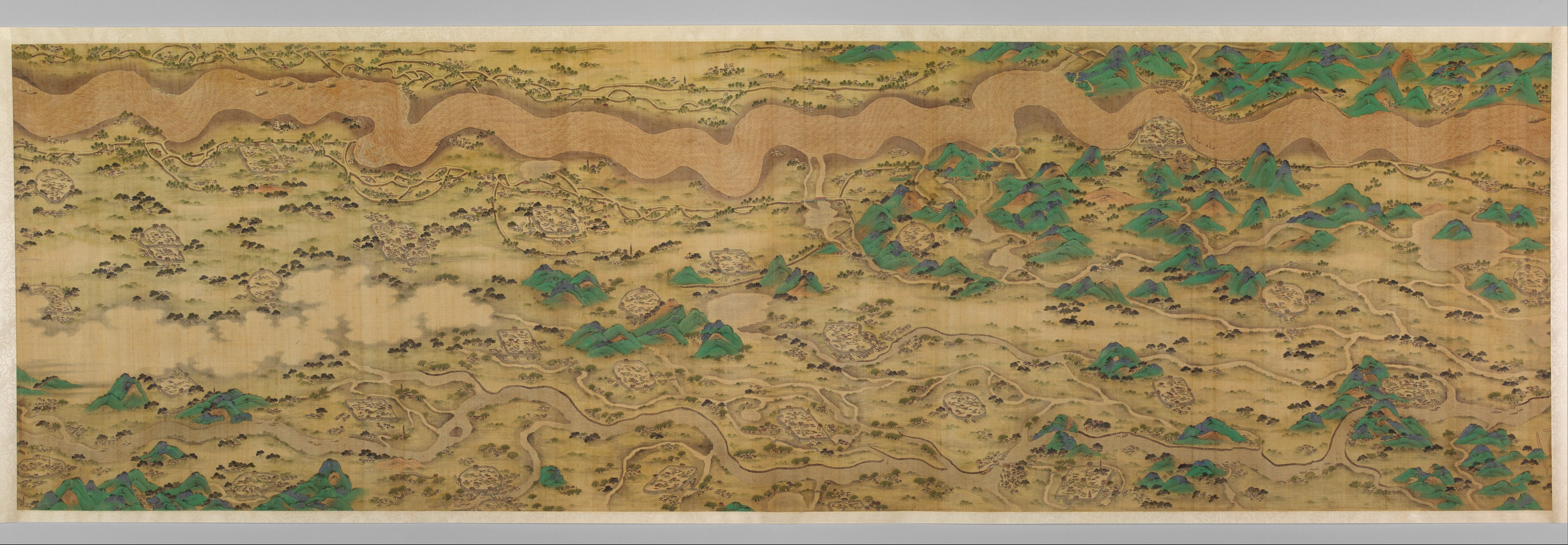
3

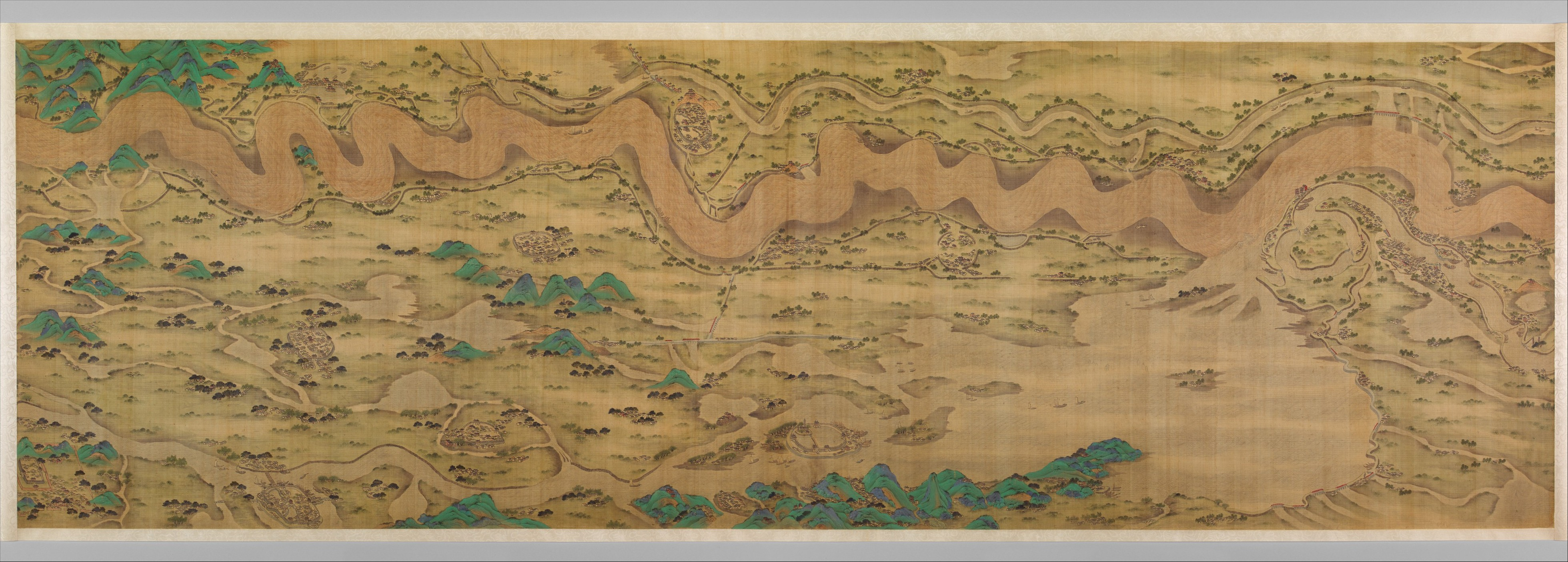
4

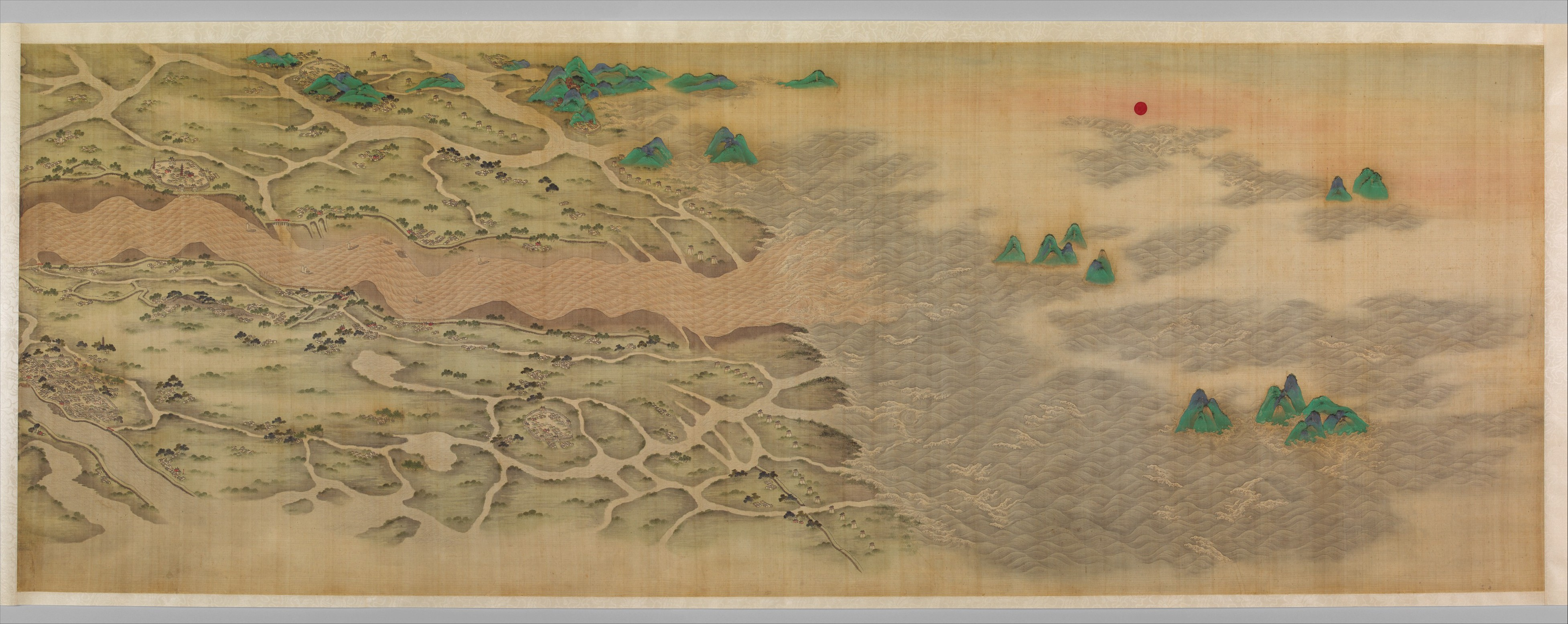
5
