= Standard Hotels =

American hotel chain

- Founded: 1999
- Founder: André Balazs
- Headquarters: New York City, United States
- Parent: Hyatt Hotels Corporation

The Standard Hotels is an international boutique hotel chain founded in 1999 and operated by Standard International Management. Its two original properties, in Hollywood and Los Angeles, closed in 2021 and 2022 respectively.

In October 2024, Hyatt Hotels completed the purchase of Standard International, the company responsible for managing The Standard and Bunkhouse Hotels.

== History ==
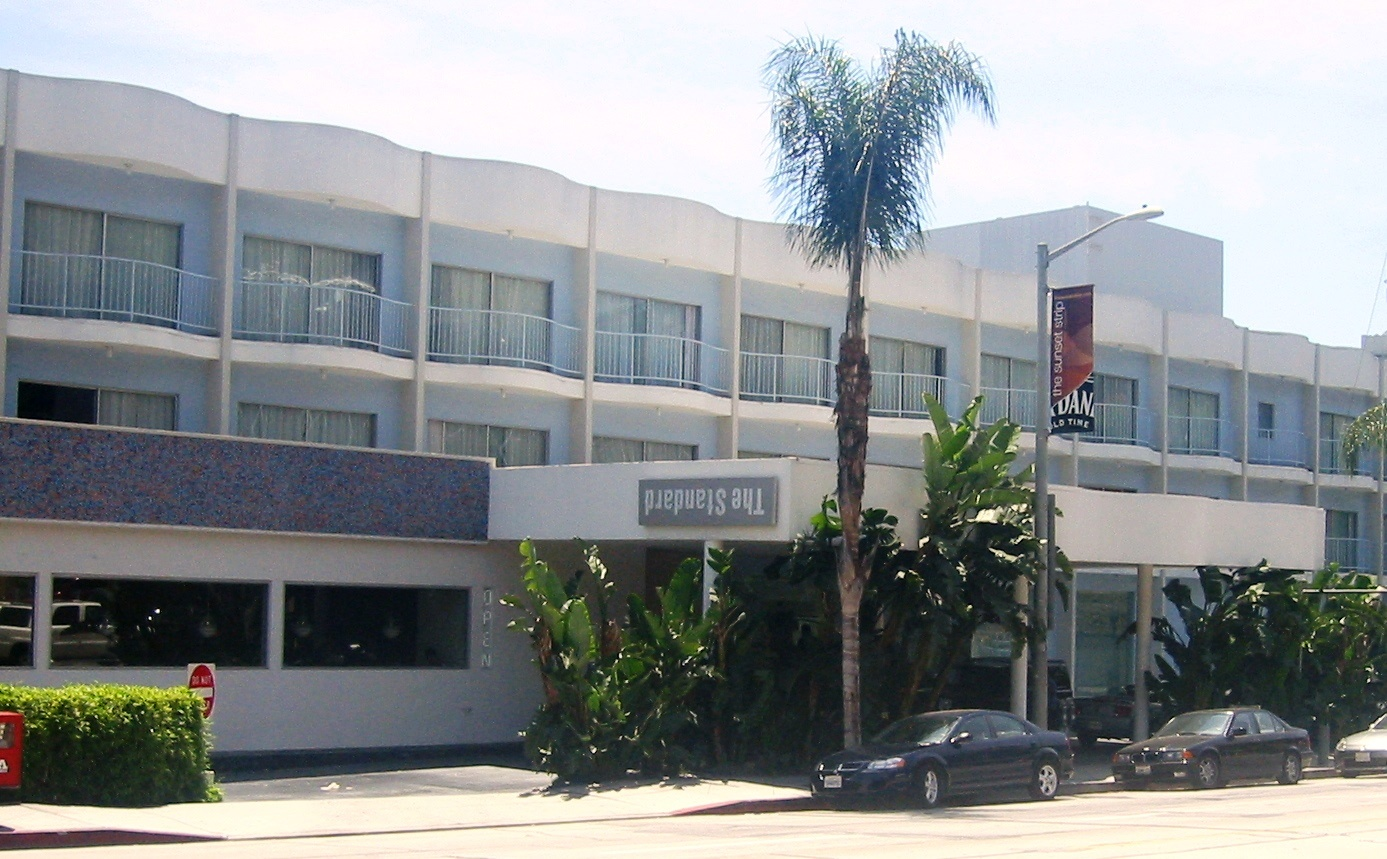
The original Standard on Sunset Boulevard, closed 2021

The first Standard Hotel, The Standard, Hollywood, opened on the Sunset Strip in 1999 in West Hollywood, California. It was developed by Andre Balazs Properties. The structure was originally built in 1962 as the Thunderbird Motel, and had become a retirement home when Balazs purchased and remodeled it. Original investors in the Hollywood hotel were Leonardo DiCaprio, Cameron Diaz, Benicio del Toro, D'arcy Wretzky and James Iha.

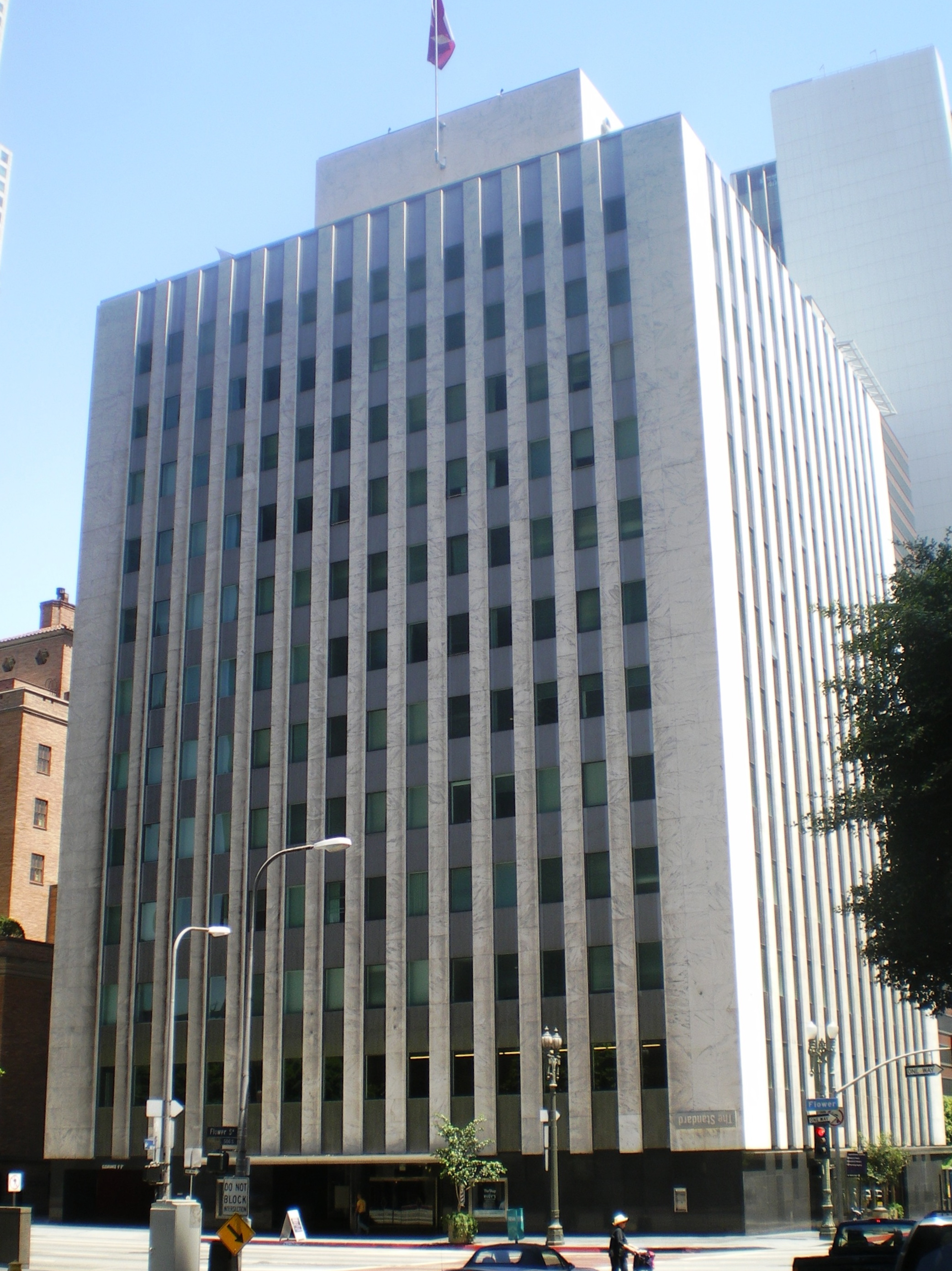
The Standard in Downtown Los Angeles (now The Delphi hotel), closed in 2020, reopened in 2023

In 2002, the former headquarters of the Superior Oil Company (completed in 1956) a twelve-story, marble-clad building was converted into The Standard, Downtown LA in 2002. The renovation was designed by Koning Eizenberg Architecture, Inc., and included the addition of a rooftop pool and bar, and a two-story lobby space reconfigured from the old banking hall. In 2003, the building was added to the National Register of Historic Places. The building was rebranded as The Delphi Hotel in 2023.

In 2006, The Standard Hotels expanded to Miami Beach, where they opened The Standard Spa, Miami Beach. Located on Biscayne Bay, The Standard Spa, Miami Beach, is a holistic and hydrotherapy-oriented spa hotel.

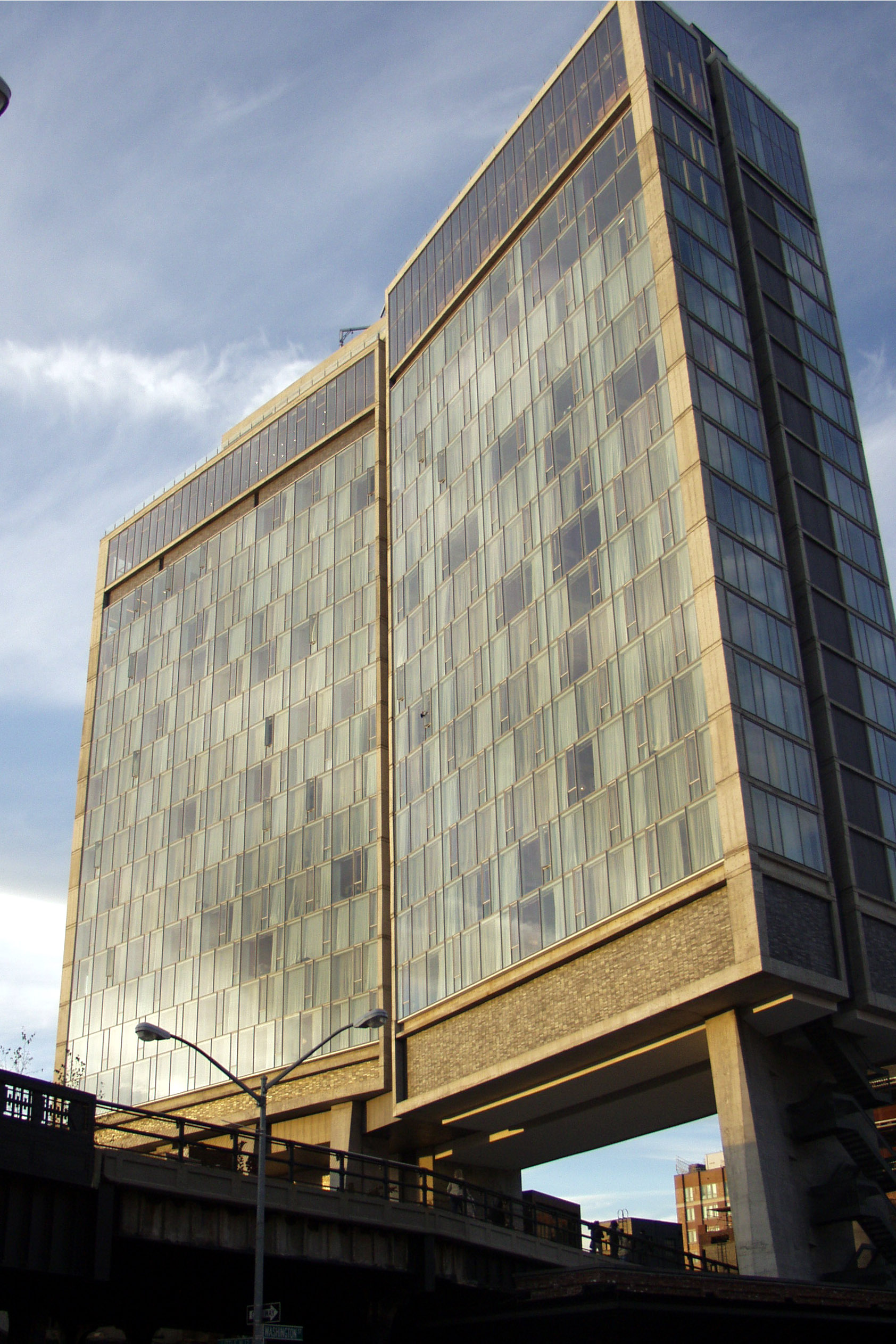
The Standard, High Line in Manhattan

In 2008, The Standard Hotels brand opened The Standard, High Line hotel. It was the first time the brand built a property from the ground up, rather than renovating an older space. The design was the work of the Ennead Architects.

In 2011, Andre Balazs Properties completed the acquisition of The Cooper Square Hotel. The building was gutted and transformed into The Standard, East Village.

In the Fall of 2013, the brand's founder, Andre Balazs, sold an 80% stake in the company to Standard International.

In July 2019, The Standard, London opened in Kings Cross. The property was The Standard's first hotel located outside the United States.

On November 1, 2019, The Standard, Maldives opened in Huruvalhi, Raa Atoll.

The Standard Hollywood, which closed temporarily in 2020 due to the COVID-19 pandemic, closed permanently on January 22, 2021, due to a 2019 increase in the lease price on the hotel and the economic impact of the COVID-19 pandemic.

The Standard Downtown LA, which also closed temporarily in 2020 due to the COVID-19 pandemic, never reopened, was closed permanently on January 22, 2022.

The Standard, Hua Hin opened in December 2021 in Hua Hin, Thailand. In April 2022, The Standard, Ibiza opened in Dalt Vila, Ibiza. The Standard, Bangkok Mahanakhon opened in July 2022 in the King Power Mahanakhon tower, becoming the brand's Asia flagship with design by Jaime Hayon.

On August 8, 2024, The StandardX, Melbourne opened in Fitzroy, Victoria. The new brand was announced as a "rebellious younger sibling" to the existing portfolio of Standard hotels.

On August 20, 2024, Hyatt Hotels Corporation announced its plans to acquire Standard International and the brands within its portfolio, including The Standard, The StandardX, The Peri, Bunkhouse Hotels and The Manner. Hyatt plans to integrate all current and pipeline hotels into its World of Hyatt loyalty program by the end of 2024, as well as establish a new lifestyle hotels division out of New York City that will be led by a combination of Standard and Hyatt executives to oversee the development of its lifestyle hotel brands.

In October 2024, it was reported that Hyatt had completed the acquisition of the brand's parent company.

== Locations ==
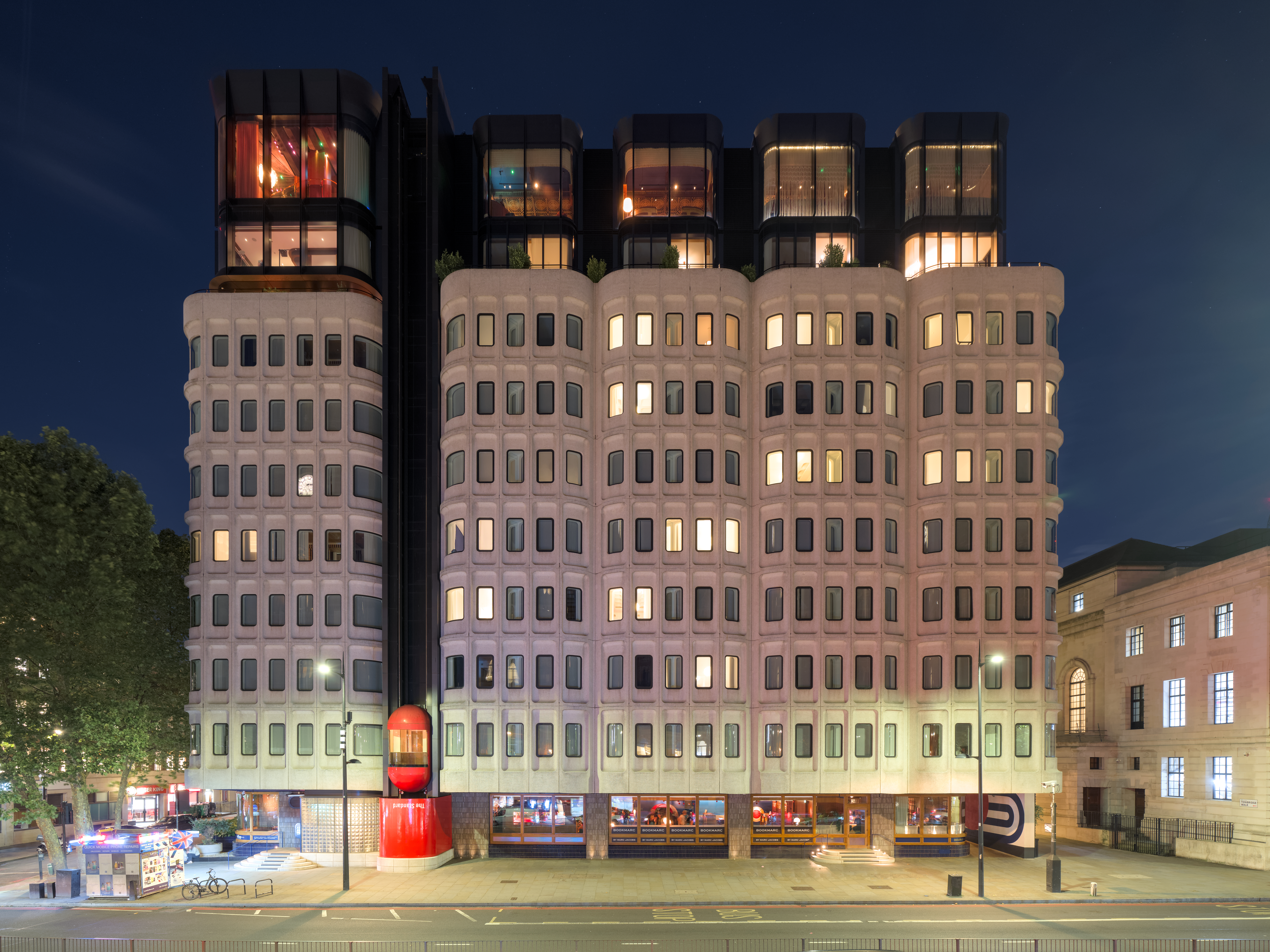
The Standard, London

- The Standard Spa, Miami Beach (Miami Beach, Florida) – 2006
- The Standard, High Line (New York City) – 2008
- The Standard, East Village (New York City), formerly the Cooper Square Hotel – 2011
- The Standard, London – 2019
- The Standard, Maldives – 2019
- The Standard, Hua Hin – 2021
- The Standard, Ibiza – 2022
- The Standard, Bangkok Mahanakhon – 2022
- The StandardX, Melbourne – 2024
- The Standard, Singapore – 2024
- The Standard, Brussels – 2025
- The Standard, Pattaya Na Jomtien - 2025

== Future Locations ==
- The Standard, Lisbon - 2027
- The Standard, Mexico City - 2027
- The Standard, Austin - 2027
- The StandardX Times Square - 2028

== Former locations ==
- The Standard Hollywood in West Hollywood – 1999–2021
- The Standard, Downtown LA, formerly the Superior Oil Company Building – 2002–2022
- The StandardX, Bangkok Phra Arthit – 2024-2026
