= The Delphi Hotel =

- U.S. National Register of Historic Places
- Los Angeles Historic-Cultural Monument
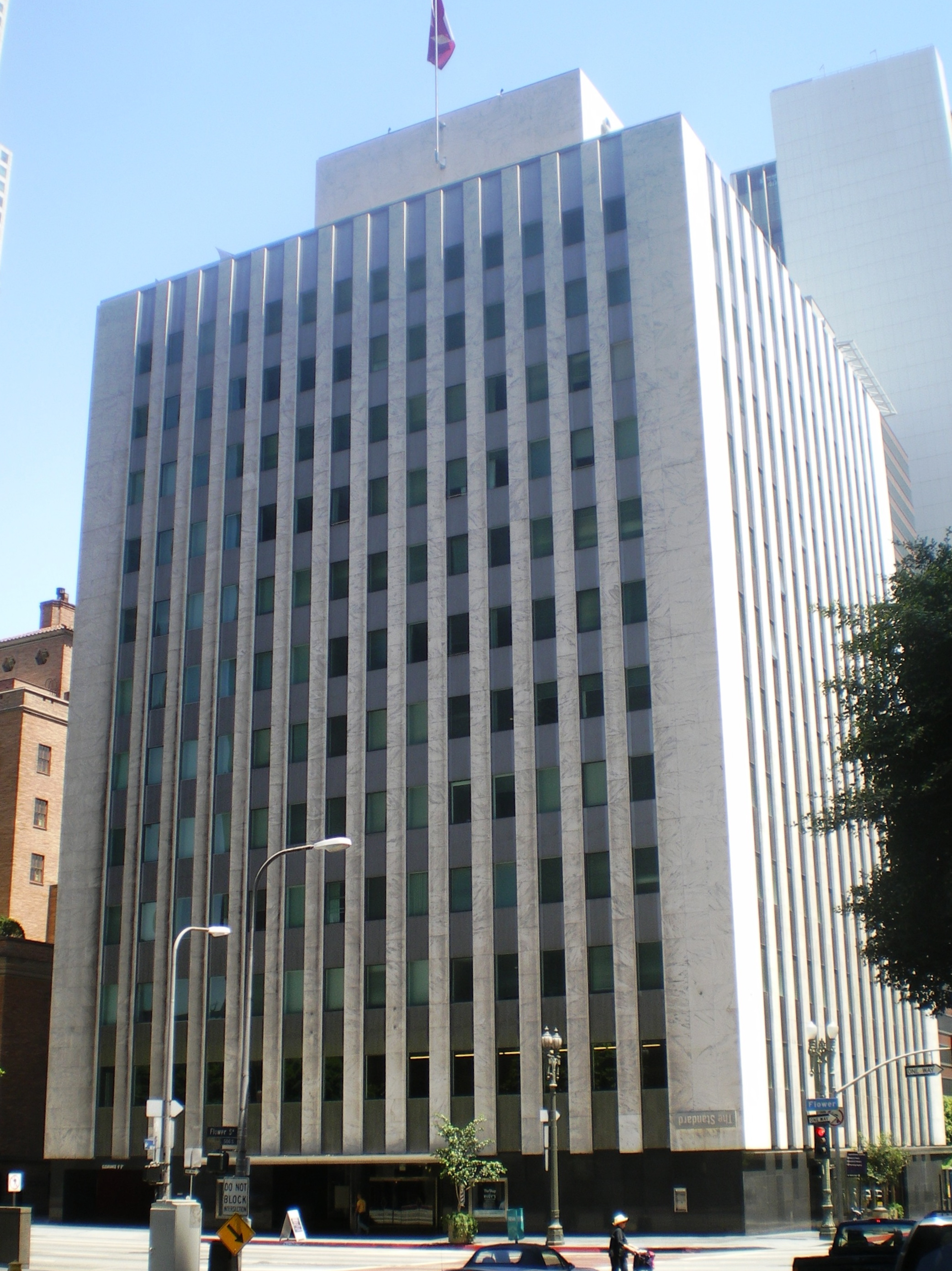
- The former Superior Oil Company Building, 2008

- Location within the Los Angeles metropolitan area Location within California Location within the United States
- Location: 550 S. Flower St., Los Angeles, California
- Coordinates: 34°3′1″N 118°15′22″W
- Built: 1955–1956
- Architect: Beelman, Claud; Simpson, William
- Architectural style: Modern
- NRHP reference No.: 03000059
- LAHCM No.: 686
- Added to NRHP: February 28, 2003

The Delphi Hotel is a 12-story hotel located at 550 S Flower St in Downtown Los Angeles in the marble-clad high-rise Superior Oil Company Building formerly the headquarters of the now defunct company, converted to The Standard Downtown LA hotel in 2002, then closed in 2020 and reopened in 2023 under its current name.

== History ==
=== Office building ===
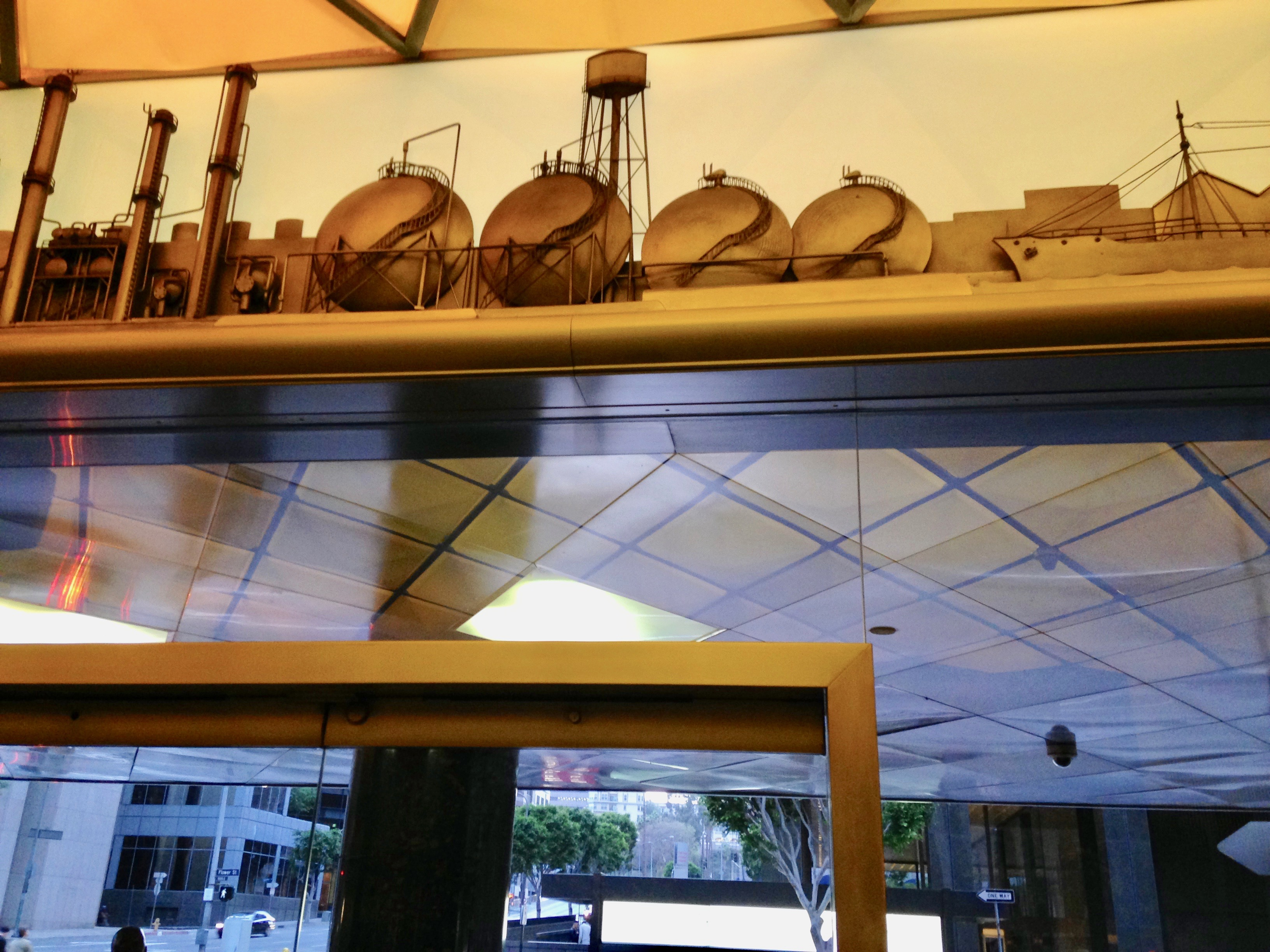
A bas-relief-style metal sculpture of an oilfield and refinery landscape above the Flower Street entrance interior.

The marble-clad Superior Oil Company Building was constructed from 1955 to 1956 as an office building by the Keck family to serve as the headquarters for the Superior Oil Company. Designed by Claud Beelman in the Late Moderne style, the 12-story structure was built by The William Simpson Construction Company. The tower's design has been described as showing "how the oft-overlooked Beelman advanced the type and style of mid-century office buildings." It was given distinctive marble, granite, and stainless-steel surfaces. The building's design featured motifs particular to Superior Oil, including stylized "S" door pulls for the entrances and a bas-relief-style metal sculpture of an oilfield and refinery landscape above the Flower Street entrance interior. According to the Los Angeles Times, it became "one of the area's most significant examples of the postwar modernism style popular in corporate architecture during the 1950s."

The LA Conservancy calls the building "one of the finest examples of the Corporate Moderne style in Los Angeles and stands out as one of the strongest designs of architect Claud Beelman’s later career." The architecture represents a "simplified, abstracted redefinition" of Beelman's earlier explorations in the Late Moderne styles, also incorporating Modernist principles to "create a refined new corporate idiom." The building uses steel framing and a "pier and spandrel system" similar to those pioneered by Louis Sullivan. In a twist, however, the piers are clad in white marble and the recessed spandrels are ribbed stainless steel between window spaces, emphasizing the vertical nature of the architecture.

In 1963, the building became the southern California headquarters of the Bank of California, and for a time the building was called the Bank of California Building. The building was vacated in 1992, after the Bank of California was merged into Union Bank of California.

=== Downtown Standard Hotel ===
By 2000, local preservation groups were expressing worries that the vacant structure would be gutted and used as a telecommunications switching station, like other office buildings in the area. In January 2000, it was reported that the Union Bank of California had sold the building to William Gustafson and Mark Neumann's Columbia Development, "a Manhattan Beach-based hotel investment and development firm," for an undisclosed sum. With backing from local preservation groups, it was to be the "central city's first major new hotel in nearly a decade."

Columbia Development Group, in partnership with Bear Stearns, JPMorgan Partners and Standard Holdings, converted the office building into a hotel operated by The Standard Hotels chain, run by Andre Balazs, which had opened its first boutique hotel in Hollywood in 1999. The conversion was designed by Koning Eizenberg Architecture, Inc. and was constructed by Sam Martel of Taisei Construction. Christy McAvoy of Historical Resources Group was the historic preservation consultant.

The Standard Downtown LA opened in May 2002 as a 207-room boutique hotel, with a rooftop pool and bar with space for DJs and pool parties, a beer garden, a ping pong club, a 24-hour coffee shop and a lobby lounge. In 2011, Los Angeles Weekly included the building's rooftop restaurant as number 5 on its "Top 10 Restaurants in Buildings Designed by Significant Los Angeles Architects" list. The pool on the roof has three "water-bed cabanas housed in plastic pods that resemble something out of a 1960s sci-fi movie."

In 2003, the building was added to the National Register of Historic Places based on its architecture, particularly its moderne style and engineering. Also in 2003, The Standard Hotel Downtown was awarded the Los Angeles Conservancy's preservation award, for "bringing a youthful buzz to a 1955 modernist skyscraper on Flower Street downtown."

In 2009, the operator of the Standard Hotel was charged with dumping pool chemicals into the street below in a violation of federal environmental laws. Standard Hotel pled guilty for the incident in 2010. A shooting resulted in a death outside the hotel lobby in 2015. In 2016, an injured bystander to the shootout sued the hotel, alleging insufficient security. In May 2017, the food festival Smorgasburg LA debuted a popup residency at the Standard Hotel.

The hotel closed temporarily in early 2020, due to the COVID-19 pandemic. In December 2021, it was announced that the closure would be permanent as of January 22, 2022.

=== Delphi Hotel ===
The hotel reopened on April 1, 2023 as the Delphi Hotel.

== In popular culture ==
- The building entrance and exterior served as the fictional Brent Building in the television series Perry Mason (1957–1966), in which Mason's office was located in Suite 904.
- In the 1987 film RoboCop, the building can be seen in the 6000 SUX car commercial.
- Significant portions of the 2005 film Kiss Kiss Bang Bang were filmed outside the hotel and in the hotel's lobby, guest rooms, coffee shop, and rooftop bar/pool.
- The building was featured in the 2010 film Get Him to the Greek.
- In the 2015 film San Andreas, the building collapsed during an earthquake.
- The building was featured in the 2018 film Under the Silver Lake.
- The building was also briefly featured in Michael Mann's Collateral, in which Jamie Foxx's character Max grabs someone's cellphone outside.

== See also ==
- List of Registered Historic Places in Los Angeles
