= Howard Keck =

American businessman and racing enthusiast

Howard B. Keck
- Born: Howard Brighton Keck; September 20, 1913; Trinidad, California, U.S.
- Died: December 14, 1996 (aged 83); Santa Monica, California
- Occupations: Businessman: Oil exploration/production Racehorse owner/breeder Philanthropist
- Spouse: Elizabeth A. Keck

Howard Brighton Keck (September 20, 1913 – December 14, 1996) was an American businessman. He was also a Thoroughbred racehorse owner and breeder, and the owner of an auto racing team that twice won the Indianapolis 500.

== Early life ==
Born in Trinidad, California, he was the second of the six children of William Myron Keck, the founder of the Superior Oil Company of California.

== Career ==
On his father's death in 1964, Howard Keck took the helm of the oil company. He made substantial investments in exploration for new resources and in the company's production systems that made it the largest independent oil producing company in North America. In March 1984, Superior Oil was sold to Mobil Corporation (part of ExxonMobil since 1999) for $5.7 billion.

== Philanthropy ==
He was also head of the W. M. Keck Foundation set up by his father. The philanthropic foundation has provided substantial funding for numerous science and technology institutions and projects including the Keck Center for International and Strategic Studies at Claremont McKenna College in Claremont, California, the Keck School of Medicine of USC, the W. M. Keck Earth Science and Mineral Engineering Museum at the University of Nevada, Reno, Howard Keck Hall (Chemistry Building) at Rice University, and the Keck Distinguished Young Scholar Awards program. In 1985, Keck gave $70 million to the California Institute of Technology to fund the design and construction of the Keck I Telescope on the summit of Hawaii's dormant Mauna Kea volcano. Under Howard Keck, the Foundation grew from $250 million to more than $1.2 billion and as one of the leading grant-giving organizations in the United States has given away in excess of a billion dollars.

== Sporting activities ==
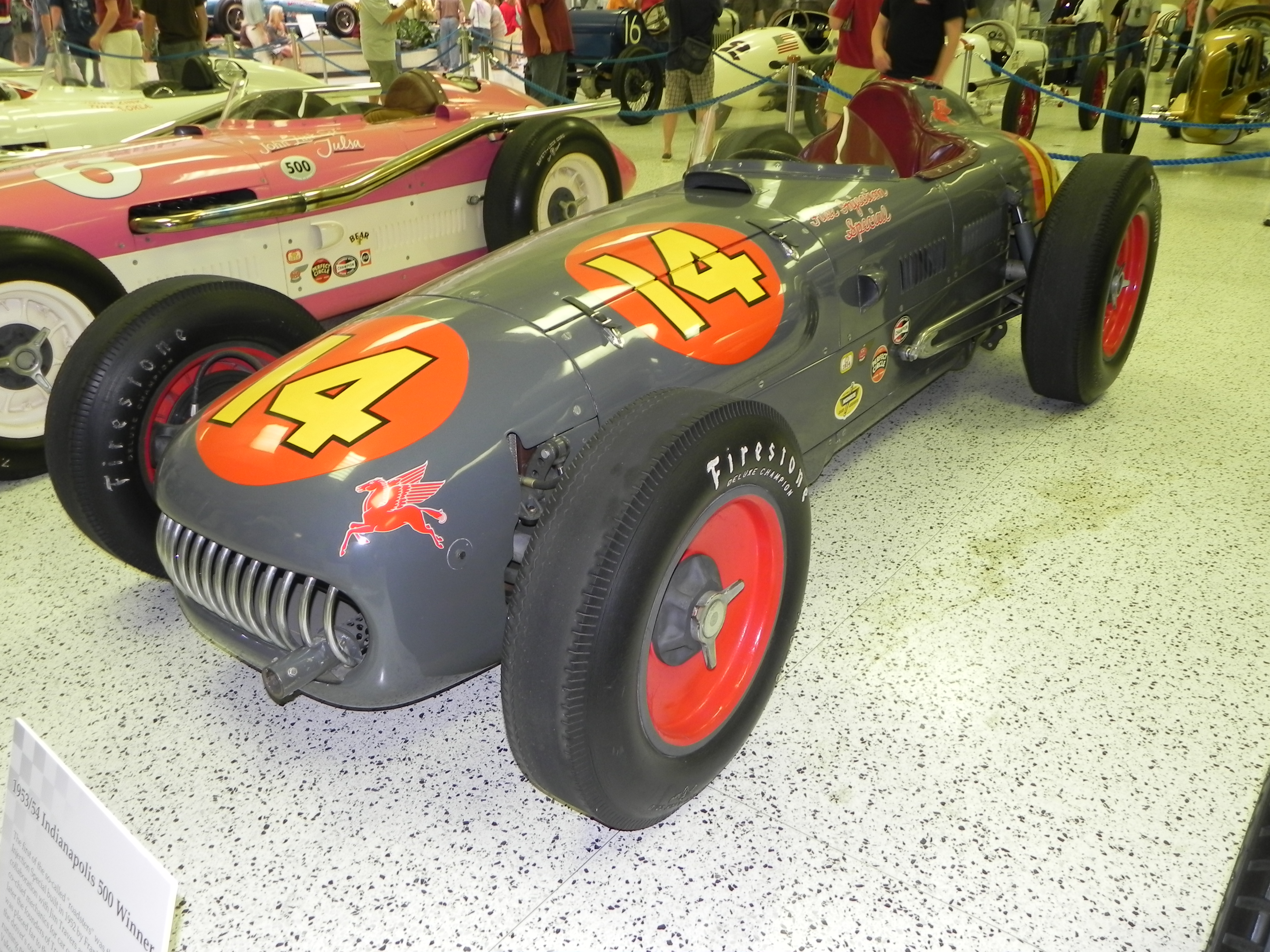
Vukovich's winning car from the 1953 and 1954 Indianapolis 500s

Keck's Indy car team, fronted by driver Bill Vukovich, won the Indianapolis 500 in 1953 and 1954.

Keck and his wife Elizabeth were prominent figures in the American Thoroughbred horse racing industry. Keck owned and bred American Horse of the Year Ferdinand, who won the 1986 Kentucky Derby and the 1987 Breeders' Cup Classic.

== Personal life ==
He resided in a mansion later owned by Ted Field located at 1244 Moraga Drive in the gated community of Moraga Estates in Bel Air, California. He originally owned the land that would become Moraga Estates, and he sold it to a developer in the 1970s, when it was turned into a forty-residence gated community in Bel Air. He sold the house to Jeffrey and Mary Swabe in 1979. A resident of Los Angeles, he died in 1996 at the age of eighty-three at St. John's Hospital and Health Center in Santa Monica.

== Honors ==
Minor planet 5811 Keck is named in his honor. The naming was given on the dedication of the second Keck Telescope on May 8, 1996.
