= 740 Eighth Avenue =

Planned skyscraper in Manhattan, New York

The StandardX Times Square The Torch
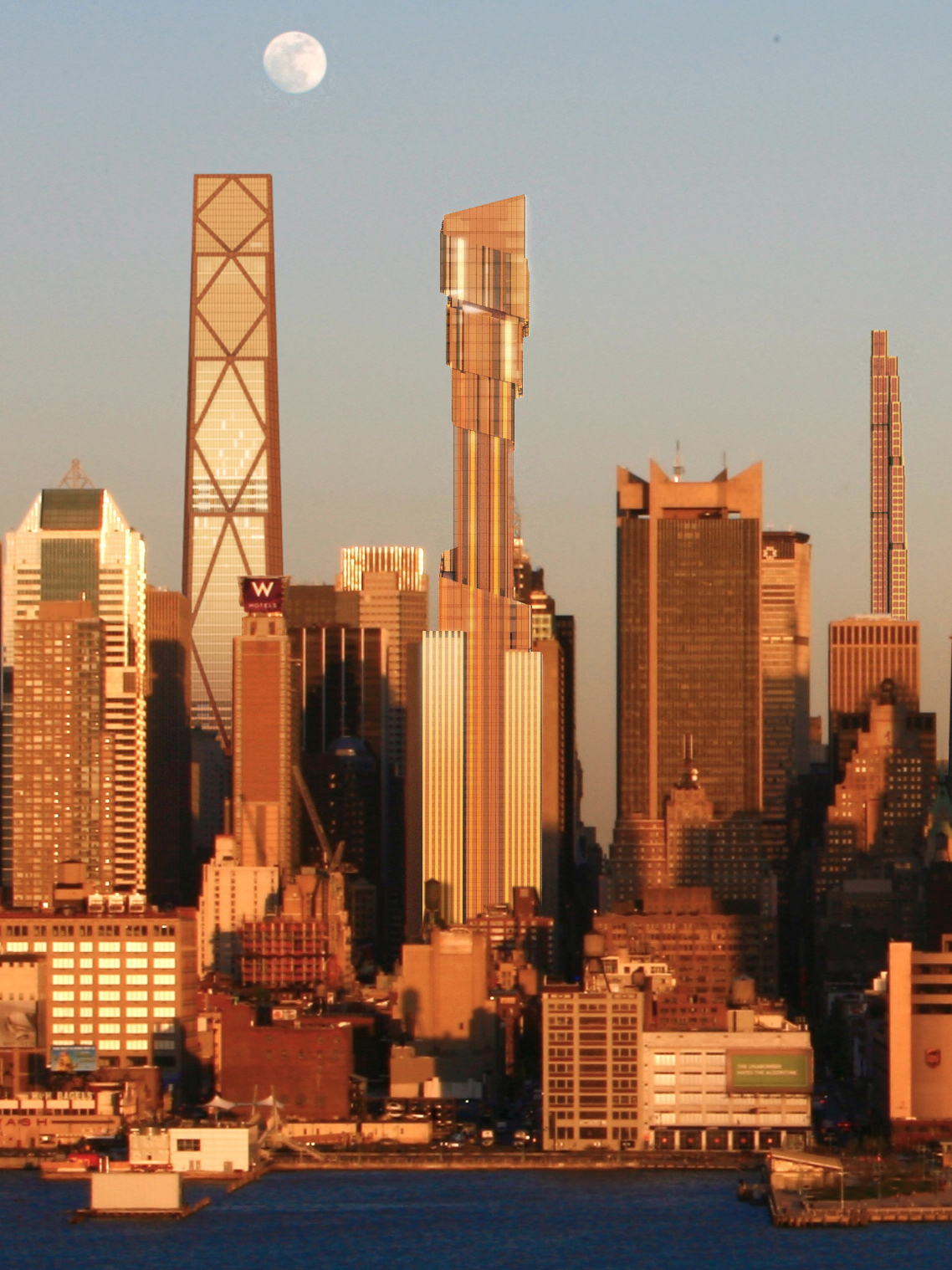
- Artist's impression

General information
- Status: Under construction
- Type: Hotel
- Location: 255 West 45th Street, New York, NY 10036, U.S.
- Coordinates: 40°45′34″N 73°59′16″W
- Construction started: 2022; 4 years ago
- Estimated completion: 2028; 2 years' time

Height
- Height: 1,067 feet (325 m)

Technical details
- Floor count: 52

Design and construction
- Architect: ODA Architecture
- Developer: Extell Development Company

Other information
- Number of rooms: 1,800

The StandardX Times Square (previously known as 740 Eighth Avenue and The Torch) is a supertall 1,800-room hotel skyscraper under construction in Midtown Manhattan, New York City, designed by Eran Chen's firm ODA Architecture. It is planned to reach a height of 1,067 feet (325 meters) and is scheduled for completion in 2028.

== Design and features ==
The 52-story, 1,067 ft (325 m) building will incorporate a 260-foot drop tower and a 360 degree observation deck. The Torch's design, featuring a 500-foot spiraling glass structure at the top, is inspired by the Statue of Liberty's torch. Additional amenities include retail space, a restaurant, a VIP lounge, and a pool deck for hotel guests. Renderings showcase its prominent position in the Midtown skyline.

== Construction history ==
=== Initial proposals and construction work ===
The site of 740 Eighth Avenue has had several development proposals, including a moderately tall glass tower, and a slim, cylindrical supertall tower, both in the 2010s. The cylindrical tower was a concept named 265 West 45th Street and would have risen 1,312 feet (400 m) had it been built.

The site underwent excavation starting in 2022, while foundation work commenced by 2023. Full-color renderings of The Torch were revealed in March 2024 by Extell.

=== Construction stalls ===
Construction stalled in March 2024, and the New York City Department of Buildings confirmed no activity at the site during inspections in May 2024. While no official stop-work orders have been issued, the site faced legal and logistical issues, including lawsuits over unsafe conditions and unpaid services owed to subcontractors. The project has also been embroiled in financial disputes, with Extell and its contractors reportedly owing over $2 million to Bronx-based CFS Steel Company for unpaid services. Despite the challenges, the foundation had been completed, and diagonal beams buttressed the retaining walls in preparation for resumed activity.

Residents and businesses near the site, including the Playwright Celtic Pub, welcomed the pause in construction, citing relief from excessive noise and disruption. However, the incomplete state of the project continued to negatively impact the area's economy.

=== Construction resumes ===
Construction restarted in June 2025. The Torch rose above street level by July 2025 and has been rising steadily ever since.

In October 2026, it was announced that the hotel will be operated by Hyatt under their Standard Hotels brand as The StandardX Times Square. The building's official street address was also changed to 255 West 45th Street.

== See also ==
- List of tallest buildings in the United States
- List of tallest buildings in New York City
- List of tallest hotels
