= Superior Lake =

Superior Lake may refer to:

- Lake Superior, one of the Great Lakes
- Superior Lake (California)

== See also ==
- Lake Superior (disambiguation)
