= Superia =

Superia may refer to:

- Superia (video game), a Norwegian game based on Adventure Rock
- Superia (comics), a fictional character in the Marvel Comics universe
- Fujifilm Superia, a brand of photographic film
- Superior craton or Superia

== See also ==
- Superior (disambiguation)
