= Superior Aviation =

Superior Aviation may refer to:

- Superior Aviation Beijing, a Chinese aviation holding company
- Superior Aviation (airline), a US-based airline
