= Superior Bank =

Superior Bank may refer to:

- Superior Bancorp - a bank holding company that suffered from bank failure in 2011
- Superior Bank of Chicago
