= Superior Township =

Superior Township may refer to:

- Superior Township, Dickinson County, Iowa
- Superior Township, Osage County, Kansas, in Osage County, Kansas
- Superior Township, McPherson County, Kansas
- Superior Township, Chippewa County, Michigan
- Superior Township, Washtenaw County, Michigan
- Superior Township, Eddy County, North Dakota, in Eddy County, North Dakota
- Superior Township, Williams County, Ohio

== See also ==
- Superior (disambiguation)
