= Superior multimineral process =

Superior multimineral process McDowell–Wellman process
- Process type: Chemical
- Industrial sector(s): Chemical industry oil industry
- Feedstock: oil shale
- Product(s): shale oil
- Leading companies: Superior Oil Company
- Developer(s): Superior Oil Company

The Superior multimineral process (also known as the McDowell–Wellman process or circular grate process) is an above ground shale oil extraction technology designed for production of shale oil, a type of synthetic crude oil. The process heats oil shale in a sealed horizontal segmented vessel (retort) causing its decomposition into shale oil, oil shale gas and spent residue. The particularities of this process is a recovery of saline minerals from the oil shale, and a doughnut-shape of the retort. The process is suitable for processing of mineral-rich oil shales, such as in the Piceance Basin. It has a relatively high reliability and high oil yield. The technology was developed by the American oil company Superior Oil.

== History ==
The multimineral process was developed by Superior Oil Company, now part of ExxonMobil, for processing of the Piceance Basin's oil shale. The technology tests were carried out in pilot plants in Cleveland, Ohio. In the 1970s, Superior Oil planned a commercial-size demonstration plant in the northern Piceance Basin area with a capacity of 11,500 to 13,000 barrels (1,830 to 2,070 m^{3}) of shale oil per day; however, because of low crude oil price these plans were never implemented.

== Process ==
The process was developed to combine the shale oil production with production of sodium bicarbonate, sodium carbonate, and aluminum from nahcolite and dawsonite, occurring in oil shales of the Piceance Basin. In this process, the nahcolite is recovered from the raw oil shale by crushing it to lumps smaller than 8 inches (200 mm). As a result, most of the nahcolite in the oil shale becomes a fine powder what could screened out. Screened oil shale lumps are further crushed to particles smaller than 3 inches (76 mm). Oil shale particles are further processed in a horizontal segmented doughnut-shaped traveling-grate retort in the direct or indirect heating mode. The retort was originally designed by Davy McKee Corporation for iron ore pelletizing and it also known as the Dravo retort. In the direct retort, oil shale moves past ducts through which are provided hot inert gas for heating the raw oil shale, air for combustion of carbon residue (char or semi-coke) in the spent oil shale, and cold inert gas for cooling the spent oil shale. The oil pyrolysis takes place in the heating section. To minimize solubility of aluminium compounds in the oil shale, the heat control is a crucial factor. Necessary heat for pyrolysis is generated in the carbon recovery section by combustion of carbon residue (char or semi-coke) remained in the spent oil shale. While blowing inert gases through the spent oil shale, the spent oil shale is cooled and gases are heated to cause pyrolysis. The indirect mode is similar; the difference is that combustion of carbonaceous residue takes place in separate vessel. The last section is for discharging of oil shale ash. Aluminium oxide and sodium carbonate are recovered from calcined dawsonite and calcined nahcolite in the oil shale ash.

== Advantages ==
The traveling-grate retort allows close temperature control, and therefore better control of dawsonite's solubility during the burning stage. During retorting, there is no relative movement of oil shale, which avoids dust creation, and therefore increase the quality of generated products. The oil recovery yields greater than 98% Fischer Assay. The technology has also a relatively high reliability. The sealed system of this process has environmental advantage as it prevents gas and mist leakage.

== See also ==
- Alberta Taciuk Process
- Galoter process
- Fushun process
- Kiviter process
- Lurgi-Ruhrgas process
- Petrosix
- TOSCO II process
- Union process
