= Mother Superior (disambiguation) =

A Mother Superior is a prioress or abbess: the nun in charge of a religious community.

Mother Superior may also refer to:

== Music ==
- Mother Superior (band), an American rock band 1993–2011
- "Mother Superior", a song by Good Riddance from the 1995 album For God and Country
- "Mother Superior", a song by Katzenjammer from the 2008 album Le Pop
- "Mother Superior", a song by Coheed and Cambria from the 2007 album Good Apollo, I'm Burning Star IV, Volume Two: No World for Tomorrow
- "Mother Superior", a song by Hurricane #1 from the 1997 album Hurricane #1

== Fictional characters ==
- Mother Superior, alias of Marvel Comics character Sinthea Shmidt
- Mother Superior, nickname of Johnny Swann in the novel Trainspotting

== See also ==
- Superior (hierarchy)
