= Superior High School =

Superior High School may refer to any of the following:

- Superior Junior/Senior High School (Arizona)
- Superior High School (Montana)
- Superior High School (Wisconsin)
