= Chinh Chu =

American business executive

- Born: Vietnam
- Citizenship: American
- Education: University at Buffalo (BS, 1988)
- Occupation: Business executive
- Known for: CC Capital

Chinh Chu is an American business executive. He is the founder and senior managing director of CC Capital, a firm based in New York City. Before establishing CC Capital, Chu spent 25 years at the Blackstone Group, where he was the firm's longest-serving dealmaker and co-chair of Private Equity.

== Early life and education ==
Chu was born in Vietnam and fled the country with his family in 1975 at the age of eight, settling in the United States as a refugee. He graduated summa cum laude from the University at Buffalo School of Management in 1988.

== Career ==
Chu began his career on Wall Street in the mergers and acquisitions department at Salomon Brothers. Two years later, in 1990, he joined Blackstone Group. Over his 25-year career at the firm, he served as a Senior Managing Director and co-chair of Private Equity. He was involved in some of the firm's largest transactions, including the acquisitions of the water-treatment company Nalco Holding Company for over $4 billion and the German-based chemical company Celanese for $3.8 billion. He also oversaw the firm's investments in the financial services, technology and healthcare sectors.

Chu departed Blackstone in 2015 to launch his own investment firm, CC Capital. He remained a senior advisor to Blackstone following his departure. Since then, Chu has led deals investing in Dun & Bradstreet, Utz Brands, a snack food company, F&G Annuities & Life, Inc., and Wilshire.

In 2024, CC Capital agreed to a $250 million investment to create an insurance and asset management firm by combining Arena Investors and a new life insurance business under Westaim Corp.

In January 2025, CC Capital Partners made a A$2.9 billion (US$1.8 billion) takeover offer for Australian wealth manager Insignia Financial Ltd.
