= W. M. Keck Foundation =

American charitable foundation

- Founded: 1954
- Founder: William Myron Keck
- Purpose: supporting scientific, engineering, and medical research
- Location: Los Angeles, California, U.S.
- Region served: United States
- Website: www.wmkeck.org

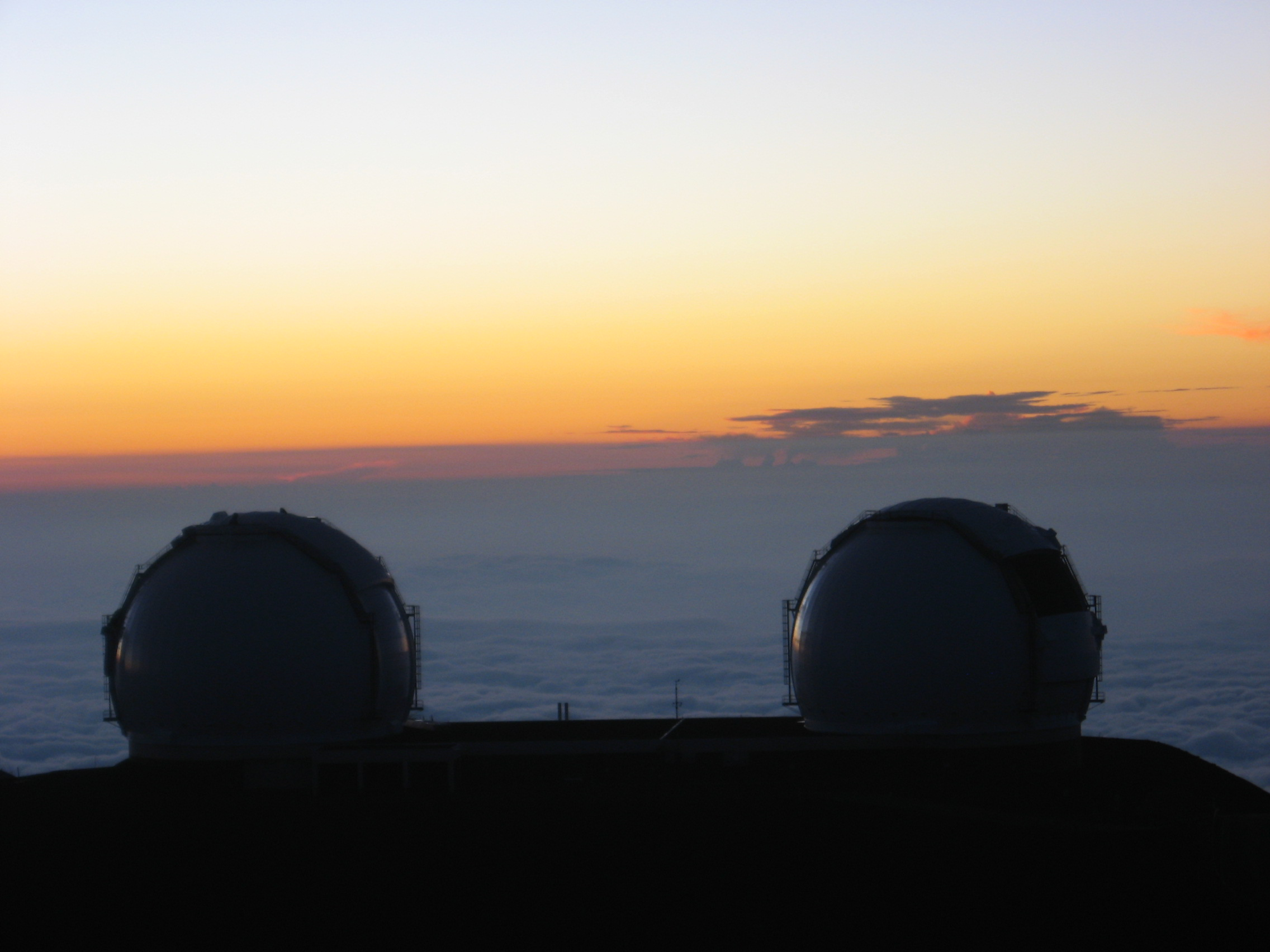
W. M. Keck Observatory at dawn, Mauna Kea, Hawaii

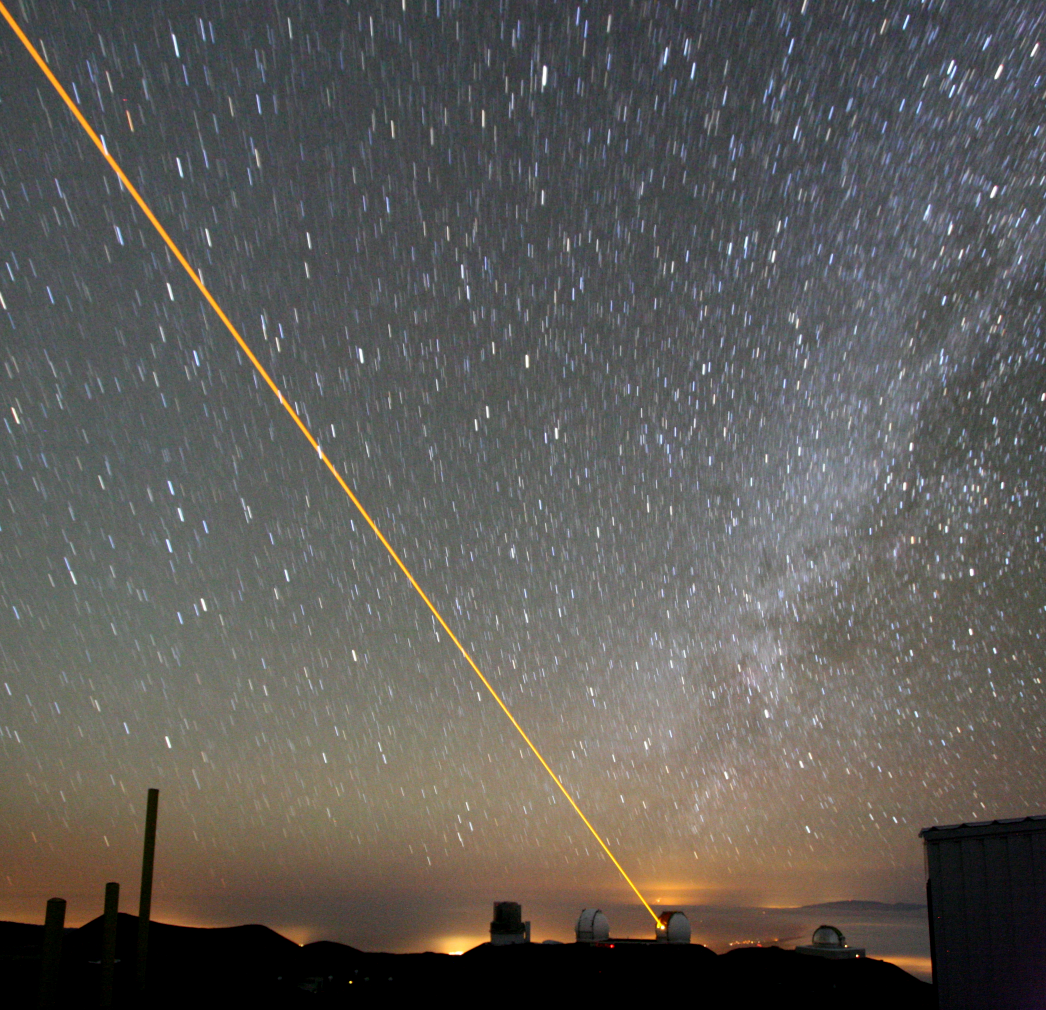
The Keck II telescope on Mauna Kea, Hawaii projects a laser beam into the night sky to form an artificial guide star for adaptive optics. The galactic plane of the Milky Way is visible in the sky to the right of the image. The stars are trailed in this 3 minute fixed camera exposure due to the rotation of the earth.

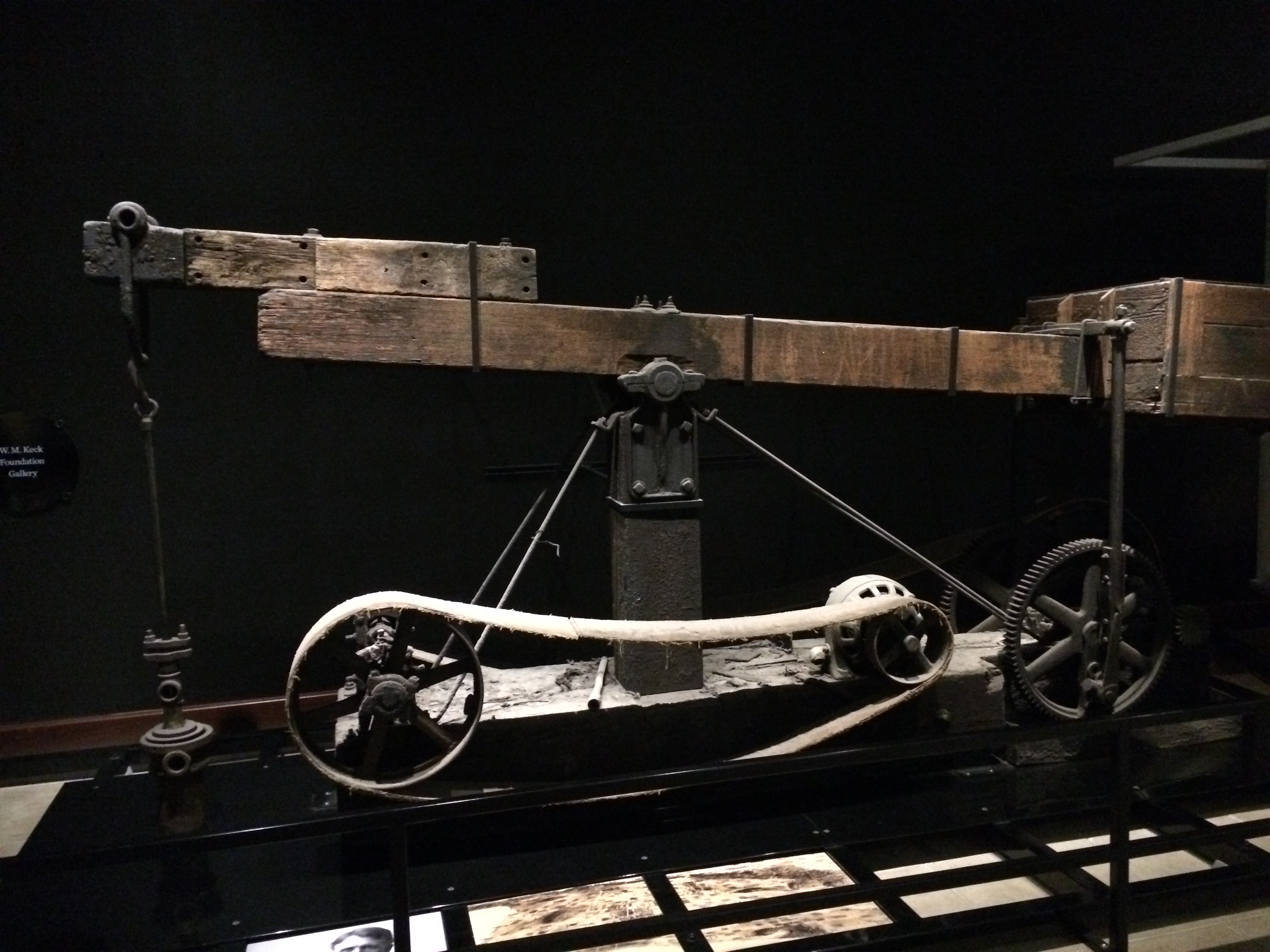
Old pumpjack in the W. M. Keck Foundation Gallery, Natural History Museum of Los Angeles County

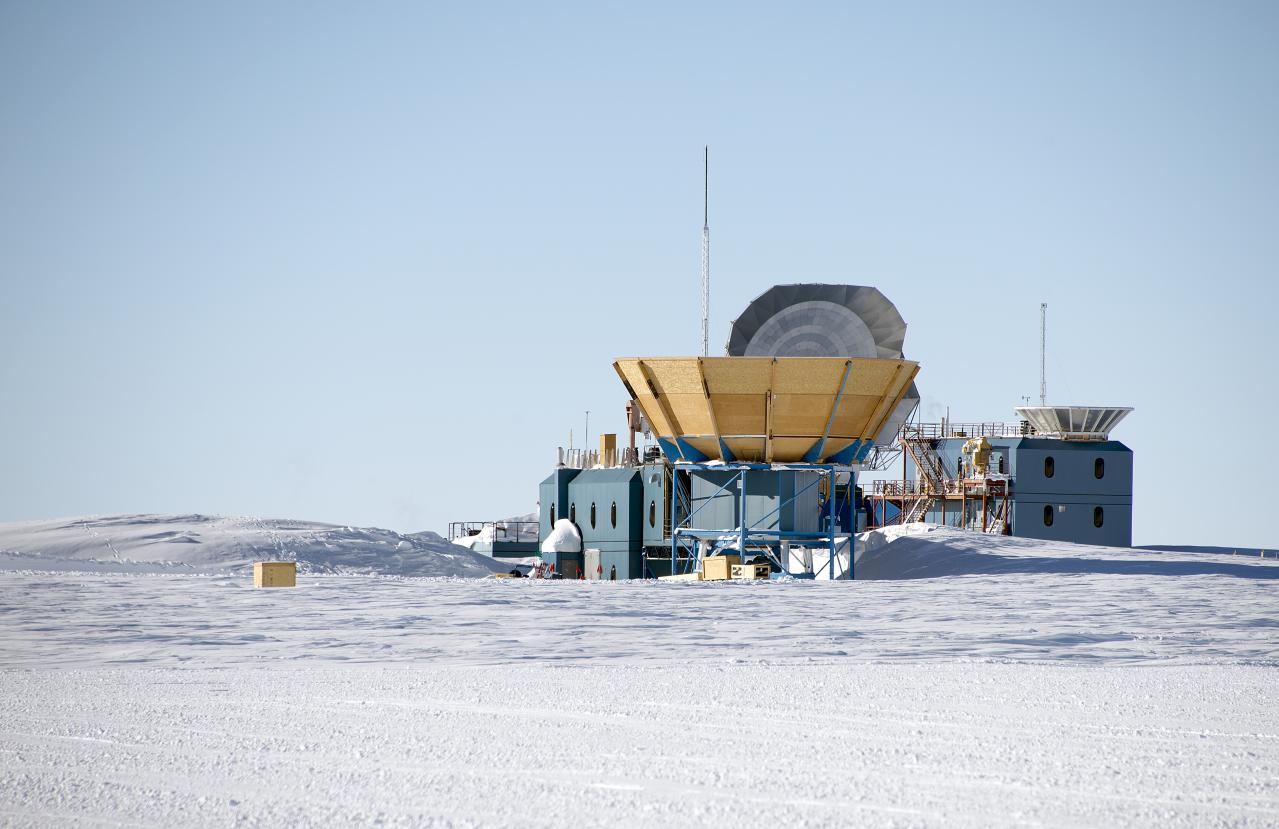
The Keck Array at the South Pole observatory, Antarctica.

The W. M. Keck Foundation is an American charitable foundation supporting scientific, engineering, and medical research in the United States. It was founded in 1954 by William Myron Keck, founder and president of Superior Oil Company (part of ExxonMobil since 1999). The Foundation's net assets exceeded $1.3 billion at the end of 2019.

== Overview ==
From its founding until his death in 1964, the Foundation was led by William Myron Keck. From 1964 to 1995, it was led by W. M. Keck's son, Howard B. Keck. Robert Addison Day, W. M. Keck's grandson, became its president and chairman in 1995. He continued to serve as its chairman until his death in 2023.

The foundation is led by Joseph Day and Stephen M. Keck.

The Foundation provides grants in five broad areas: science and engineering research, undergraduate science and engineering, medical research, liberal arts, in Southern California. Some of the more notable projects that have received funding from the Keck Foundation include:

- 2017: The Keck Center for Science and Engineering, at Chapman University, $21 million
- 2015: The Keck Laboratory for Network Physiology at Boston University, $1 million
- The W. M. Keck Center for Language Study at Colgate University
- The Keck Center for International and Strategic Studies of Claremont McKenna College (the alma mater of Robert Addison Day, William Myron Keck's grandson, and chairman and president of W. M. Keck Foundation)
- The W.M. Keck Science Department of Claremont McKenna College, Pitzer College, and Scripps College.
- The W.M. Keck Center for Noncoding RNA University of California, San Francisco
- The Keck Hall and the W.M. Keck Center for Interdisciplinary Bioscience Training at Rice University in Houston, Texas (training arm of the Gulf Coast Consortia (GCC))
- Support for building of the Keck Observatory at Pacific Lutheran University in Tacoma, Washington
- 1985, 1991: Construction of the W. M. Keck Observatory at Mauna Kea Observatory in Hawaii, Keck I, Keck II, about $70 million for each
- Keck Institute for Space Studies, established in 2008, a joint institute of the California Institute of Technology and the Jet Propulsion Laboratory
- 1999: Expansion of the Keck School of Medicine at the University of Southern California in Los Angeles, California, $110 million
- The W.M. Keck Building Center for fMRI & the W.M. Keck Foundation Center for Ocean-Atmosphere Research at the University of California, San Diego
- Creation of the Keck Graduate Institute of Applied Life Sciences in Claremont, California
- Sponsor of the Keck Computer Science Lab at Loyola Marymount University in Los Angeles, California
- The W.M. Keck Center for Accelerator Mass Spectrometry at University of California, Irvine
- The WM Keck Center for 3D Innovation at University of Texas at El Paso
- The William M. Keck Building at the California Institute of Technology
- The Peter G. Peterson Institute for International Economics in Washington D.C.
- The Keck Science Center at Pepperdine University
- The Keck Array, part of the BICEP experiment (Background Imaging of Cosmic Extragalactic Polarization) at the South Pole observatory.
- W.M. Keck Earth Science and Metal Engineering Museum at the Mackay School of Earth Sciences and Engineering, whose renovation the foundation funded, at the University of Nevada, Reno
- The Keck Theater at Occidental College

The Keck Foundation has been a long-time supporter of public television in Southern California, including underwriting the broadcast of Sesame Street on KCET since the 1970s.

== Research funding ==
Research Program funding as of 2014 had a maximum grant of $5 million over 5 years, though funding is typically $2 million or less.

The W. M. Keck Research Program had these requirements for its 2015 grant cycle:

- Research that is high impact and that questions or challenges the prevailing paradigm
- Research projects that no one else is pursuing
- A new research project that is in its early stages
- Basic research, not translational or clinical research
- Research that would result in general information and new methodologies that can be of benefit to the field, even if the project were to go awry
- Research projects that are not funded by any other foundation, and research projects that could not move along without Keck funding
- Though this is not a requirement, the W.M. Keck Foundation prefers projects that involve some kind of collaboration over single investigator research

== See also ==
- List of wealthiest charitable foundations
