= William Myron Keck =

American businessman (1880–1964)

William M. Keck
- Born: April 27, 1880
- Died: August 20, 1964 (aged 84)
- Resting place: San Gabriel Cemetery, San Gabriel, California, U.S.
- Occupations: Businessman, philanthropist
- Known for: Founding Superior Oil Company and the W. M. Keck Foundation

William Myron Keck (April 27, 1880 – August 20, 1964) was an American businessman and philanthropist. He was best known as the founder of Superior Oil Company. Author Kevin Krajick has described Keck as "the world's greatest oil prospector, a man whose instincts about the location of petroleum were so uncanny, some believed him clairvoyant." Keck established the W. M. Keck Foundation.

== Early life ==
William Myron Keck was born on April 27, 1880. After his father left home to work in the oil fields, he landed a job selling sandwiches and candy on the Baltimore and Ohio Railroad to support his mother.

== Business career ==
=== Drilling as a speculator ===
In his younger years, he became a "roustabout" in the oil business in Pennsylvania, before making his way to California, where he worked as a speculator, drilling wells on contract for big oil companies. He often would take payment as leases instead of cash. He struck oil in Huntington Beach and in California's Kettleman Hills oil fields. Keck was very successful as an oil prospector. In one instance at the height of the 1920s oil boom in Los Angeles, he was the only "wildcatter" to retain a lease on 300 acres of Andrew Joughin's farm outside Torrance. While other prospectors turned away from the property, Keck's "46 highly productive wells were considered one of California's most successful oil-drilling projects".

=== Establishing Superior Oil ===
By 1921, he had accumulated enough leases to start his own firm. In 1921, Keck founded the Superior Oil Company in Coalinga, California. The company focused on the exploration and production of oil and natural gas, and was involved with a number of new methods under Keck. Under Keck, in 1930 the company was the first to successfully use directional drilling in California.

Author Kevin Krajick has described Keck as "the world's greatest oil prospector, a man whose instincts about the location of petroleum were so uncanny, some believed him clairvoyant." He was one of the first oilmen to move his business to Houston, Texas, and by 1931, his company had wells in Texas, Oklahoma, Nebraska, Louisiana and Venezuela.

=== Growth of Superior ===
In 1933, under Keck the company was the first to use a reflection seismograph to help with finding hydrocarbons. Keck was a pioneer in deep offshore drilling, and in 1938, the company constructed the first offshore oil platform off the coast of Louisiana. The first independent to drill offshore in the Gulf of Mexico, he was the first to find commercial deposits in the Gulf of Mexico, where he set consecutive records for the deepest-drilled well. Running his company like a "one-man machine", he kept control of the company's stock after it went public. The company also became the largest independent oil producer in the United States. According to author Kevin Krajick, Keck also "practically ran the oil-rich nation of Venezuela." Keck was an active stalwart of the oil lobby politically, in part through his attorney Harold Morton and lobbyist Monroe Butler. Upon his death in 1964, his son William M. Keck Jr. became Superior's chief executive officer, followed by leadership from his second son Howard. He served as chairman of Superior. At one point, his fortune was estimated at $160 million, and at the time of his death, he and his family owned 51 per cent of Superior's shares.

== Personal life ==
He had several children with his wife, Alice Bertha Cominski: Willametta Keck, Howard Keck, and William M. Keck Jr. In 1956, Keck purchased the historic Owlwood Estate in Los Angeles, installing a "24 carat gold bathroom sink feature shaped like an oil rig."

== Death and legacy ==
Keck died in 1964. Most of his estate was left to his three children, and he also left five beneficiary trusts for USC, Stanford, Pomona College, Occidental College and the Church of Our Savior in San Gabriel.

In 1985, the gifts were sent to the five beneficiary institutions, with The New York Times reporting that "four California colleges and an Episcopal church have received $40 million more from William M. Keck's trusts, bringing to $130 million the value of his bequests to those institutions." USC said it was the largest gift in its history, and Stanford said their sum was "the largest unrestricted bequest we have ever received." It was also the largest sum gifted to both Occidental and Pomona.

Although his estate was estimated to be worth upward of $160 million, he died owing $36.4 million to three banks in New York and Texas. He left his widow, Sylvia Jean Keck, with "$400,000 outright and trust income from 4,000 shares of stock valued at $6.34 million." His two daughters and two sons were left "nothing specifically. They are said to be independently wealthy." The family house was willed to the William M. Keck Foundation. Another 11,000 shares of Superior stock, valued at $17 million in 1964, were placed in trust to be divided among the University of Southern California, Pomona College, Occidental College, and the Episcopal Church of Our Saviour, San Gabriel, California.

=== Philanthropy ===
In 1954 he founded the W. M. Keck Foundation, one of the largest philanthropic foundations in the United States. The organization has funded the W. M. Keck Observatory in Hawaii, the Keck School of Medicine at USC, the Keck Graduate Institute at the Claremont Colleges, and the Keck Institute for Space Studies at Caltech and NASA's Jet Propulsion Laboratory. His foundation provided $70 million of the $87 million cost of the Keck Telescope on the summit of Hawaii's Mauna Kea volcano, which upon its start of construction in 1990, was to be the largest astronomical telescope in the world.
