= Superior Lake (California) =

Lake in the state of California, United States

- Location within California Location within the United States
- Location: Mojave Desert; San Bernardino County, California
- Coordinates: 35°14′42″N 117°01′34″W
- Type: Endorheic basin
- Primary outflows: Terminal (evaporation)
- Basin countries: United States
- Max. length: 15 km (9.3 mi)
- Max. width: 6 km (3.7 mi)
- Shore length^{1}: 30 km (19 mi)
- Surface elevation: 914 m (2,999 ft)
- Sections/sub-basins: Three
- References: U.S. Geological Survey Geographic Names Information System: Superior Lake
- ^{1} Shore length is not a well-defined measure.

Superior Lake is a dry lake basin in the Mojave Desert of San Bernardino County, California, 40 km (25 mi) north of Barstow. The lake is made up of three basins, approximately 15 km (9.3 mi) long and 6 km (3.7 mi) at its widest point. Through the Holocene, this three-lake system was one body of water.

== See also ==
- List of lakes in California
