= Superior Oil Company =

Defunct American oil company

The Superior Oil Company

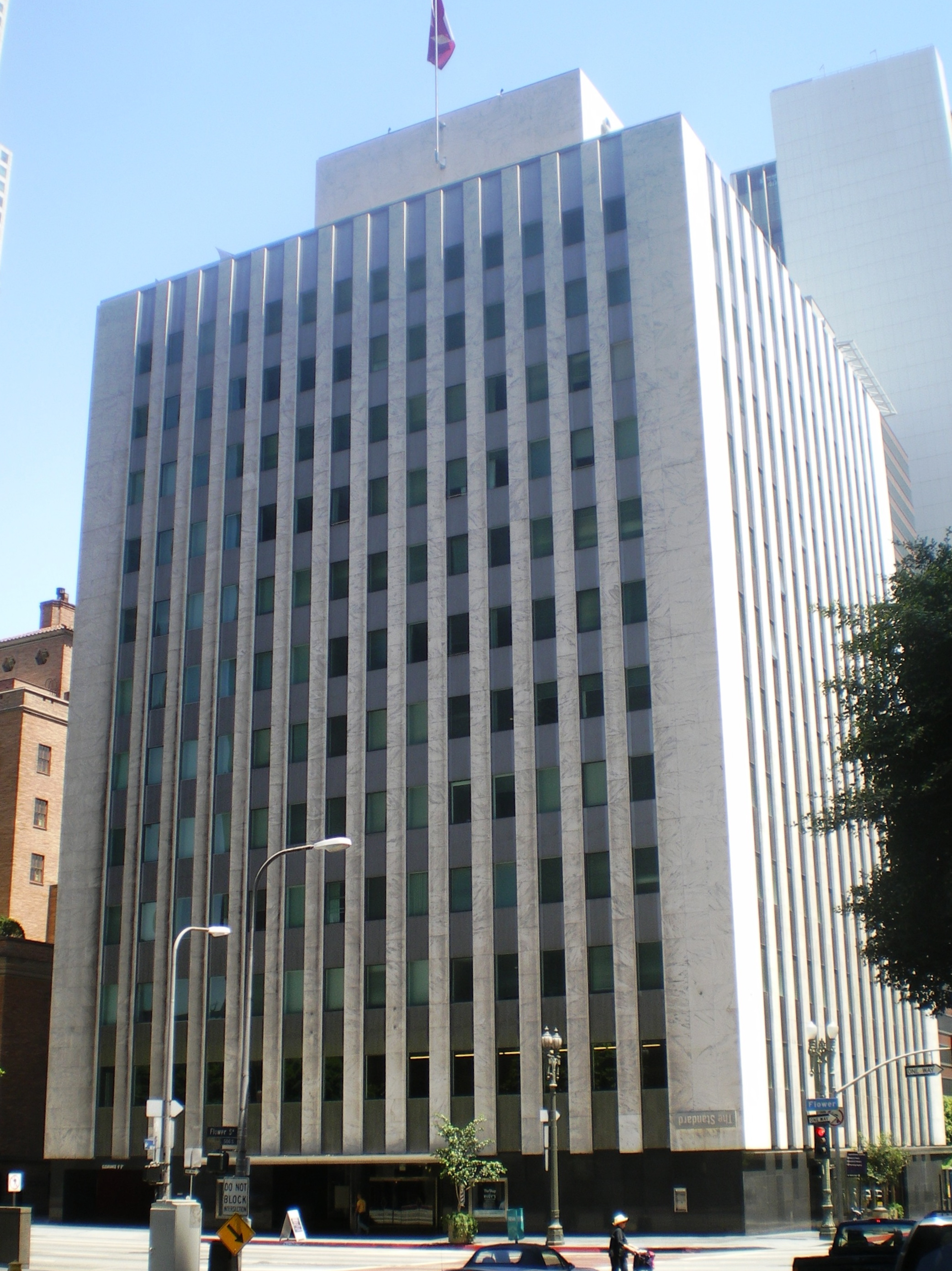
- The Superior Oil Building in Los Angeles, opened in 1956
- Company type: Public
- Industry: Petroleum
- Founded: 1921
- Founder: William Myron Keck
- Defunct: 1984; 42 years ago
- Fate: Acquired by Mobil
- Headquarters: The Superior Oil Company Building, Los Angeles, California

The Superior Oil Company was an American oil company founded in 1921 in Coalinga, California, by William Myron Keck, Superior Oil began as a drilling contracting firm and grew into the exploration and production of oil and natural gas. In 1930 the company was the first to successfully use directional drilling in California. Moving to Houston, Texas.

By 1931 the company had wells in Texas, Oklahoma, Nebraska, Louisiana and Venezuela. In 1938, the company constructed the first offshore oil platform off the coast of Louisiana in the Gulf of Mexico. In the 1970s, Superior Oil was involved in the oil shale industry developing the Superior multimineral process. In September 1984 the company, then based in Houston, became a wholly owned subsidiary of Mobil. The company was sold to Mobil Corporation in 1984, merging into it.

== History ==
=== Background ===
Company founder William Myron Keck, also founder of the W. M. Keck Foundation, started his career as a "roustabout" in the oil business in Pennsylvania, before making his way to California. In California, he worked as a speculator drilling wells on contract for big oil companies. He often would take payment as leases instead of cash. Keck was very successful as an oil prospector. In one instance at the height of the oil boom in the 1920s in Los Angeles, he was the only "wildcatter" to purchase and retain a lease on 300 acres of Andrew Joughin's farm outside Torrance. While other prospectors turned away from the property, Keck's "46 highly productive wells were considered one of California's most successful oil-drilling projects. Keck also struck oil in California's Huntington Beach and Kettleman Hills oil fields. Author Kevin Krajick has described Keck as "the world's greatest oil prospector, a man whose instincts about the location of petroleum were so uncanny, some believed him clairvoyant."

=== 1921-1962: Founding and techniques ===
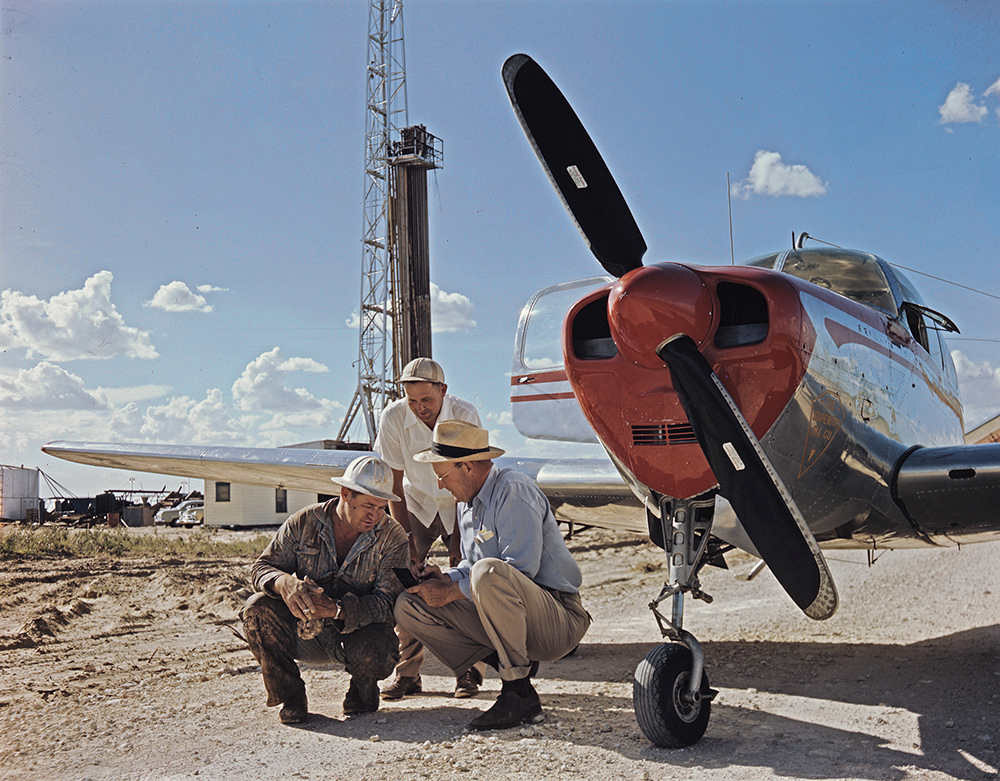
Superior Oil drill site, West Texas 1949

The Superior Oil Company was founded in 1921 in Coalinga, California, by Keck, after he had accumulated enough leases to start his own firm. Superior Oil began as a drilling contracting firm and grew into other oil services including exploration and production of oil and natural gas. The company soon focused on the exploration and production of oil and gas, and was involved with a number of new methods. In 1930 the company was the first to successfully use directional drilling in California. Keck was one of the first oilmen to move his business to Houston, Texas, and by 1931, the company had wells in Texas, Oklahoma, Nebraska, Louisiana and Venezuela.

In 1933, the company was the first to use a reflection seismograph to help with finding hydrocarbons. The company was also a "pioneer" in deep offshore drilling. The first independent to drill offshore in the Gulf of Mexico and the first to find commercial deposits in the Gulf of Mexico, in 1938, the company constructed the first offshore oil platform off the coast of Louisiana in cooperation with Pure Oil, another independent producer. In the Gulf, Superior set consecutive records for the deepest-drilled well. The company also became the largest independent oil producer in the United States, and according to author Kevin Krajick, Keck "practically ran the oil-rich nation of Venezuela."

The marble-clad Superior Oil Company Building was constructed in 1952 in Los Angeles, California as an office building by the Keck family to serve as the headquarters for Superior Oil Company. Completed in 1955, the Modern architecture 12 story structure was designed by Claud Beelman and became "one of the area's most significant examples of the postwar modernism style popular in corporate architecture during the 1950s."

=== 1963-1983: Change in leadership ===
From the company's founding in 1921 until 1963, Superior Oil was led by its founder, W. M. Keck. Running his company like a "one-man machine," Keck kept control of the company's stock after it went public. The elder Keck served as chairman of Superior, and at the time of his death in 1964, his family owned 51 per cent of Superior's shares. Upon Keck's death, his son William M. Keck Jr. became Superior's chief executive officer, followed by leadership from Keck's second son Howard B. Keck from 1963 until 1981. Upon Keck's death, 11,000 shares of Superior stock, valued at $17 million in 1964, were placed in trust to be divided among the University of Southern California, Pomona College, Occidental College, and the Episcopal Church of Our Saviour, San Gabriel, California.

In the 1970s, Superior Oil was involved in the oil shale industry developing the Superior multimineral process. In 1976, its revenues were $441 million. By 1978, Mobil was suing Superior Oil for "raiding" talent by hiring 32 of Mobil's exploration and production experts. Howard Keck retired as chairman in 1981, but retained "firm control" of the board. In September 1981, chairman and CEO Joseph E. Reid resigned from his positions, succeeded by former president and COO Fred C. Ackman, who also remained president. At the end of 1982, the company had domestic crude oil reserves of 139 million barrels, and domestic natural gas reserves of 1.8 trillion cubic feet. Unlike many other oil companies of the time, it had no petroleum refining and marketing operations. Superior Oil's 1983 sales came to $1.8 billion.

=== 1983-1984: Acquisition by Mobil ===
In October 1983, Howard B. Keck stepped down as a director, while still controlling 18.4 percent of the company, saying he wanted to sell his stake. In late 1983, an "uneasy truce" was reached between two major stockholders, former chairman Howard B. Keck and his sister Willametta Keck Day. Day had in April of that year "led a stockholder revolt" leading to changes in Superior's bylaws, requiring the company's management to consider takeover bids. Howard Keck had opposed the bylaw change. He reversed his position on the bylaws November 1983 and disclosed his intention to sell his stake. Several months before March 1984, the Keck family, which owned a total of about 22 percent of the stock of Superior, approached Mobil Corporation (now part of ExxonMobil) with an offer to sell the family stock.

In March 1984, Mobil announced that it had "secretly" agreed to buy the 22 percent, and would offer the company's remaining stockholders the same price, at $45 a share. In March 1984, Superior Oil was in the process of being acquired by Mobil for $5.7 billion. At that time the company was the nation's largest independent oil producer. The takeover was completed in September 1984, with Superior, then based in Houston, becoming a wholly owned subsidiary of Mobil. It was the fifth-largest oil merger in history, with the combined companies having over $60 billion in combined sales. Among other changes, in February 1985 it was reported that Mobil was planning on selling an unprofitable Idaho gold mine it had acquired when it purchased Superior.

== See also ==
- Superior Oil Company Building
