= Calvin Ryder =

American architect

- Born: 1810; Orrington, Maine
- Died: 1890 (aged 79–80); Bangor, Maine
- Occupation: Architect

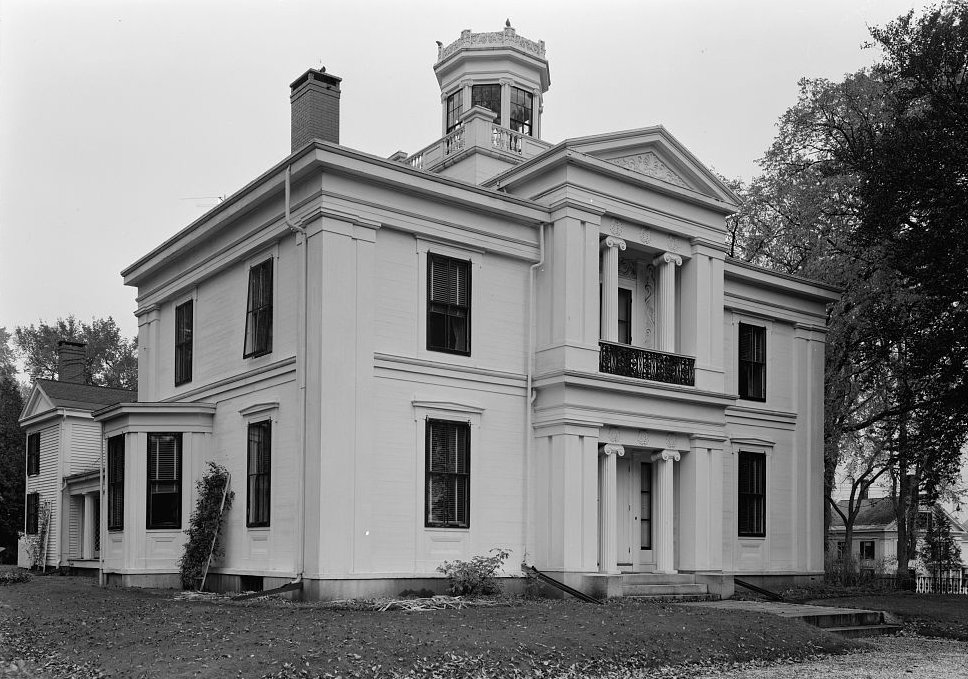
House for James P. White, Belfast, Maine, 1840.

Calvin Ryder (1810–1890) was an American architect who practiced in Maine and Massachusetts. A number of his surviving buildings are listed on the National Register of Historic Places.

== Life and career ==
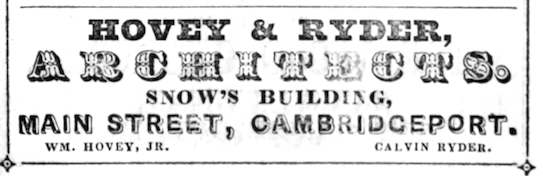
Advertisement for the firm of Hovey & Ryder in the Cambridge Directory and Almanac for 1850.

Ryder was born in Orrington, Maine, but by 1831 was residing in nearby Bangor, Maine with his brother Perry, a plane-maker. Within two years he had relocated a few miles down the Penobscot River to Winterport, Maine (then part of Frankfort), where he received his first known commission, the Winterport Congregational Church (1833). Ryder was likely the builder as well as the architect for this and other early commissions.

In the early 1840s Ryder designed and built at least four Greek Revival houses in the port of Belfast, Maine, just south of Winterport: the Sherburne Sleeper House (1840), Hiram Alden House (1840), James P. White House (1842), and Joseph Williamson House (1844–45). The White House, the only one to remain entirely unaltered, has since become a famous coastal Maine icon, particularly for its glass cupola. Ryder was threatened with debtor’s prison in 1846 and relocated to Boston.

In Boston, Ryder went into partnership with William Hovey, later with Enoch Fuller, and still later with Edward D. Harris. His major idiom in the 1850s-60s became the Mansard style, and he pioneered its use in a number of wooden mansions around Boston and Cambridge. A design for he sent back to Bangor, Maine for the William Blake House (1858), built by his sister and brother-in-law, established a look which came to define that city’s domestic architecture in the 1860s. His masterpiece in this idiom, the Charles G. Sterns House (1866) in Bangor, was unfortunately destroyed in the 1930s.

Ryder died unexpectedly while visiting his sister and brother-in-law in Bangor (in their house of his design) and was buried in nearby Winterport, Maine.
