= Toby Tyler or 10 Weeks with a Circus =

1960 film by Charles Barton

- Theatrical release poster
- Directed by: Charles Barton
- Written by: Lillie Hayward; Bill Walsh
- Based on: Toby Tyler; or, Ten Weeks with a Circus by James Otis Kaler
- Produced by: Bill Walsh
- Starring: Kevin Corcoran; Henry Calvin; Gene Sheldon; Richard Eastham
- Music by: Buddy Baker
- Production company: Walt Disney Productions
- Distributed by: Buena Vista Distribution
- Release date: January 21, 1960 (Sarasota, FL)
- Running time: 96 minutes
- Country: United States
- Language: English
- Box office: $3,100,000 (US/Canada rentals)

Toby Tyler or 10 Weeks with a Circus, also known simply as Toby Tyler, is a 1960 American drama film directed by Charles Barton and starring Kevin Corcoran, Henry Calvin, Gene Sheldon, and Richard Eastham. It was produced by Walt Disney Productions and distributed by Buena Vista Distribution Company on January 21, 1960. It is based on the 1880 children's book Toby Tyler; or, Ten Weeks with a Circus by James Otis Kaler.

The film, shot at Golden Oak Ranch in Newhall, California, later aired on the Walt Disney anthology television series.

== Plot ==
After his stern Uncle Daniel describes him as a "millstone" for neglecting his chores, ten-year-old Toby Tyler runs away from his foster home to join the circus. There, he soon befriends Mr. Stubbs, a frisky chimpanzee. However, the circus isn't all fun and games; his employer Harry Tupper, the candy vendor, is dishonest and greedy. He convinces Toby that his Aunt Olive and Uncle Daniel don't love him or want him back and hides their letters. Toby resigns himself to circus life, even scoring himself a much bigger role, when he replaces the uppity, self-centered boy bareback rider after an injury. When Toby discovers, with the help of Mr. Stubbs, that Harry lied to him about his aunt and uncle, he departs the circus for home. Mr. Stubbs follows him and Toby decides to take the chimp home with him. Soon after, though, Mr. Stubbs is chased by a hunter's dog. The hunter, Jim Weaver, accidentally shoots Mr. Stubbs just as Harry arrives to haul Toby back to the circus.

Back at the circus, Toby finds his aunt and uncle in attendance, leading to a tearful reunion. When Harry tries to pursue Toby, he's obstructed by Ben, who confronts him for tampering with Toby's mail and warns him to leave him alone. Joyfully, just before Toby's performance, with his family in attendance, he discovers that Mr. Stubbs has survived his wounds, having been brought back to the circus by Jim. Relieved, Toby begins his performance on horseback, only to have Mr. Stubbs jump down from the trapeze to join him, thus creating a wonderful new act for the circus.

== Cast ==
Role	Actor
Toby Tyler	Kevin Corcoran
Harry Tupper	Bob Sweeney
Sam Treat	Gene Sheldon
Benjamin Obadiah "Ben" Cotter	Henry Calvin
Colonel Sam Castle	Richard Eastham
Jim Weaver	James Drury
Mademoiselle Jeanette	Barbara Beaird
Monsieur Ajax	Dennis Olivieri
Aunt Olive	Edith Evanson
Uncle Daniel	Tom Fadden
Circus Cook (uncredited)	Henry Rowland
Roustabout (uncredited)	Kermit Maynard
Drummer (uncredited)	James MacDonald
Bandleader (as Ollie Wallace)	Oliver Wallace
Downtown Parade Organist	James Dietrich
Concession Worker	Michael McGreevey
Jailbird (uncredited)	William Challee
Roustabout (uncredited)	John Cliff
Ringling Brothers Clown (uncredited)	'Eddie Spaghetti' Emerson
Ringling Brothers Clown (uncredited)	Abe Goldstein
Townsman (uncredited)	Sam Harris
Ringling Brothers Clown (uncredited)	Duke Johnson
Ringling Brothers Clown (uncredited)	Harry C. Johnson
Sheriff (uncredited)	Jess Kirkpatrick
Wife in Audience (uncredited)	Ruth Lee
Townsman (uncredited)	Herbert Lytton
Ticket-Taker (uncredited)	Howard Negley
Jailbird (uncredited)	William Newell
Undetermined Secondary Role (uncredited)	Barry Seltzer
Husband in Audience (uncredited)	Robert Shayne
Townsman (uncredited)	Guy Wilkerson

== Reception ==
Howard Thompson of The New York Times wrote: "The kids will love 'Toby Tyler' and his circus world. Leave it to a shrewd old master like Walt Disney to package a simple, warm and sentimental little yarn about an orphan boy and the big top." Variety called it "a warm-hearted, chucklesome film" with a script that "has a number of good laughs, and consistently maintains interest even for the more sophisticated adults." John L. Scott of the Los Angeles Times wrote: "Disney's knack of taking a simple theme, usually a small boy and his pet animal, and building it into a box-office product is again exemplified in 'Toby Tyler' ... Mr. Stubbs, it must be said, just about steals the movie, too." Harrison's Reports wrote: "The Disney brand of cinemagic has been applied to a tested and true circus story and the result is a whimsical, delightful film for the youngsters and those adults who like their entertainment nostalgic and nonsensical." The Monthly Film Bulletin wrote that the story, though familiar, "should still give pleasure to children. On the other hand, there is little sense of the real circus; and not enough fantasy or natural child charm (Kevin Corcoran is merely efficient) to make up for this lack."

== Home media ==
The film was issued on DVD on August 2, 2005.
