= Alice Osborne Curwen =

American zoologist (c.1902–1983)

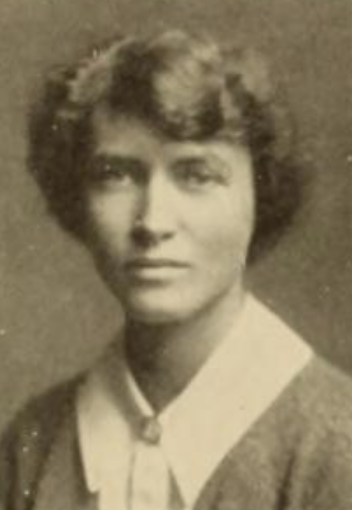
- Alice Osborne Curwen, from the 1925 yearbook of Smith College
- Born: c.1902 Philadelphia, Pennsylvania, United States
- Died: July 21, 1983 (aged 81 years); Newtown Square, Pennsylvania, United States
- Other name: Alice Osborne McKeen (married name)
- Occupations: Zoologist, college professor
- Spouse: Edward Forster McKeen (m. 1940; died 1970)

Alice Osborne Curwen (c.1902 – July 21, 1983) later Alice Osborn McKeen, was an American zoologist, medical college professor, and clubwoman. She taught anatomy, histology, and embryology classes at the Woman's Medical College of Pennsylvania.

== Early life and education ==
Alice Osborne Curwen was born in Philadelphia, the daughter of George Fisher Curwen and Helen Stoddard Osborne Curwen. Her father was a lumber dealer. She graduated from Smith College in 1925. She also studied embryology at the Marine Biological Laboratory in 1924. She completed doctoral studies in biology at Yale University, with a dissertation titled "The telencephalon of tupinambis nigropunctatus" (1937), a study of the brain anatomy of a Caribbean lizard.

== Career ==
Curwen continued her research on reptile anatomy in the 1930s, publishing research in the Journal of Comparative Neurology. She taught zoology at Smith College, and taught anatomy, histology, and embryology classes at the Woman's Medical College of Pennsylvania. She was a member of the American Association of Anatomists.

After marriage, she lived in Winterport, Maine, where she was president of the Winterport Club. In the 1940s and 1950s, she was a statewide lecturer and leader in Episcopal churchwomen's work in Maine, and represented Maine at a national Episcopalian conference in San Francisco in 1949. She was also active in the Women's Society of Christian Service, and a delegate to the state Republican convention in 1966.

== Personal life and legacy ==
Alice Osborne Curwen married Edward Forster McKeen in 1940. Her husband was superintendent at a coal plant in Maine. She and her sister Elinor Ewing Curwen donated art to the Philadelphia Museum of Art and the Pennsylvania Academy of the Fine Arts. Her husband died in 1970. In 1973, antiques worth thousands of dollars were stolen from her Maine home. She died in 1983, in Newtown Square, Pennsylvania, aged 81 years.

Though few in number, Curwen's publications continue to be cited in her field. As recently as 2005, she was included in a list of "illustrious" early comparative neuroanatomists, in an anatomy textbook.
