= The Story of a Bad Boy (novel) =

1870 book by Thomas Bailey Aldrich

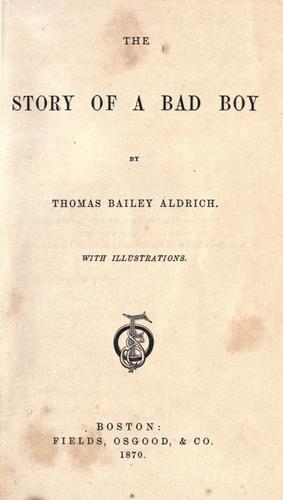
- Title page for The Story of a Bad Boy, 1870
- Author: Thomas Bailey Aldrich
- Language: English
- Published: 1870
- Publication place: USA

The Story of a Bad Boy (1870) is a semi-autobiographical novel by American writer Thomas Bailey Aldrich, fictionalizing his experiences as a boy in Portsmouth, New Hampshire. The book is considered the first in the "bad boy" genre of literature, though the text's opening lines admit that he was "not such a very bad, but a pretty bad boy".

== Plot summary ==
"Tom Bailey" is born in the fictitious town of Rivermouth, New Hampshire, but moves to New Orleans with his family when he is 18 months old. In his boyhood, his father wants him to be educated in the North and sent him back to Rivermouth to live with his grandfather, Captain Nutter. Nutter lives with his sister and an Irish servant. There, Tom becomes a member of a boys' club called the Centipedes. The boys become involved in a series of adventures. In one prank, the boys steal an old carriage and push it into a bonfire for the Fourth of July. During the winter, several boys build a snow fort on Slatter's Hill, inciting rival boys into a battle of snowballs. Later, Tom and three other boys combine their money to buy a boat named Dolphin and sneak away to an island. Tom also befriends a man nicknamed Sailor Ben, whom Tom originally meets on the ship that took him away from New Orleans. Revealed as the long-lost husband of Captain Nutter's Irish servant, Ben settles in Rivermouth in a boat-like cabin. Sailor Ben helps the boys fire off a series of old cannon at the pier, much to the confusion of the local townspeople. When his father's banking job fails, Tom is invited by an uncle to work in a counting-house in New York.

== Publication history ==
The Story of a Bad Boy was first published in 1869 by Ticknor and Fields in their juvenile magazine Our Young Folks. It was published in book form a year later by Boston: Fields, Osgood, & Co. It was republished in 1895 by Houghton, Mifflin and Company with illustrations by A. B. Frost.

== Analysis ==
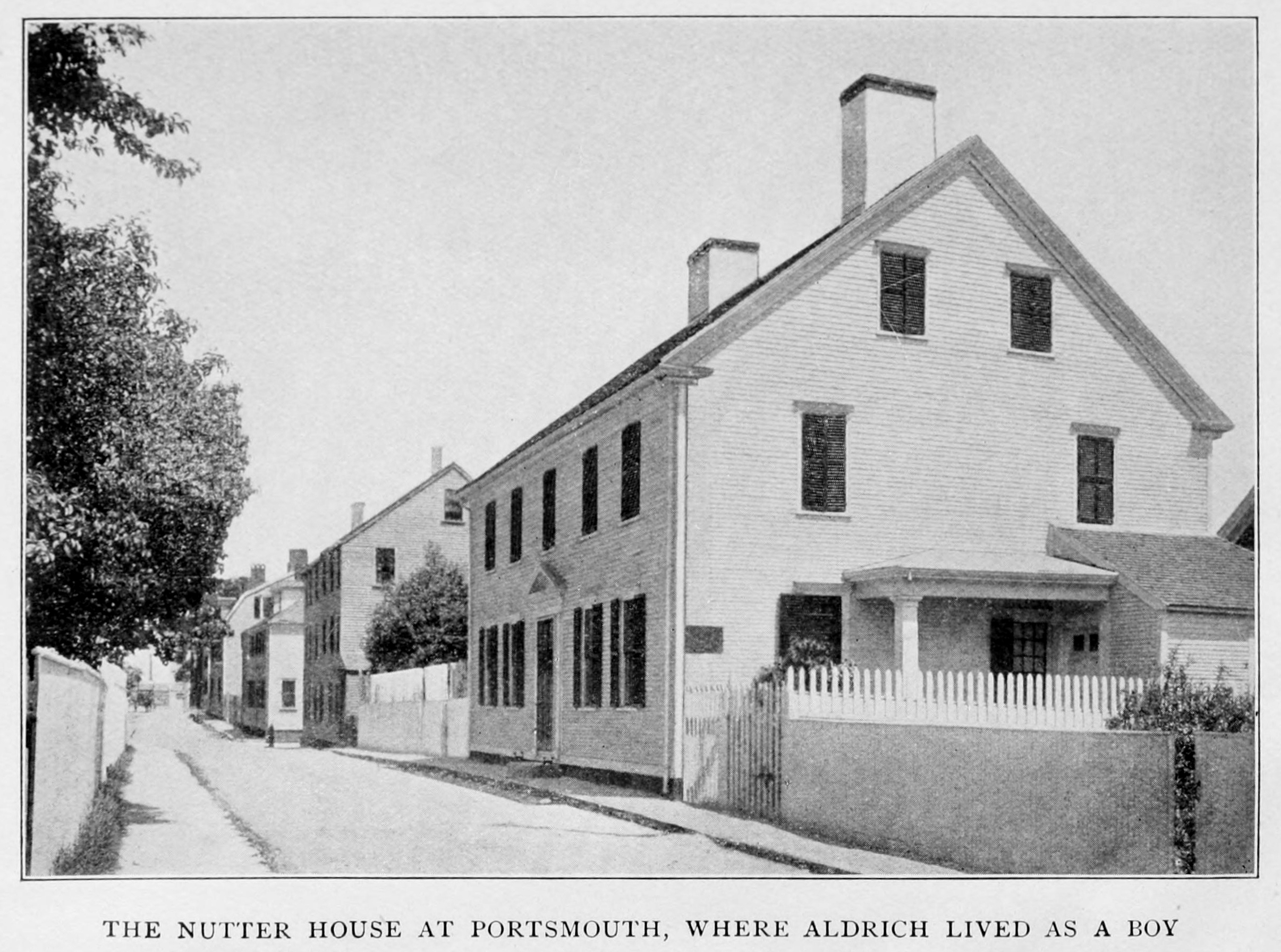
The Nutter House, which became the backdrop of The Story of a Bad Boy

The fictional town of Rivermouth is based on Portsmouth, New Hampshire. After Aldrich's death in 1907, the author's widow purchased the home where the book takes place and restored it to look as it did in 1850. It has been a house museum open to the public since 1909, now part of Strawbery Banke.

The book is considered the foundational text in a genre of "bad boy" literature which also includes Mark Twain's The Adventures of Tom Sawyer (1876), Charles Dudley Warner's Being a Boy (1877), William Dean Howells's A Boy's Town (1877), James Otis Kaler's Toby Tyler; or, Ten Weeks with a Circus (1877), Hamlin Garland's Boy Life on the Prairie (1899), and Booth Tarkington's Penrod (1913). A precursor was Horatio Alger, Jr.'s "Ragged Dick" series beginning in 1868, though scholar Kenneth B. Kidd says his works are generally excluded from the list. Aldrich also owed inspiration to the popular British book Tom Brown's School Days (1857) by Thomas Hughes. The bad boy genre, intended to be read by both children and adults, shows boys as irrational, primitive, and masculine.

Though the main character is relatively mild (something that Aldrich himself admits in the book's opening lines), The Story of a Bad Boy was the first to celebrate a misbehaving boy as protagonist rather than antagonist. Contemporary reviews hailed the book as a departure in traditional children's literature. The book was praised for showing the true life of a boy, rather than dictating what it ought to be. Ultimately, the story shows that a young troublemaker can grow up to become a successful adult. Though it has also been compared to the "girls book" genre initiated by Louisa May Alcott in Little Women, The Story of a Bad Boy does not have a single overarching narrative and is instead a series of sketches. Aldrich established the precedent that, generally, bad boy stories do not depict the characters' maturation to adulthood, though there is some evidence that they do grow up. In the case of The Story of a Bad Boy, Aldrich notes early in the book that the characters are now adults and serving as "lawyers, merchants, sea-captains, soldiers, authors, what not."

Twain, in particular, was heavily influenced by the book, though he was not originally impressed. He once wrote to his wife Livy, "I started to mark the Story of a Bad Boy, but for the life of me I could not admire the volume much." Scholar Andrew Levy suggests that Twain was downplaying his interest in the book and was driven to disdain it in private due to "a competitive pique". Literary scholar Marcus Klein has noted, however, that Twain later felt Aldrich to be the wittiest man in the past seven centuries.
