= Circus Days =

1923 film by Edward F. Cline, Harry Weil

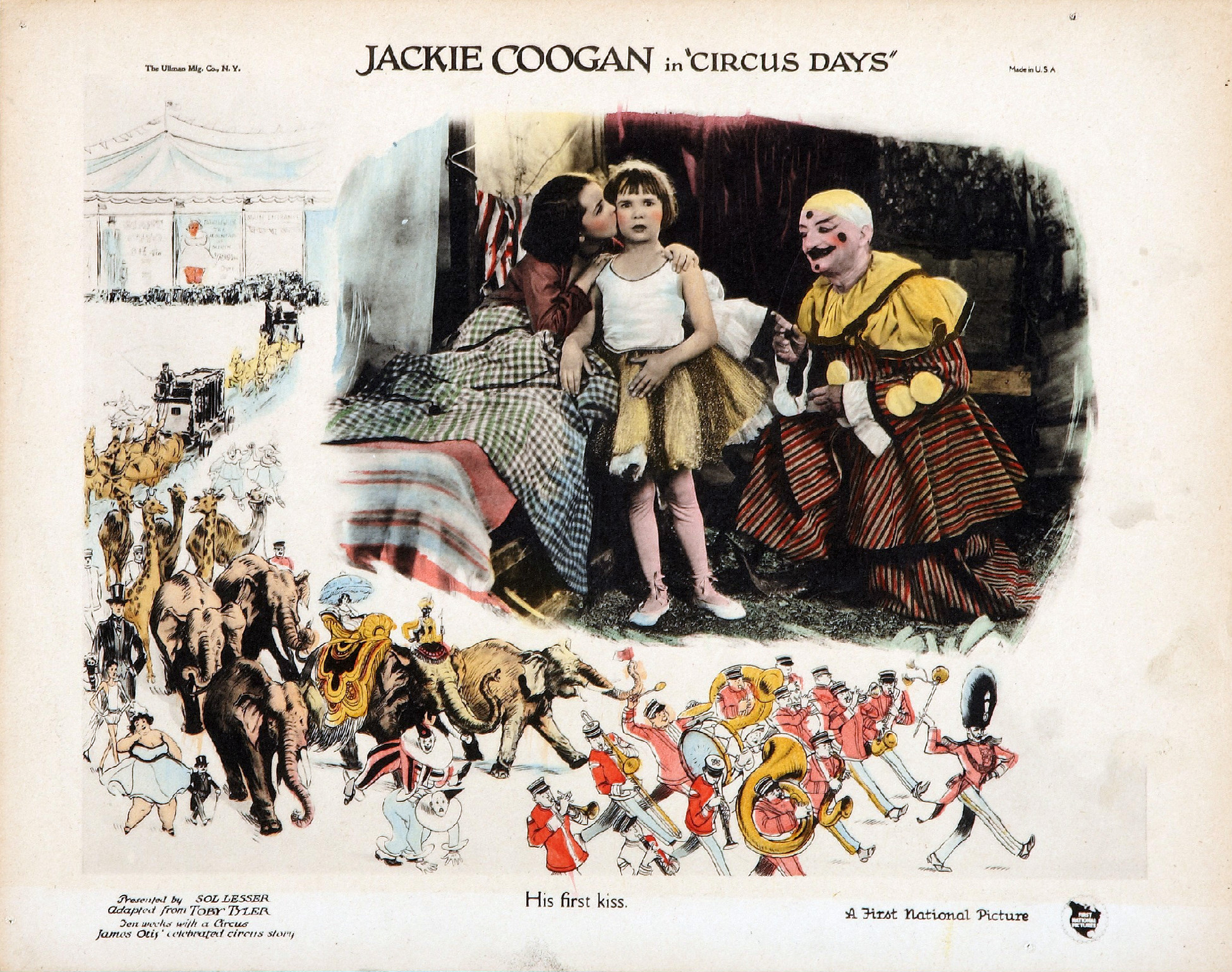
- Lobby card
- Directed by: Eddie Cline
- Written by: Eddie Cline (scenario); Harry Weil (scenario)
- Based on: Toby Tyler; or, Ten Weeks with a Circus by James Otis
- Produced by: Sol Lesser
- Starring: Jackie Coogan
- Cinematography: Frank Good; Robert Martin
- Edited by: Irene Morra
- Distributed by: Associated First National Pictures
- Release date: June 27, 1923
- Running time: 6 reels; 6,183 feet
- Country: United States
- Language: Silent with English intertitles

Circus Days is a 1923 American silent comedy film starring child actor Jackie Coogan, directed by Eddie Cline, produced by Sol Lesser and Jackie Coogan's own production company, and distributed through Associated First National Pictures. It is based on the 1877 novel Toby Tyler; or, Ten Weeks with a Circus by James Otis.

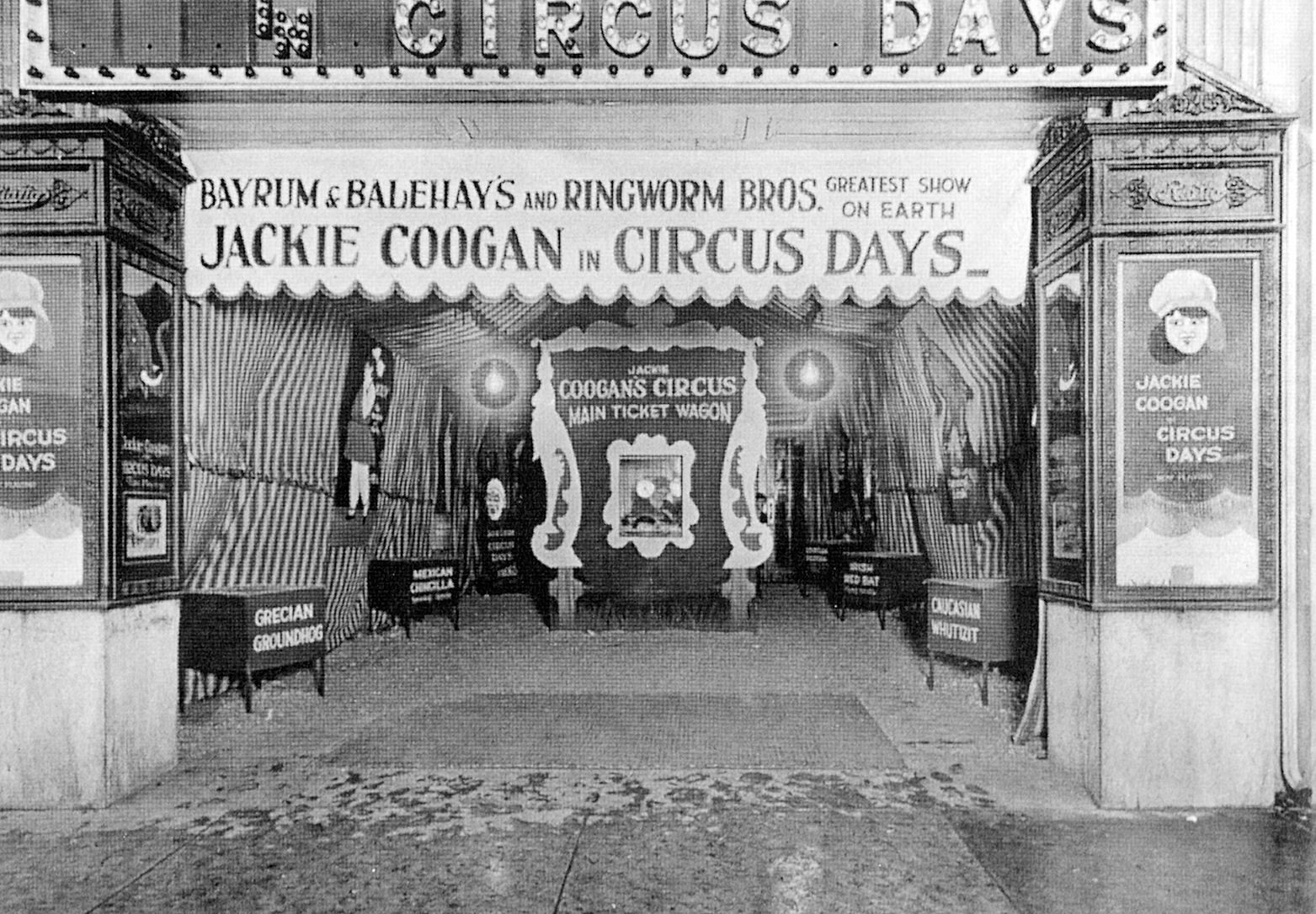
Circus Days being shown at a Pennsylvania theater

== Cast ==
- Jackie Coogan as Toby Tyler
- Barbara Tennant as Ann Tyler
- Russell Simpson as Eben Holt
- Claire McDowell as Martha
- Cesare Gravina as Luigi, the Clown
- Peaches Jackson as Jeannette
- Sam De Grasse as Lord the Concessionaire
- DeWitt Jennings as Daly
- Nellie Lane as Fat Woman
- William Barlow as Human Skeleton, 'World's Skinniest Man'

== Release ==
Circus Days premiered at Metropolitan Theater in Hermosa Beach on June 27, 1923. Cast members and producer Sol Lesser were in attendance.

== Preservation status ==
Circus Days had been considered a lost film, but a print survived in Russia. It was digitally presented to the Library of Congress from Russian archive Godmosfilm in 2010 along with several other lost silent films.
