= Winterport (CDP), Maine =

Winterport, Maine
- Census-designated place
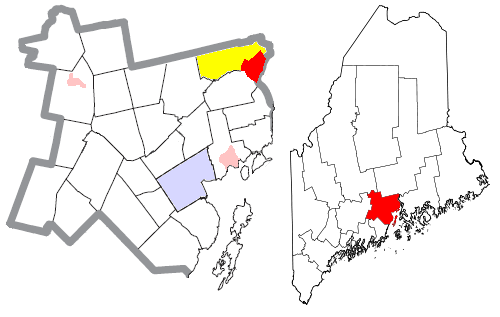
- Location of Winterport (in red) in Waldo County and the state of Maine
- Coordinates: 44°38′22″N 68°51′21″W
- Country: United States
- State: Maine
- County: Waldo

Area
  - Total: 6.55 sq mi (16.96 km^{2})
  - Land: 5.80 sq mi (15.01 km^{2})
  - Water: 0.75 sq mi (1.95 km^{2})
- Elevation: 171 ft (52 m)

Population (2020)
  - Total: 1,355
  - Density: 233.8/sq mi (90.26/km^{2})
- Time zone: UTC-5 (Eastern (EST))
  - Summer (DST): UTC-4 (EDT)
- ZIP code: 04496
- Area code: 207
- GNIS feature ID: 2377969

Winterport is a census-designated place (CDP) in the town of Winterport in Waldo County, Maine, United States. The population was 1,307 at the 2000 census.

== Geography ==
According to the United States Census Bureau, the CDP has a total area of 6.6 mi^{2} (17.0 km^{2}), of which 5.8 mi^{2} (15.0 km^{2}) is land and 0.8 mi^{2} (1.9 km^{2}) (11.45%) is water.

Winterport lies in the northeastern corner of Waldo County, along the Penobscot River across from Hancock County. It is located in the southeastern corner of the town, along the border with Frankfort to the south and Bucksport to the east. Within the central village of the CDP are community locations such as Wagner Middle School, Abbott Park, and the town offices. U.S. Route 1 is Winterport's main street.

The Winterport Historic District, encompassing a significant portion of the town center, was listed on the National Register of Historic Places in 1975.

== Demographics ==
Historical population
Census	Pop.	Note	%±
2020	1,355		—
U.S. Decennial Census

As of the census of 2000, there were 1,307 people, 547 households, and 383 families residing in the CDP. The population density was 225.5 inhabitants per square mile (87.1/km^{2}). There were 579 housing units at an average density of 99.9/sq mi (38.5/km^{2}). The racial makeup of the CDP was 98.09% White, 0.31% Black or African American, 0.54% Native American, 0.31% Asian, 0.08% Pacific Islander, 0.31% from other races, and 0.38% from two or more races. Hispanic or Latino of any race were 0.46% of the population.

There were 547 households, out of which 30.5% had children under the age of 18 living with them, 55.0% were married couples living together, 11.2% had a female householder with no husband present, and 29.8% were non-families. 23.0% of all households were made up of individuals, and 7.7% had someone living alone who was 65 years of age or older. The average household size was 2.39 and the average family size was 2.80.

In the CDP, the population was spread out, with 23.7% under the age of 18, 8.2% from 18 to 24, 28.8% from 25 to 44, 26.6% from 45 to 64, and 12.7% who were 65 years of age or older. The median age was 39 years. For every 100 females, there were 92.5 males. For every 100 females age 18 and over, there were 85.7 males.

The median income for a household in the CDP was $35,000, and the median income for a family was $47,981. Males had a median income of $29,231 versus $24,934 for females. The per capita income for the CDP was $17,372. About 17.6% of families and 22.2% of the population were below the poverty line, including 41.6% of those under age 18 and 16.3% of those age 65 or over.
