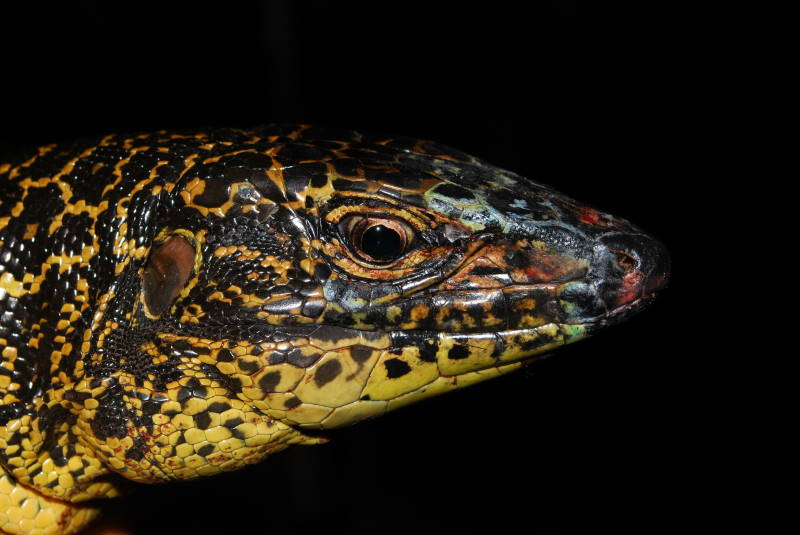

Conservation status
- CITES Appendix II

Scientific classification
- Kingdom: Animalia
- Phylum: Chordata
- Class: Reptilia
- Order: Squamata
- Family: Teiidae
- Genus: Tupinambis
- Species: T. teguixin

Binomial name
- Tupinambis teguixin (Linnaeus, 1758)
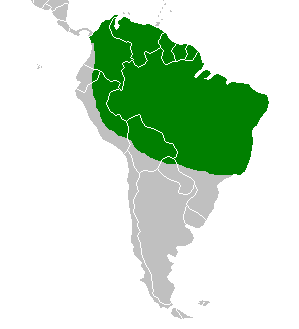

Synonyms
- Teius teguexim (Linnaeus, 1758); Tupinambis nigropunctatus (Spix, 1825) Lacerta teguexim (Linnaeus, 1758)

= Gold tegu =

Species of lizard

The gold tegu (Tupinambis teguixin), also known as the golden tegu, common tegu, black tegu, Colombian black and white tegu and tiger lizard or "matte" (in Trinidad), is a species of tegu.

== Taxonomy ==
Its old scientific name (synonym) was Tupinambis nigropunctatus, but it has since renamed to Tupinambis teguixin.

== Description ==
Gold tegus grow to be about 2 to 3 ft (60 to 100 cm) long on average, and up to 3.5 to 4.0 kg in weight, with a glossy body, powerful limbs and a thick tail. They have many black and gold stripes down their bodies.

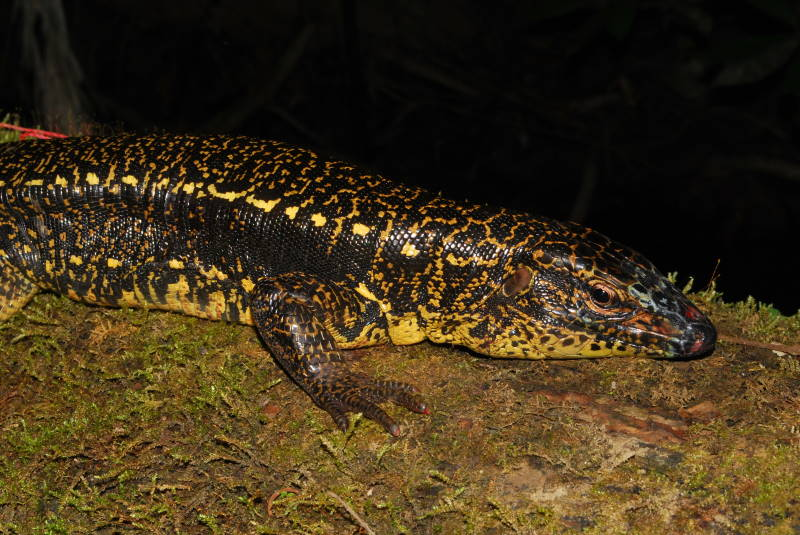
In Ecuador

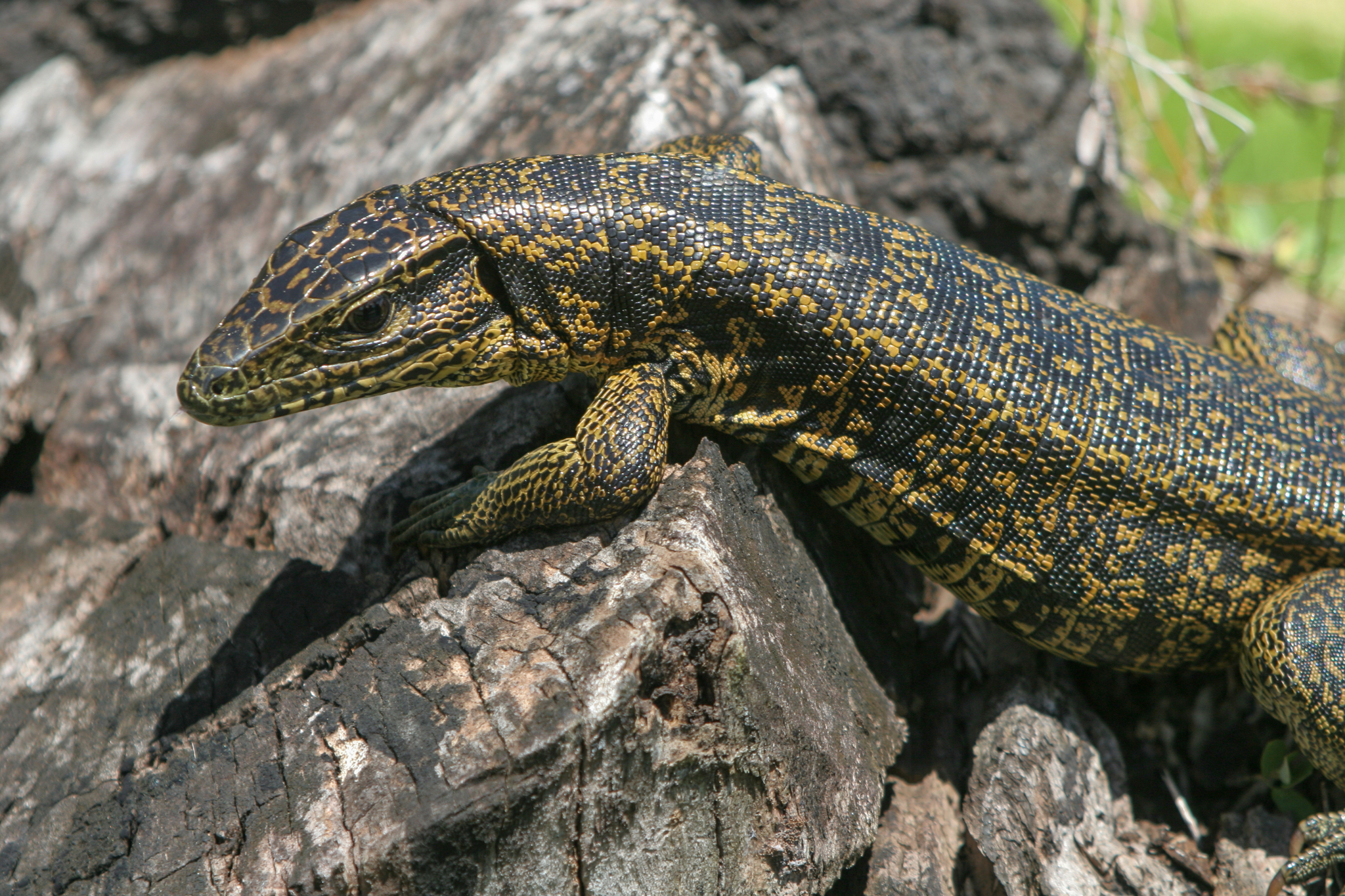
In French Guiana

== Distribution ==
Gold tegus live in the tropical forests of northern and central South America, as well as in Panama. Its South American range extends to the island of Trinidad.

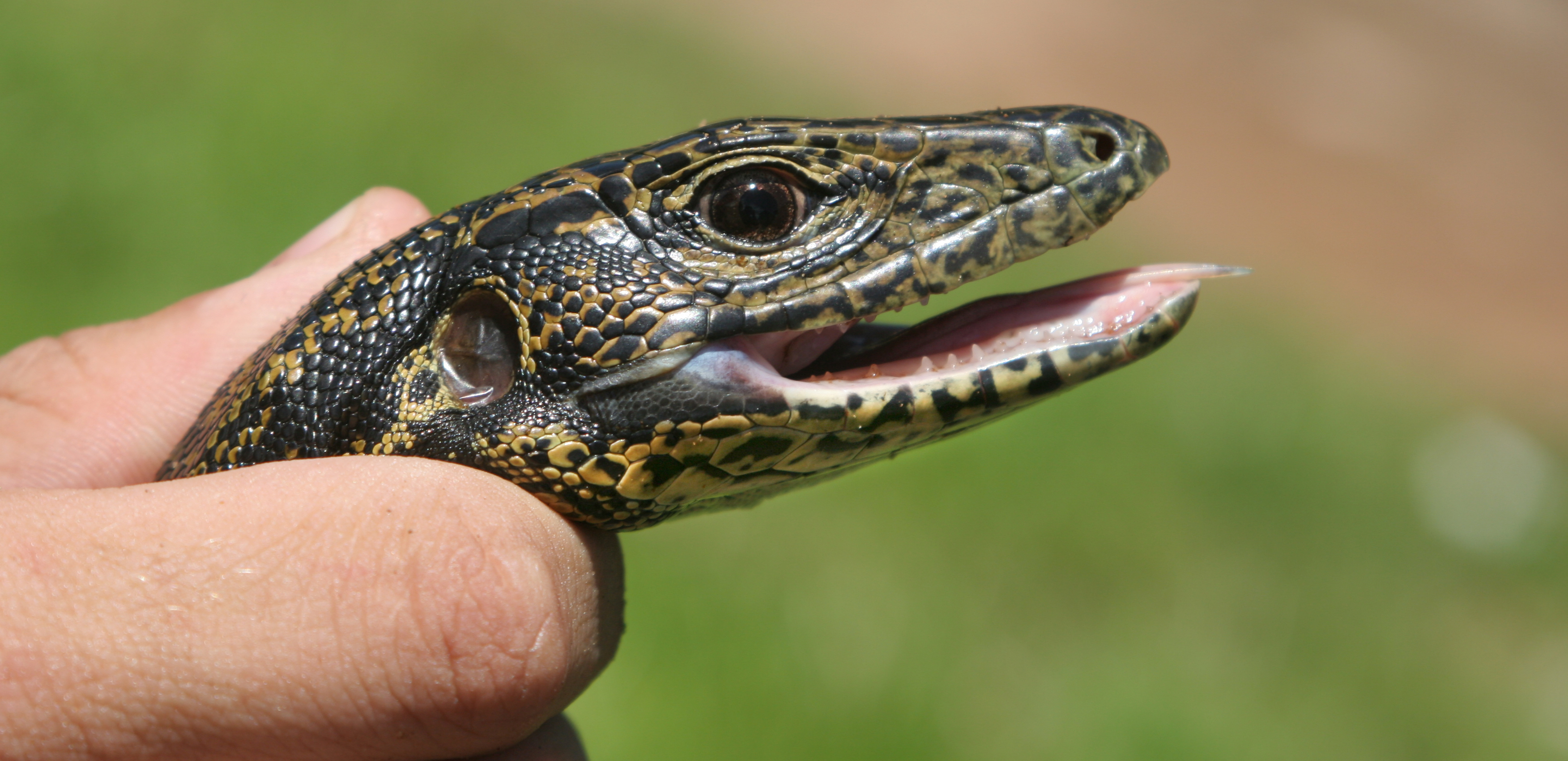
Showing teeth

== Diet ==
They feed on insects, other invertebrates (such as snails), small mammals, other reptiles (such as smaller lizards and small snakes), birds, and fish; it takes nest eggs of birds, turtles, and caimans. It sometimes eats fruit and honey.

== As pets ==
They typically do not make as good a pet as their larger southern relatives, the Argentine black and white tegu and the red tegu; however, if handled frequently, they can make a good pet.

== Bibliography ==
- Bartlett, R.D.; Bartlett, P. (2003). Reptiles and Amphibians of the Amazon: An ecotourist's guide. University Press of Florida. ISBN 9780813026237.
- Curwen, A.O. (April 1937). "The telencephalon of tupinambis nigropunctatus". Journal of Comparative Neurology. 66 (2): 375–404. doi:10.1002/cne.900660208.
