= James Kaler =

James Kaler may refer to:

- James Otis Kaler (1848–1912), American journalist and author of children's literature
- James B. Kaler (born 1938), American astronomer and science writer
