= Albert E. Fernald =

Medal of Honor recipient

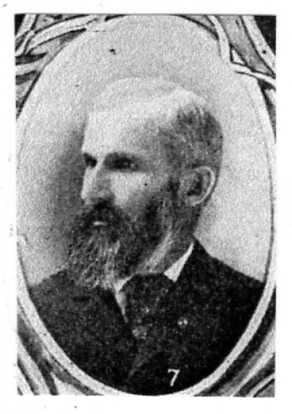
- Medal of Honor winner Albert E. Fernald
- Born: May 13, 1838; Winterport, Maine
- Died: December 3, 1908 (aged 70); Winterport, Maine
- Burial place: Oak Hill Cemetery
- Military career
- Allegiance: United States of America
- Branch: United States Army
- Rank: First Lieutenant
- Units: Company F, 20th Maine Volunteer Infantry Regiment
- Conflicts: Battle of Five Forks
- Awards: Medal of Honor

Albert E. Fernald (May 13, 1838 – December 3, 1908) was an American soldier who fought in the American Civil War. Fernald received the United States' highest award for bravery during combat, the Medal of Honor, for his action during the Battle of Five Forks in Virginia on April 1, 1865. He was honored with the award on May 10, 1865.

== Biography ==
Fernald was born in Winterport, Maine, on May 13, 1838. He enlisted into the 20th Maine Infantry. He died on December 3, 1908, and his remains are interred at Oak Hill Cemetery in Maine.

== Medal of Honor citation ==
The President of the United States of America, in the name of Congress, takes pleasure in presenting the Medal of Honor to First Lieutenant (Infantry) Albert E. Fernald, United States Army, for extraordinary heroism on 1 April 1865, while serving with Company F, 20th Maine Infantry, in action at Five Forks, Virginia. During a rush at the enemy, Lieutenant Fernald seized, during a scuffle, the flag of the 9th Virginia Infantry (Confederate States of America).

== See also ==
- List of American Civil War Medal of Honor recipients: A–F
