= Marjorie Daw (short story) =

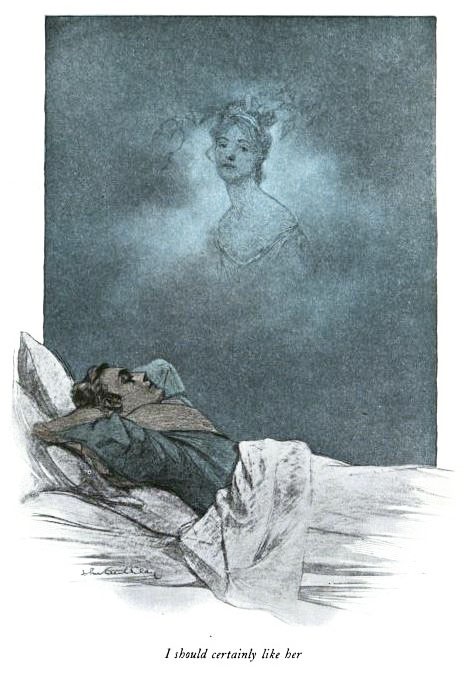
John Flemming (Jack) imagines Marjorie Daw in an illustration by John Cecil Clay, 1908

"Marjorie Daw" is an epistolary short story (consisting of transcripts of fictional letters) by Thomas Bailey Aldrich. One of Aldrich's first short stories, it was first published in 1869 and was later included in the book collection Marjorie Daw and Other People (1873).

The story centers around an increasingly agitated correspondence between two young men, Jack and Edward. Edward invents a charming young woman neighbor, Marjorie Daw, and in what is intended at first as a harmless diversion, fills his letters to Jack with anecdotes about the beautiful, charming, and accomplished Miss Daw, and her oppression by her overbearing father. On reading these accounts, his friend Jack becomes madly smitten with Marjorie, and finally vows to come and intervene. At this point Edward is forced to admit his ruse, and the story ends with Edward writing "For oh, dear Jack, there isn't any piazza, there isn't any hammock - there isn't any Marjorie Daw!"

== Anthologies containing Majorie Daw ==
- Marjorie Daw and Other People (1873)
- Marjorie Daw and Other Stories, Thomas Bailey Aldrich, 1886, Houghton Mifflin, Riverside Aldine Series
- The Best American Humorous Short Stories, Alexander Jessup (ed.), 1920, Boni & Liveright
- Family Book of Best Loved Short Stories, Leleand W. Lawrence (ed.), 1954, Hanover House
- Great American Short Stories, Volume 2, audiobook, 2008, BiblioLife, ISBN 978-0-554-31117-3
- Short Story Classics: The Best from the Masters of the Genre
