= The Boy Spies of Philadelphia =

The Boy Spies of Philadelphia is a children's novel originally published in 1897 under the title With Washington at Monmouth. It is one of a series of "Boy Spies" novels dating to the 1890s and early 1900s written by James Otis Kaler (writing as James Otis) and William P. Chipman.

The Boy Spies of Philadelphia tells the story of a group of boy spies who helped the Continental Army at Valley Forge.

== Plot ==
The Boy Spies of Philadelphia begins with three friends, all around 16 years old: Jacob Ludwick, Seth Graydon and Enoch Ball. Jacob and Seth joined the Continental Army in 1777. Enoch is not really enrolled because his mother would not let him join, yet he helps Jacob and Seth on some of their missions, including as spies to help Washington at Valley Forge. The boys’ first mission is to gather information in the heart of the British camp, despite having little skill in spying.

Enoch is later summoned to join the army and given a solo task to deliver the message that George Washington has moved from Valley Forge to General Dickinson, who has been attempting to harass the enemy during his march. At camp, the boys then set off on another mission: to learn which direction General Clinton proposes to march from the town near Mount Holly, a town in New Jersey. They are to return to the camp within 48 hours, even if unsuccessful in gathering any information. On the way to the town, the boys rest at a mysterious man's house; they get trapped inside as prisoners of a Tory, enemies to the Whig party. When they escape, they head back to camp due to their injuries. They continue to help the Continentalists and take part in the Battle of Monmouth as spies for General Washington.
