= Winterport Congregational Church =

Historic church in Maine, United States

- U.S. National Register of Historic Places
- U.S. Historic district – Contributing property
- Location within Maine Location within the United States
- Location: 177 Main St., Winterport, Maine
- Coordinates: 44°38′9″N 68°50′49″W
- Area: 1 acre (0.40 ha)
- Built: 1831
- Architect: Calvin Ryder
- Architectural style: Gothic Revival
- Part of: Winterport Historic District (ID75000112)
- NRHP reference No.: 73000151

Significant dates
- Added to NRHP: April 24, 1973
- Designated CP: October 3, 1975

Winterport Congregational Church, originally and once again the Winterport Union Meeting House, is a historic church at 177 Main Street (U.S. Route 1A) in Winterport, Maine. Built in 1831, it is a prominent little-altered example of Gothic Revival architecture, designed and built by Calvin Ryder, a well-known regional architect and builder. It was listed on the National Register of Historic Places in 1973.

== Description and history ==
The Winterport Congregational Church is located in Winterport's village center, on the west side of Main Street just south of its junction with Elm Street. It is set well back from the street (its parking area is located off Elm Street), with a tree-lined series of stepped terraces giving it a somewhat monumental setting. The building is a modest rectangular single-story wood frame structure, with a gabled roof and granite foundation. The front facade is finished in flushboarding, while the other sides are finished in wooden clapboards. The building corners have pilasters with lancet-arched panels. The front facade has a central Gothic lancet-arched window, flanked by entrances with similar lancet-arch features. A tower rises above the roof gable, with a square base topped by a second section that houses a clock and belfry. Above this rises an octagonal steeple, with pinnaces at the corners of its base.

In 1820, five different religious congregations united to organize construction of a church building in Winterport. This building was completed in 1831 as the culmination of this effort. It was designed and built by Calvin Ryder, a prominent local builder and designer. Due to squabbling between the denominations, the building was soon given over to the Congregationalists. The clock was added in 1860, and the interior underwent remodeling at that time. The church has seen only minor changes and repairs since then. Since 1976 it has been owned and maintained by a local non-profit organization.

== See also ==
- National Register of Historic Places listings in Waldo County, Maine
