= Richard Eastham =

American actor

- Eastman in Tombstone Territory, 1957
- Born: Dickinson Swift Eastham; June 22, 1916; Opelousas, Louisiana, U.S.
- Died: July 10, 2005 (aged 89); Pacific Palisades, California, U.S.
- Occupation: Actor
- Years active: 1954–1991
- Spouse: Betty Jean Eastham (m. 1942; died 2002)

Richard Eastham (born Dickinson Swift Eastham; June 22, 1916 – July 10, 2005) was an American actor of stage, film, and television, a concert singer known for his deep baritone voice, and an inventor.

== Early years ==
Eastham's birth name was chosen in honor of Miss Helen Dickinson Swift, one of his mother's college classmates. He is the son of Mr. and Mrs. Ernest K. Eastham, and he attended Soldan High School. Prior to serving in the Army during World War II, he was a student at Washington University in St. Louis, where he sang with the St. Louis Grand Opera.

== Career ==
On Broadway, Eastham was the understudy for Ezio Pinza as "Emile DeBecque" in South Pacific, eventually replacing Pinza on stage. His performance was so well received that he was made the male lead for a two-year national tour of the musical. His other Broadway plays included Medea and Call Me Madam. Eastham and co-star Janet Blair, in their original roles, headed another tour of South Pacific in 1965. In 1981 he appeared as Wesley Northridge on The Waltons “The Lumberjack” (TV Episode 1981)

Prompted by his playing of a guitar in The Sound of Music, Eastham invented the "Sidewinder", a mechanical device that attaches to the tuning gears and assists restringing a guitar. 31,000 "Sidewinders" were sold in the first three weeks they were publicly available.

== Personal life and death ==
Eastham married Betty Jean Van Allen, who was his high school classmate. On July 10, 2005, he died of Alzheimer's disease at an assisted-living facility in Pacific Palisades. He was cremated after his nephews and nieces had a private funeral service for him. His ashes were entombed inside a columbarium at Oak Grove Cemetery in St. Louis, Missouri.

== Filmography ==
Film
Year	Title	Role	Notes
1954	There's No Business Like Show Business	Lew Harris	Film
1957	Man on Fire	Bryan Seward	Film
1960	Toby Tyler; or, Ten Weeks with a Circus	Colonel Sam Castle	Film
1965	That Darn Cat!	Supervisor Newton	Film
1966	Not with My Wife, You Don't!	General Milt Walters	Film
1966	Murderers' Row	Dr. Norman Solaris	Film
1969	Silent Night, Lonely Night	Paul Johnson	TV movie
1969	The Last of the Powerseekers	Anthony Mathesson III	TV movie
1973	Tom Sawyer	Doctor P.R. Robinson	Film
1973	Battle for the Planet of the Apes	Mutant Captain	Film
1974	The President's Plane is Missing	General Colton	TV movie
1974	McQ	Walter Forrester	Film
1974	The Missiles of October	Gen. David M. Shoup - USMC Commandant	TV movie
1975	Attack on Terror: The FBI vs. the Ku Klux Klan	Investigator	TV movie
1975	Doubletalk	Father	Short
1976	Mallory: Circumstantial Evidence	Executive	TV movie
1980	Conquest of the Earth	Gen. Cushing	Film
1982	A Wedding on Walton's Mountain	Mr. Northridge	TV movie
Television
Year	Title	Role	Notes
1955	Max Liebman Spectaculars	Grandfather	Heidi
1957	Men of Annapolis	Coach Uehling / Instructor Damon	2 episodes
1957-1960	Tombstone Territory	Harris Claibourne / Editor of the Tombstone Epitaph and also the show's Narrator	91 episodes
1960	Zane Grey Theatre	Jim Amber	Never Too Late
1960	The Aquanauts	Sinclair	Disaster Below
1961	Bat Masterson	Orin Dilts	A Lesson in Violence
1961	The Barbara Stanwyck Show	Sam Verner	Along the Barbary Coast
1961	King of Diamonds	Trumik	The Couriers
1962	Ensign O'Toole	Chief Petty Officer O'Toole	Operation Potomac
1962	Ripcord	Don Hart	Hostage Below
1963	Alcoa Premiere	Will Stark	The Town That Died
1961-1965	Perry Mason	Oliver Stone / Roland Canfield / Prosecutor Parness/ Deputy D.A. Parness	4 episodes
1967	The Invaders	Carl Vanders	Summit Meeting: Part II
1967	Cowboy in Africa	Whitaker	The Hesitant Hero
1969	The Bill Cosby Show	Lionel Schallert	Lullaby and Goodnight
1969	The Survivors	Himself	Chapter One
1969-1970	Bright Promise	Red Wilson	15 episodes
1970	Mod Squad	Harrison Cochran	A Time for Remembering
1970	Adam-12	Mr. Courtnay	Log 173: Shoplift
1970	The Young Lawyers	Torrance	Where's Aaron
1968-1971	The F.B.I	Special Agent Howard Armstrong	2 episodes
1972	Cade's County	Rafaelson	Shakedown
1972	Cannon	Lucas Whipple	The Shadow Man
1967-1973	Bonanza	Tom Yardley / Stanton	2 episodes
1971-1974	Owen Marshall, Counselor at Law	Prof. Gannett / Philip Lerman	2 episodes
1972-1974	The Streets of San Francisco	Jack Leist / Jules Rhinelander	2 episodes
1974	Toma	Dr. Herman	50% of Normal
1974	Kojak	Jack Seymour	A Killing in the Second House
1975	McMillan & Wife	Thomas Ewing	Deadly Inheritance
1976	Rich Man, Poor Man	Sen. Mickelwaite	Part III: Chapter 5
1976	Baretta	Linton Gavin	Runaway Cowboy
1976-1977	Wonder Woman	General Phil Blankenship	13 episodes
1978	Grandpa Goes to Washington	Unknown	Pilot
1975-1979	Barnaby Jones	Lawrence Adams / R.B. Catlin	3 episodes
1979	Salvage 1	Brinks / Commentator	6 episodes
1980	Galactica 1980	General Cushing	Galactica Discovers Earth: Part 1
1980	Condominium	Tom Forrester	2 episodes
1977-1981	The Waltons	Wesley Northridge / Judge Thomas Parrish	2 episodes
1979-1982	Quincy M.E.	Drug Industry Council Member / Baine / Chemical Company Executive	3 episodes
1982	Tales of the Gold Monkey	Dr. White	Trunk from the Past
1982	Falcon Crest	Dr. Howell	6 episodes
1982	Hart to Hart	Man at Restaurant	One Hart Too Many
1991	Dallas	Frank Hillson	2 episodes
