= Toby Tyler; or, Ten Weeks with a Circus =

Book by James Otis Kaler

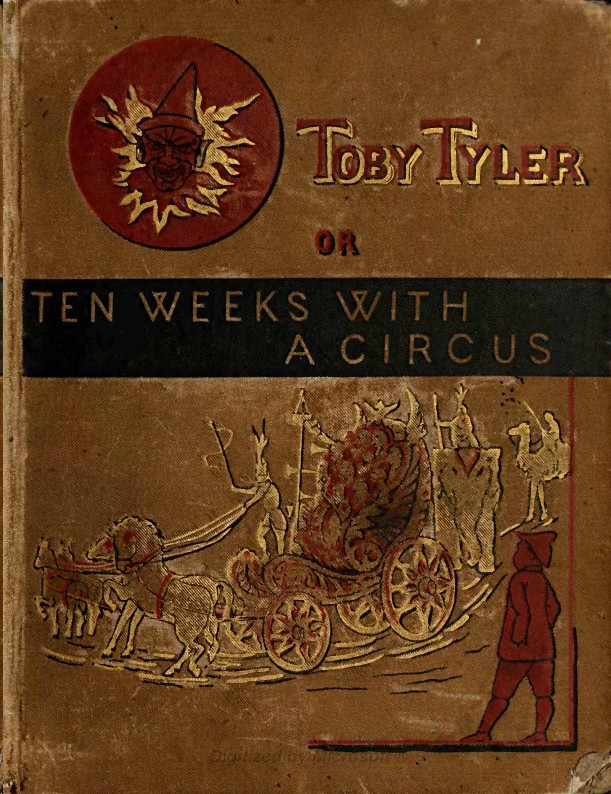
Toby Tyler, first edition, cover. New York: Harper & Brothers, 1881.

Toby Tyler; or, Ten Weeks with a Circus is a children's novel by "James Otis", the pen name of James Otis Kaler.

== Summary ==
Toby Tyler tells the story of a ten-year-old orphan who runs away from his uncle's home to join the traveling circus, only to discover his new employer is a cruel taskmaster. The book depicts the difference between the romance of the circus from the outside and the reality as seen from the inside. Toby's friend, Mr. Stubbs the “venerable monkey”, (most likely a capuchin, not a chimpanzee as used in the movie), reinforces the consequences of what happens when one follows one's natural instincts rather than one's intellect and conscience, a central theme of the novel.

== Publication history ==
Toby Tyler was initially serialized in Harper's Young People in 1877, then published as a book in 1881. It became something of a classic among American children who dreamed of running away to join the circus and remained popular for generations. It was Kaler's first book, and also his best known and most successful.

The original book contains 30 pen and ink drawings by W. A. Rogers (1854-1931).

A sequel, Mr. Stubb's Brother, was published in 1883.

In 1923 it was made into a silent film by Eddie Cline, Circus Days, as a vehicle for child star Jackie Coogan. Disney also made a film version, Toby Tyler, starring Kevin Corcoran in 1960.

== Analysis ==
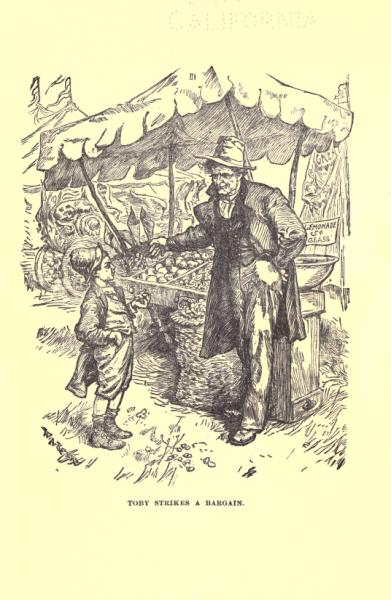
"Toby strikes a bargain", page 11, by W. A. Rogers (1881)

Toby Tyler is a "bad boy" novel, meant to teach a lesson about what happens to boys who do bad things; other examples include George W. Peck's Peck's Bad Boy (1883), Thomas Bailey Aldrich's The Story of a Bad Boy (1870), and Mark Twain's Adventures of Tom Sawyer (1876). As with Mark Twain's Adventures of Huckleberry Finn (1884), also about a conscience-stricken escaped and wandering orphan boy (written following the success of Toby Tyler), most readers do not remember Toby Tyler for its wholesome message, but as a romantic story of running away to the circus and adventures on the road.

The book was influential with some famous "bad boys". A young Carl Sandburg thought Toby Tyler was one of his favorite books (even better than Adventures of Huckleberry Finn). Harlan Ellison credits it as influencing his decision to run off with the circus. William S. Burroughs wrote of it in his journals.
