= Thomas Bailey Aldrich =

American poet

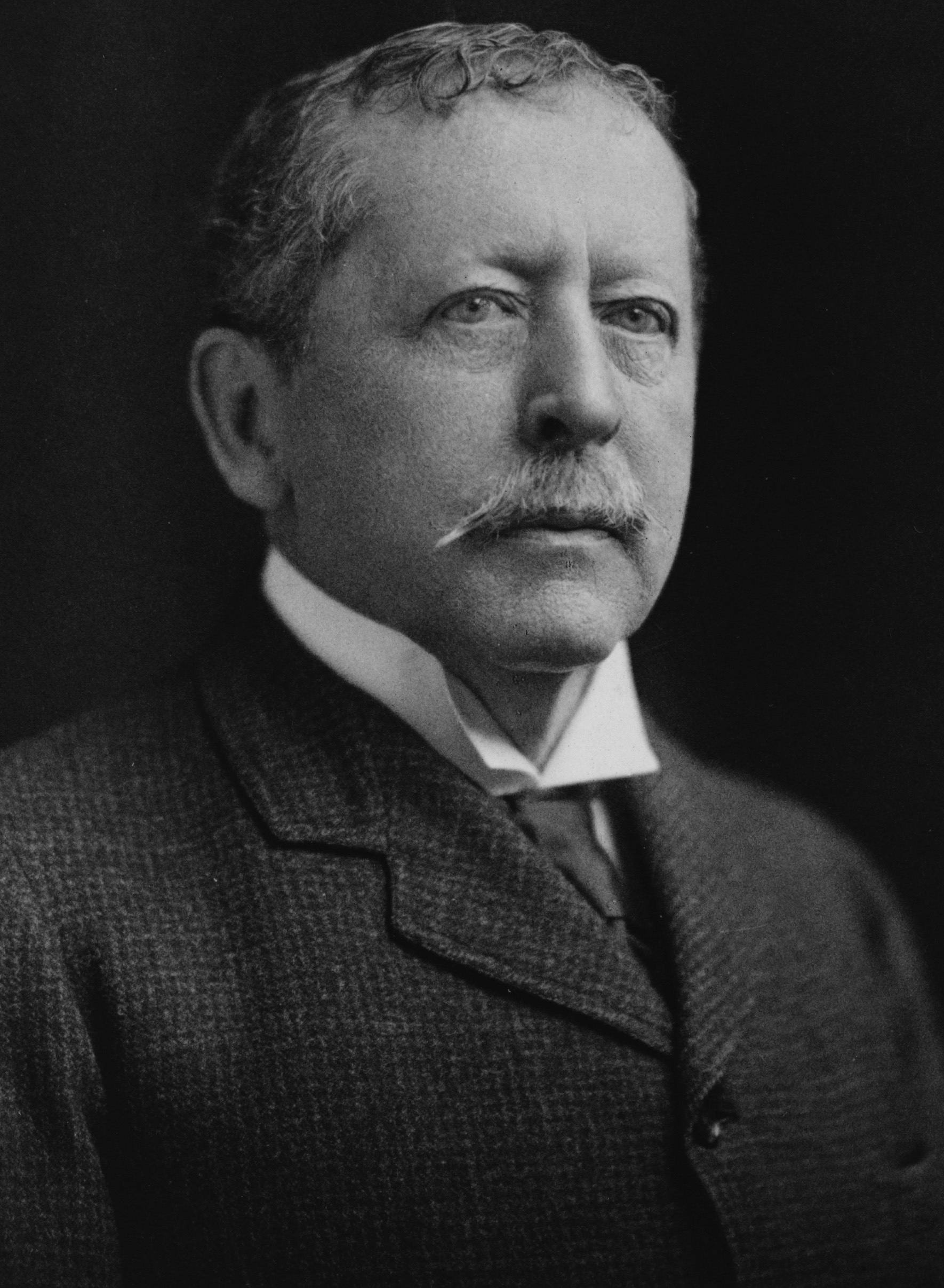
- Born: November 11, 1836; Portsmouth, New Hampshire, United States
- Died: March 19, 1907 (aged 70); Boston, Massachusetts, United States
- Occupations: Poet; novelist; editor

Thomas Bailey Aldrich (/ˈɔːldrɪtʃ/ AWL-dritch; November 11, 1836 – March 19, 1907) was an American writer, poet, critic, and editor. He is notable for his long editorship of The Atlantic Monthly, during which he published writers including Charles W. Chesnutt. He was also known for his semi-autobiographical book The Story of a Bad Boy, which established the "bad boy's book" subgenre in nineteenth-century American literature, and for his poetry.

== Biography ==
=== Early life and education ===
Thomas Bailey Aldrich was born in Portsmouth, New Hampshire, on November 11, 1836, to Elias T. Aldrich and Sara Aldrich, née Bailey. When Aldrich was a child, his father moved to New Orleans, but after 10 years, Aldrich was sent back to Portsmouth to prepare for college. This period of his life is partly described in his semi-autobiographical novel The Story of a Bad Boy (1870), in which "Tom Bailey" is the juvenile hero.

=== Early career ===
Aldrich abandoned college preparations after his father's death in 1849. At age 16 in 1852, he entered his uncle's New York business office and became a constant contributor to the newspapers and magazines. Aldrich befriended other young poets, artists and wits of the metropolitan bohemia of the early 1860s, including Edmund Clarence Stedman, Richard Henry Stoddard, Fitz Hugh Ludlow, Bayard Taylor and Walt Whitman. From 1856 to 1859, Aldrich was on the staff of the Home Journal, then edited by Nathaniel Parker Willis. During the Civil War he was the editor of the New York Illustrated News.

Daguerreotype of Thomas Bailey Aldrich, MS Am 1287.7, Houghton Library, Harvard University

In 1865, Aldrich returned to New England, and in Boston he edited the eclectic weekly literary magazine Every Saturday, published by Ticknor and Fields and successors (Field, Osgood; James R. Osgood & Co.; H. O. Houghton & Co.), throughout its run from 1866 to 1874. From 1881 to 1890, he edited The Atlantic Monthly, Boston's most important magazine. As editor of The Atlantic he created tension with his publisher Henry Oscar Houghton by refusing to publish articles that Houghton commissioned from friends including Woodrow Wilson and Francis Marion Crawford. When Houghton chastised Aldrich for turning down submissions from his friend Daniel Coit Gilman, Aldrich threatened to resign and finally did so in June 1890.

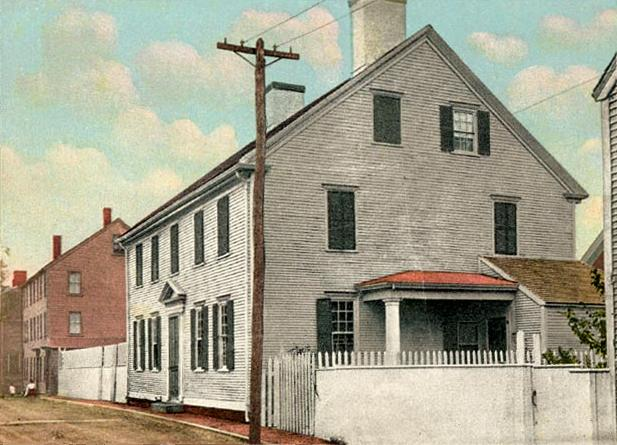
Thomas Bailey Aldrich House, part of Strawbery Banke Museum, Portsmouth, New Hampshire

Beginning with the collection of stories entitled Marjorie Daw and Other People (1873), Aldrich wrote works of realism and quiet humor. His novels Prudence Palfrey (1874), The Queen of Sheba (1877), and The Stillwater Tragedy (1880) had more dramatic action. The first portrayed Portsmouth with the affectionate touch shown in the shorter humorous tale, A Rivermouth Romance (1877). In An Old Town by the Sea (1893), Aldrich commemorated his birthplace again. Travel and description are the theme of From Ponkapog to Pesth (1883).

=== Marriage and later life ===
Aldrich was married in 1865 to Lilian Woodman of New York, and had two sons. Mark Twain apparently detested Aldrich's wife, writing in 1893: "Lord, I loathe that woman so! She is an idiot—an absolute idiot—and does not know it ... and her husband, the sincerest man that walks ... tied for life to this vacant hellion, this clothes-rack, this twaddling, blethering, driveling blatherskite!" For her own part, Lilian Aldrich wrote affectionately of Mark Twain in her memoir Crowding Memories (1920). In Chapter 12, however, she does write apologetically about their first encounter, when she treated him coldly, not being informed of his identity and mistakenly believing him to be inebriated.

The Aldriches were close friends of Henry L. Pierce, former mayor of Boston and chocolate magnate. At his death in 1896, he willed them his estate at Canton, Massachusetts.

In 1901, Aldrich's son Charles, married the year before, was diagnosed with tuberculosis. Aldrich built two houses, one for his son and one for him and his family, in Saranac Lake, New York, then the leading treatment center for the disease. On March 6, 1904, Charles Aldrich died of tuberculosis, age thirty-four. The family left Saranac Lake and never returned.

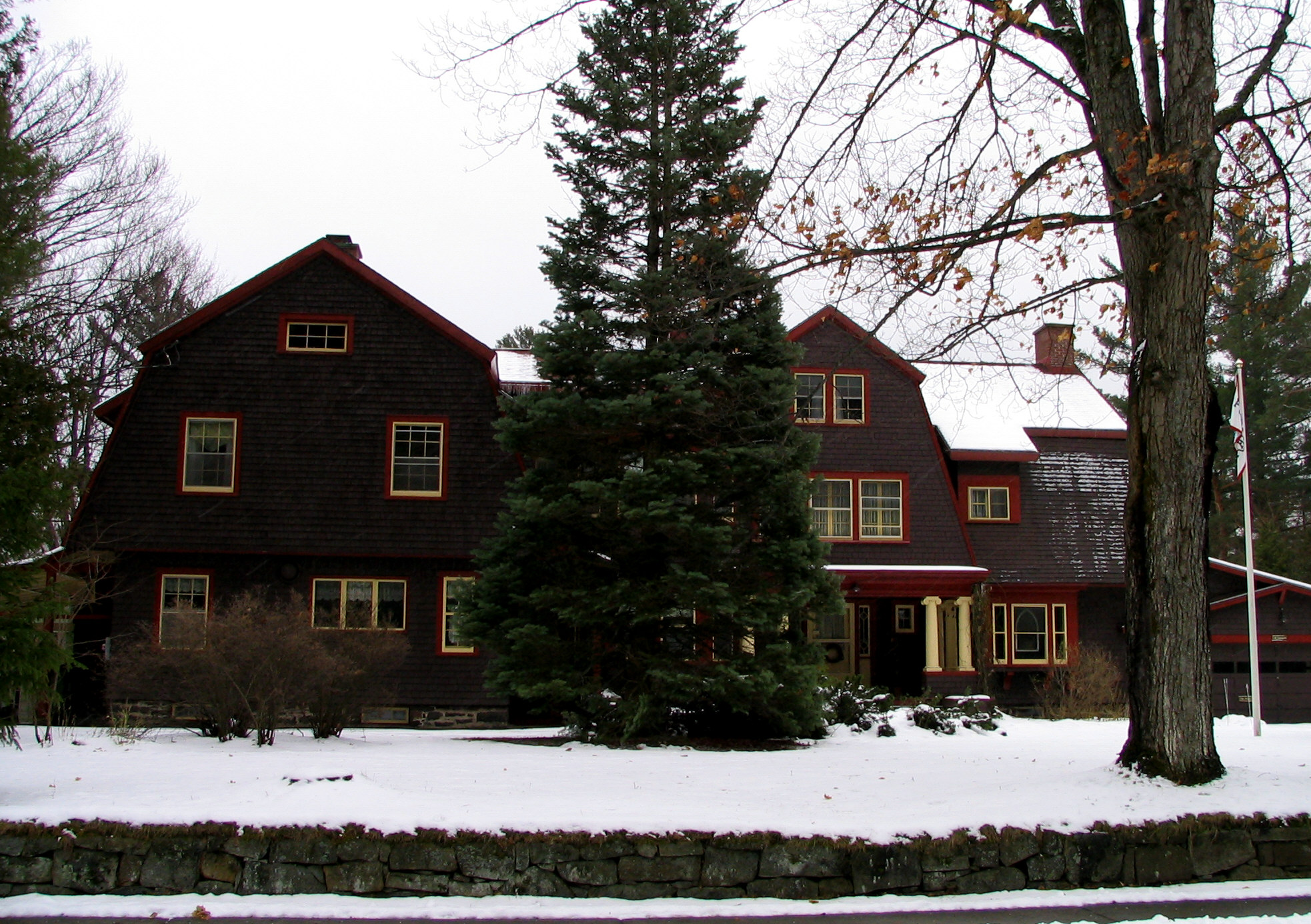
147 Park Avenue, Saranac Lake. Aldrich called it "The Porcupine" because it had so many good points. The "Cure Porches" are on the other side of the house. Presently, a bed and breakfast.

Aldrich died in Boston on March 19, 1907. His last words were recorded as, "In spite of it all, I am going to sleep; put out the lights." His Life was written by Ferris Greenslet (1908). He is buried on Grapevine Path lot 6109 of Mount Auburn Cemetery in Cambridge, Massachusetts.

In 1920, Aldrich's widow published her memoirs, Crowding Memories, which includes accounts of her husband's friendships with Mark Twain, William Dean Howells, Bret Harte, Henry James, James Russell Lowell, Harriet Beecher Stowe, Edwin Booth, and other cultural luminaries.

== Literary style and criticism ==
Aldrich wrote both in prose and verse. He was well known for his form in poetry. His successive volumes of verse, chiefly The Ballad of Babie Bell (1856), Pampinea, and Other Poems (1861), Cloth of Gold (1874), Flower and Thorn (1876), Friar Jerome's Beautiful Book (1881), Mercedes and Later Lyrics (1883), Wyndham Towers (1889), and the collected editions of 1865, 1882, 1897 and 1900, showed him to be a poet of lyrical skill and light touch. Critics believed him to show the influence of Robert Herrick.

He was a critic of the dialect verse that was popular at the time. In a 1900 letter referencing contemporary poet James Whitcomb Riley, he wrote, "The English language is too sacred a thing to be mutilated and vulgarized".

Aldrich's longer narrative or dramatic poems were not as successful. Notable work includes such lyrics as "Hesperides", "When the Sultan Goes to Ispahan", "Before the Rain", "Nameless Pain", "The Tragedy", "Seadrift", "Tiger Lilies", "The One White Rose", "Palabras Cariñosas", "Destiny", and the eight-line poem "Identity".

== Honors ==
In July 1967, Aldrich Street in Co-op City, Bronx, New York, was named in his honor.

== Published works ==
- Daisy's Necklace: and What Came of It (1857)
- The Course of True Love Never Did Run Smooth (1858)
- Out of His Head (1862)
- Père Antoine's Date Palm (1866)
- Pansie's Wish: A Christmas Fantasy, with a Moral (1870)
- The Story of a Bad Boy (1870)
- Marjorie Daw and Other People (1873)
- Prudence Palfrey (1874)
- The Queen of Sheba (1877)
- A Rivermouth Romance (1877)
- The Story of a Cat (1879)
- The Stillwater Tragedy (1880)
- From Ponkapog to Pesth (1883)
- The Second Son (1888)
- Wyndham Towers (1889)
- Aldrich, Thomas Bailey (1893) [1883]. An Old Town by the Sea (2nd ed.). Cambridge, Massachusetts: Riverside Press, H.O. Houghton & Co.
- Two Bites at a Cherry, with Other Tales (1894)
- Judith and Holofernes: A Poem (1896)
- A Sea Turn and Other Matters (1902)
- Ponkapog Papers (1903)
