= Winterport Historic District =

Historic district in Maine, United States

- U.S. National Register of Historic Places
- U.S. Historic district
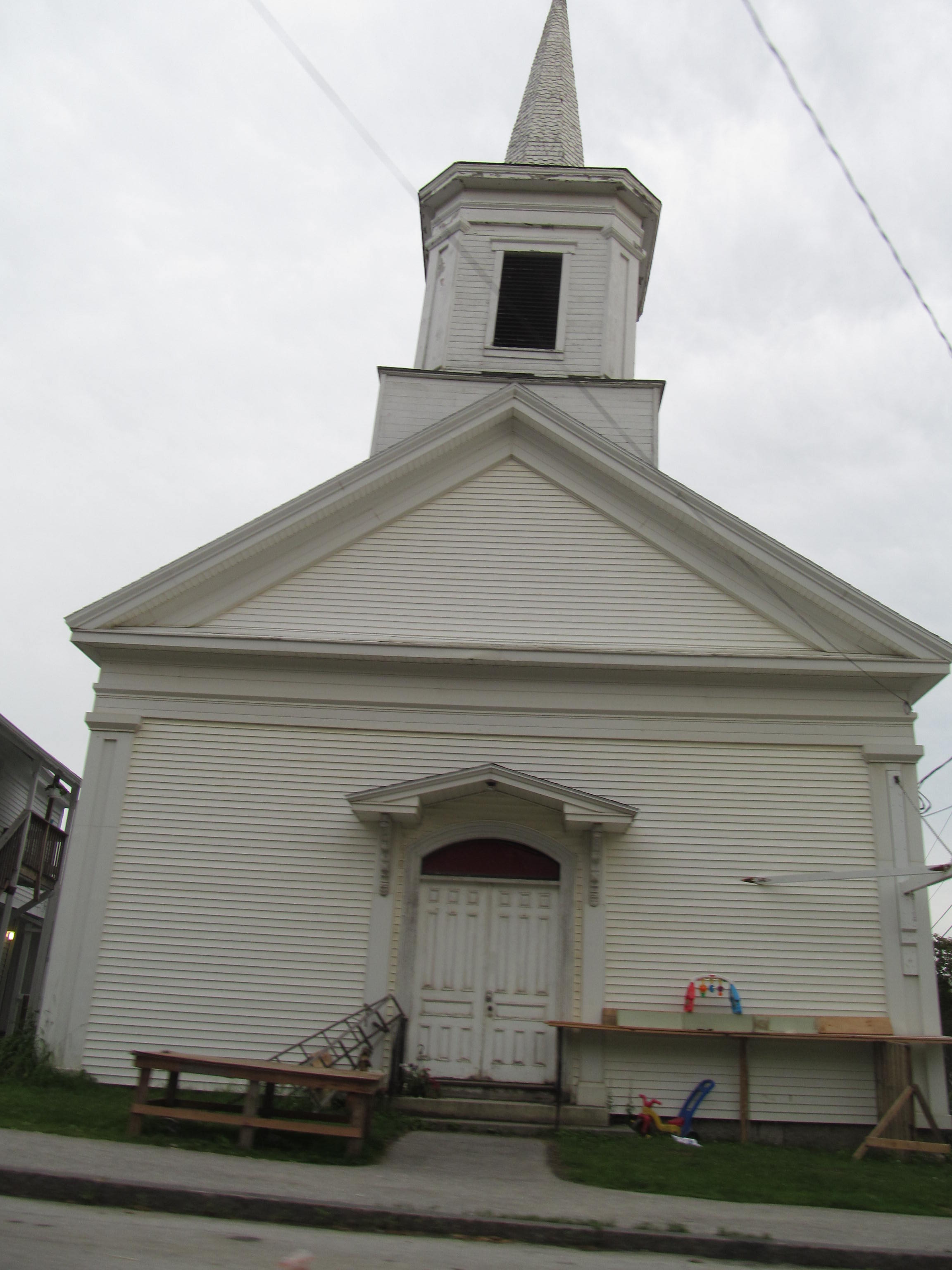

- Location within Maine Location within the United States
- Location: Irregular pattern along Main, Elm, Cushing, Lebanon, Commercial, Dean, and Water Sts., Winterport, Maine
- Coordinates: 44°38′10″N 68°50′53″W
- Area: 170 acres (69 ha)
- Architect: Ryder, Calvin; Multiple
- Architectural style: Greek Revival, Federal, Gothic Revival
- NRHP reference No.: 75000112
- Added to NRHP: October 3, 1975

The Winterport Historic District encompasses a significant portion of the town centre of Winterport, Maine. The town was mainly developed in the mid-19th century, when it served as the main winter port for Bangor, and features a high concentration of Greek Revival and Italianate architecture. It was listed on the National Register of Historic Places in 1975.

== Description and history ==
Winterport is located in northeastern Waldo County, on the west bank of the Penobscot River. Its village center is located in the southeastern part of town, on the banks of the river. Unlike the city of Bangor, 13 miles (21 km) to the north at the river's head of navigation, the river at Winterport was always free of ice in winter. Winterport was part of Frankfort until 1860. As Bangor's lumber industry boomed, Winterport also grew, as its major supply and shipping point in the winter. Its fortunes were largely ended by the Panic of 1857, resulting in a significant concentration of buildings in the village that were built in the preceding decades.

The historic center extends mainly along Main Street (United States Route 1A), from Holmes Street in the south to Cove Brook (just north of Merrill Lane). Additional properties lie in the district on the roads leading toward the river, and inland along Lebanon and Elm Streets, the major roads leading into the town's interior. The district covers 170 acres (69 ha) and includes 150 primary buildings. Many of these are residential properties in the Greek Revival style, and were built between the 1830s and 1850s. Notable non-residential buildings include Winterport's Italianate Town Hall, and four 19th-century churches, including the Winterport Congregational Church, whose design is credited to the regionally significant architect Calvin Ryder.

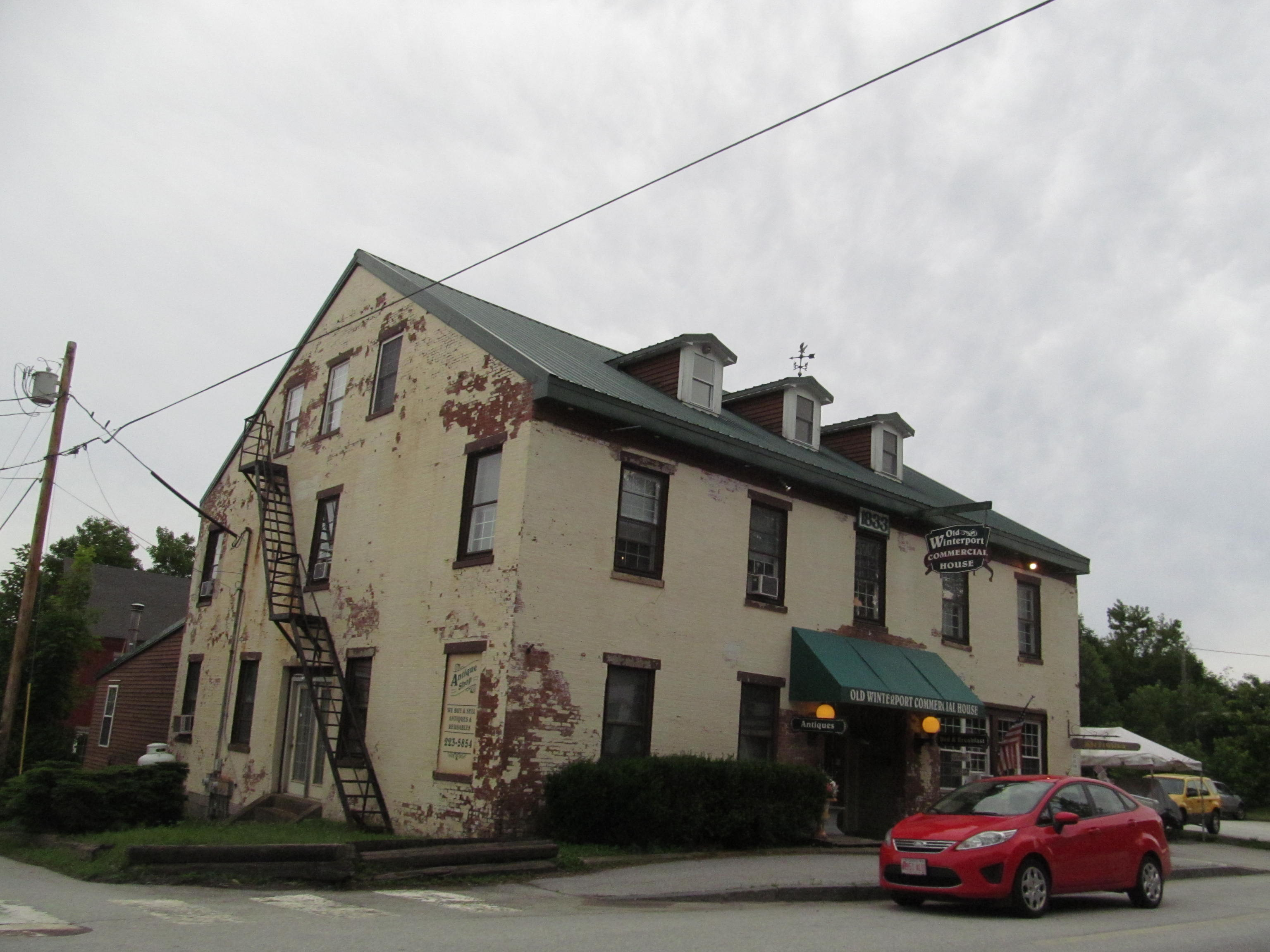
Old Commercial House, Winterport, ME

Another historic building, the (Old) Commercial House at the corner of Main and Commercial Streets, is a large brick structure built in 1833 - 1834. The original building was financed by the shareholders of the local Voluntary Hotel Association to serve as a way station for businessmen and travelers at this important transportation node between ferry transport up the Penobscot River and coach and goods travel along the north/south highway to Bangor. It was originally planned as a 40 bed hotel, with a large hall on the ground floor. Over the next decades, the Commercial House hall became a popular venue for local events, including the celebration of the Winterport Township Incorporation in 1860. Despite multiple changes in ownership, the hotel and inn continued to be used as a relay point for Concord commercial coaches traveling along the north/south highway. In 1965 the building was gutted by fire following an Independence Day celebration. It was not until 1973 that an investor was found to restore the historic building. It is now run as the Old Winterport Commercial House, a Bed & Breakfast with an antique store on the ground floor.

== See also ==
National Register of Historic Places listings in Waldo County, Maine
