= Winterport, Maine =

Town in Maine, United States

- Town
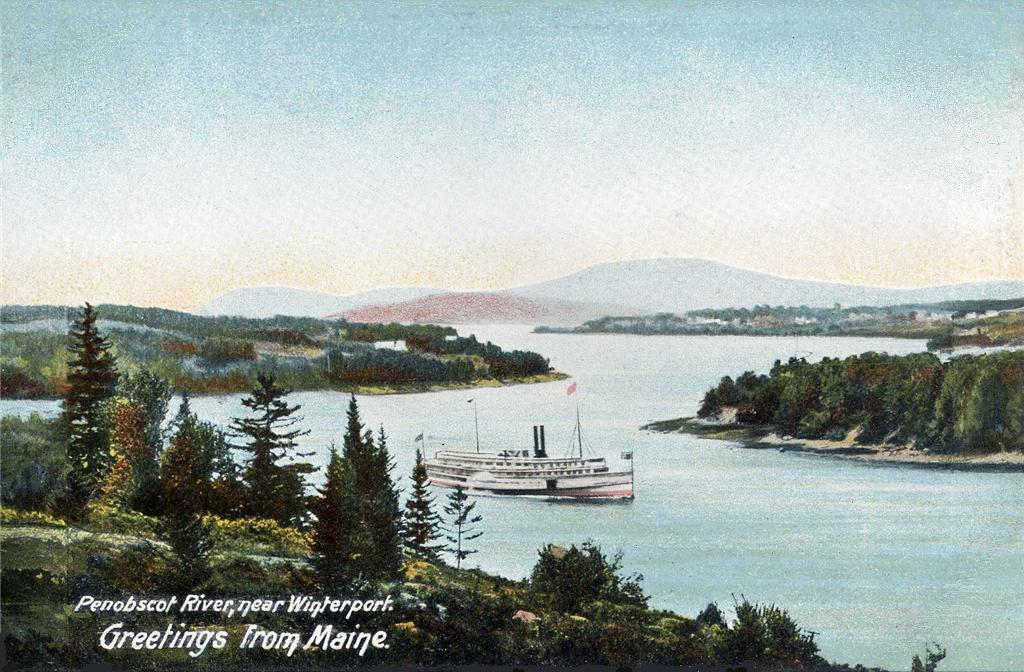
- Penobscot River in 1906

- Seal
- Motto(s): "A Great Place to Live and Work"
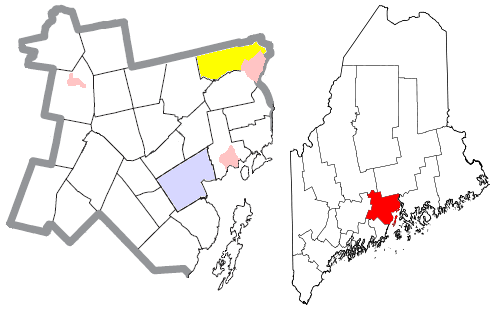
- Location of the town of Winterport (in yellow) in Waldo County and the state of Maine
- Coordinates: 44°38′21″N 68°54′40″W
- Country: United States
- State: Maine
- County: Waldo
- Incorporated: March 12, 1860

Government
  - Type: Town Council

Area
  - Total: 37.05 sq mi (95.96 km^{2})
  - Land: 35.52 sq mi (92.00 km^{2})
  - Water: 1.53 sq mi (3.96 km^{2})
- Elevation: 197 ft (60 m)

Population (2020)
  - Total: 3,817
  - Density: 107/sq mi (41.5/km^{2})
- Time zone: UTC-5 (Eastern (EST))
  - Summer (DST): UTC-4 (EDT)
- ZIP code: 04496
- Area code: 207
- FIPS code: 23-86760
- GNIS feature ID: 582822
- Website: www.winterportmaine.gov

Winterport is a town in Waldo County, Maine, United States. The population was 3,817 at the 2020 census. It contains the census-designated place of the same name. The Winterport Historic District, extending several blocks along Main Street (United States Route 1A), was listed on the National Register of Historic Places in 1975.

== History ==
First settled in 1766 as part of Frankfort, it was set off and incorporated on March 12, 1860. It was named Winterport because of its fine harbor on the Penobscot River estuary, which generally remained ice free, and so became a busy local terminus for trade and shipping during winter months. When the upper Penobscot River froze, commodities like flour were hauled in large quantities from here to Bangor.

In 1841, Theophilus Cushing opened a large steam mill which manufactured 11,000,000 feet of lumber annually. It also made sugar box shooks, lath, clapboard, and soap and candle boxes. The town had two cooperage factories. Other industries produced harnesses, cheese and butter, and men's vests. Until the Panic of 1857, Winterport was a shipbuilding center. But the principal business for most of the town was agriculture.

== Geography ==
According to the United States Census Bureau, the town has a total area of 37.05 square miles (95.96 km^{2}), of which, 35.52 square miles (92.00 km^{2}) of it is land and 1.53 square miles (3.96 km^{2}) is water. Drained by the Marsh River, Winterport is bounded by the Penobscot River.

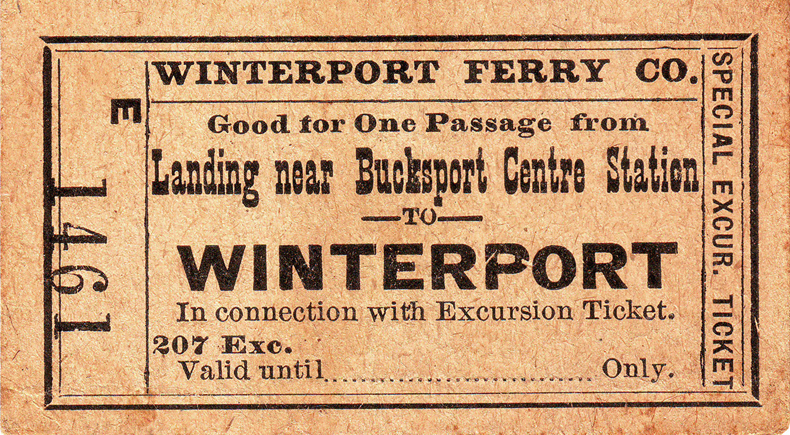
Winterport Ferry Co. ticket for travel between Winterport and Bucksport in the 1920s

The town is crossed by U.S. Route 1A, as well as Maine State Route 69 and Maine State Route 139. It borders the towns of Frankfort to the south, Monroe to the west, and Hampden and Newburgh to the north. Bucksport lies across the Penobscot River to the east which prior to the opening of the Waldo-Hancock Bridge in 1931 was reached from Winterport by way of the Winterport Ferry Co.

== Demographics ==
Historical population
Census	Pop.	Note	%±
1860	2,318		—
1870	2,744		18.4%
1880	2,260		−17.6%
1890	1,926		−14.8%
1900	1,623		−15.7%
1910	1,582		−2.5%
1920	1,433		−9.4%
1930	1,437		0.3%
1940	1,572		9.4%
1950	1,694		7.8%
1960	2,088		23.3%
1970	1,963		−6.0%
1980	2,675		36.3%
1990	3,175		18.7%
2000	3,602		13.4%
2010	3,757		4.3%
2020	3,817		1.6%
U.S. Decennial Census

=== 2010 census ===
As of the census of 2010, there were 3,757 people, 1,503 households, and 1,100 families living in the town. The population density was 105.8 inhabitants per square mile (40.8/km^{2}). There were 1,645 housing units at an average density of 46.3 per square mile (17.9/km^{2}). The racial makeup of the town was 97.0% White, 0.3% African American, 0.6% Native American, 0.7% Asian, 0.1% Pacific Islander, 0.2% from other races, and 1.1% from two or more races. Hispanic or Latino of any race were 0.8% of the population.

There were 1,503 households, of which 32.8% had children under the age of 18 living with them, 58.7% were married couples living together, 10.4% had a female householder with no husband present, 4.1% had a male householder with no wife present, and 26.8% were non-families. 20.0% of all households were made up of individuals, and 6.5% had someone living alone who was 65 years of age or older. The average household size was 2.50 and the average family size was 2.84.

The median age in the town was 41.5 years. 22.9% of residents were under the age of 18; 6.6% were between the ages of 18 and 24; 25.1% were from 25 to 44; 34.2% were from 45 to 64; and 11.2% were 65 years of age or older. The gender makeup of the town was 49.4% male and 50.6% female.

=== 2000 census ===
As of the census of 2000, there were 3,602 people, 1,379 households, and 1,035 families living in the town. The population density was 101.2 inhabitants per square mile (39.1/km^{2}). There were 1,461 housing units at an average density of 41.0 per square mile (15.8/km^{2}). The racial makeup of the town was 98.11% White, 0.19% Black or African American, 0.50% Native American, 0.22% Asian, 0.06% Pacific Islander, 0.11% from other races, and 0.81% from two or more races. Hispanic or Latino of any race were 0.39% of the population.

There were 1,379 households, out of which 36.0% had children under the age of 18 living with them, 62.1% were married couples living together, 9.4% had a female householder with no husband present, and 24.9% were non-families. 18.7% of all households were made up of individuals, and 6.2% had someone living alone who was 65 years of age or older. The average household size was 2.60 and the average family size was 2.96.

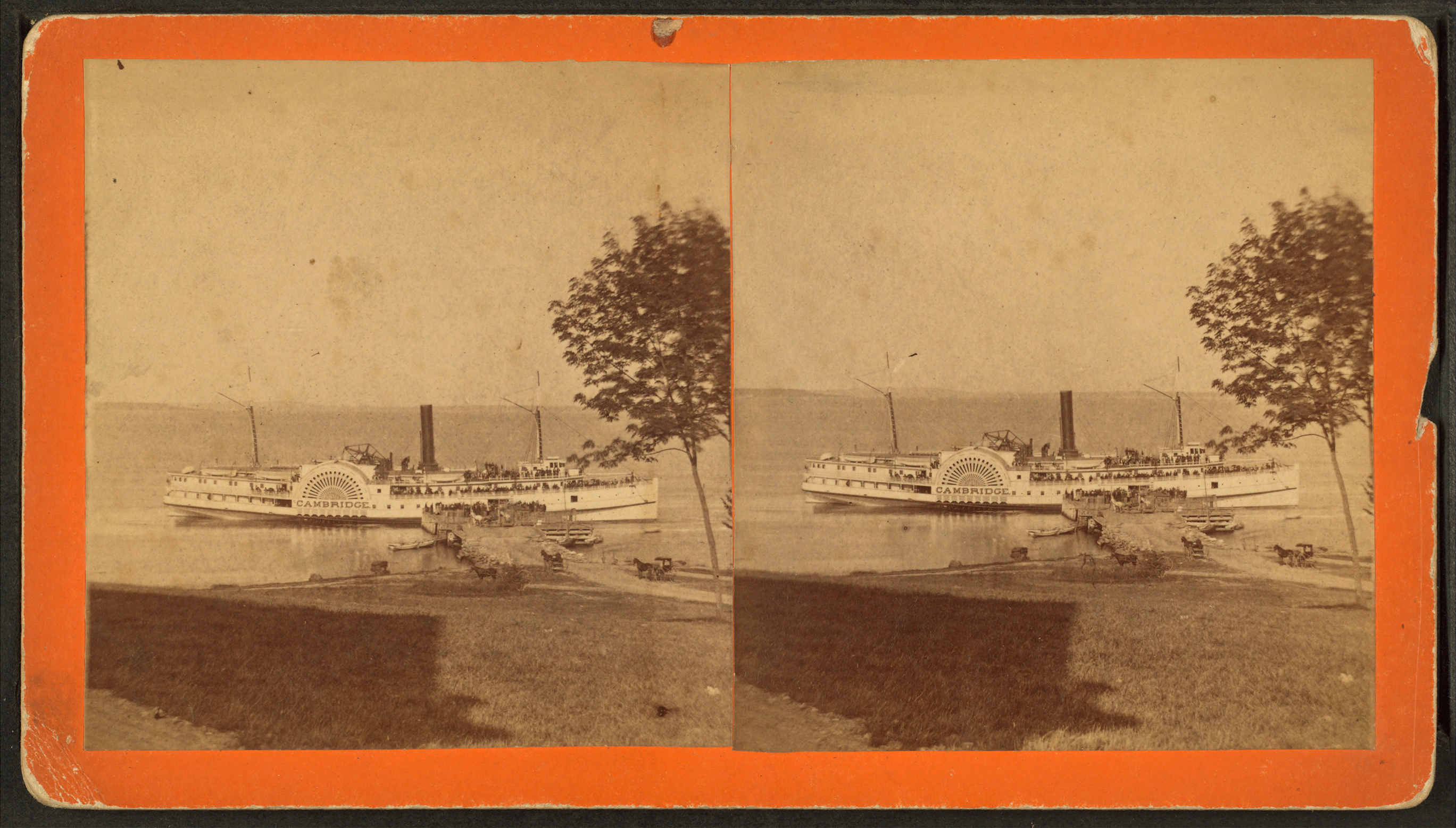
Steamboat Cambridge at the landing

In the town, the population was spread out, with 26.3% under the age of 18, 7.9% from 18 to 24, 30.4% from 25 to 44, 25.5% from 45 to 64, and 9.8% who were 65 years of age or older. The median age was 37 years. For every 100 females, there were 98.0 males. For every 100 females age 18 and over, there were 92.7 males.

The median income for a household in the town was $40,776, and the median income for a family was $50,041. Males had a median income of $31,473 versus $24,978 for females. The per capita income for the town was $18,235. About 10.4% of families and 13.1% of the population were below the poverty line, including 20.0% of those under age 18 and 20.2% of those age 65 or over.

== Site of interest ==
- Regional School Unit 22

== Notable people ==
- Mike Bordick, baseball shortstop (chiefly with Baltimore Orioles and Oakland A's)
- Joseph E. Brooks, state legislator and journalist
- Alice Osborne Curwen (McKeen), biologist and Episcopal women's leader
- Albert E. Fernald, MOH Recipient
- James Otis Kaler, journalist and children's author
- Frederick Low, US congressman and 9th governor of California
- Reagan Paul, state legislator
- Michael Thibodeau, Maine state senator
- Daniel White, brigadier general
