= The Journal of Comparative Neurology =

- Discipline: Neuroscience
- Language: English
- Edited by: Suzana Herculano-Houzel

Publication details
- Former names: Journal of Comparative Neurology and Psychology
- History: 1891–present
- Publisher: Wiley-Liss
- Frequency: 18/year
- Impact factor: 3.215 (2020)

Standard abbreviations
- ISO 4: J. Comp. Neurol.

Indexing
- CODEN: JCNEAM
- ISSN: 0021-9967 (print); 1096-9861 (web)
- LCCN: 46037484
- OCLC no.: 55538234

Links
- Journal homepage; Online access; Online archives

The Journal of Comparative Neurology is a peer-reviewed scientific journal that focuses on neuroscience and related fields, but specifically does not deal with clinical aspects of them. It was established in 1891, and is the oldest continuously published journal in the field of neuroscience. It was later published by the Wistar Institute of Anatomy and Biology and is currently published by Wiley-Liss. The editor-in-chief is Suzana Herculano-Houzel (Vanderbilt University). She is the journal's first female Editor-in-Chief.

From 1904 till 1910 the journal was named Journal of Comparative Neurology and Psychology.

== Abstracting and indexing ==
The journal is abstracted and indexed in:

- AGRIS
- Biological Abstracts
- BIOSIS Previews
- CAB Abstracts
- CAB HEALTH
- CABDirect
- Cambridge Scientific Abstracts
- Chemical Abstracts Service
- CSA Biological Sciences Database
- Current Contents/Life Sciences
- Embase
- International Bibliographic Information on Dietary Supplements
- Index Medicus/MEDLINE/PubMed
- Neuroscience Citation Index
- Neurosciences Abstracts
- Psychological Abstracts/PsycINFO
- Science Citation Index
- Scopus
- VINITI Database RAS
- The Zoological Record

According to the Journal Citation Reports, the journal has a 2020 impact factor of 3.215, ranking it 175th out of 273 journals in the category "Neurosciences" and 10th out of 175 journals in the category "Zoology".
