= James Otis Kaler =

American writer (1848–1912)

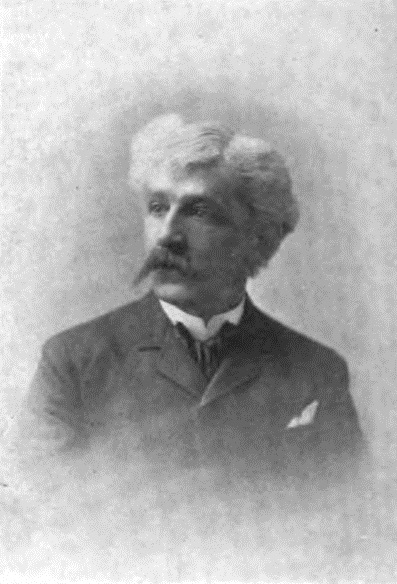
James Otis Kaler

James Otis Kaler (March 19, 1848 — December 11, 1912) was an American journalist and author of children’s literature. He wrote under the name James Otis.

== Life and career ==
Kaler was born on March 19, 1848, in Winterport, Maine. He attended public schools, then got a job with the Boston Journal at 13, and three years later was providing coverage of the American Civil War. Later, he worked as a journalist or editor for various newspapers, superintendent at schools, and a publicity man at a circus.

In 1880 he wrote his first, and still most famous (largely by way of a filmed version by Walt Disney), children's book, Toby Tyler; or, Ten Weeks with a Circus, a story about an orphan who runs away to join the circus. Following the book's success, he went on to author numerous other children's books, mostly historical and adventure novels. Like most writers of his era, he was astonishingly prolific, and a total of nearly 200 books by him have been identified. Most were signed with the Otis name, but he also used the pen names Walter Morris, Lt. James K. Orton, Harry Prentice, and Amy Prentice. (Some scholars believe that the latter books, which were aimed at a younger audience than most of his works, were in fact written by his wife.)

After spending several years in the southeastern states, he returned to Maine in 1898 to become the first superintendent of schools in South Portland. A school named in his honor still stands in that city.

He married Amy L. Scamman on March 19 of that year, and they had two sons, Stephen and Otis.

Kaler died of uremia on December 11, 1912, in Portland, Maine.

== List of his works ==
=== Boy Spies series ===
(these were reprints of earlier titles as shown)

1. With Lafayette at Yorktown: A Story of How Two Boys Joined the Continental Army (1895, repr 1912 as The Boy Spies with Lafayette: The Story of How Two Boys Joined the Continental Army)
2. With Washington at Monmouth: A Story of Three Philadelphia Boys (1897, repr 1912 as The Boy Spies of Philadelphia: The Story of How the Young Spies Helped the Continental Army at Valley Forge)
3. With Warren At Bunker Hill: A Story of the Siege of Boston (1898, repr 1912 as The Boy Spies at the Battle of Bunker Hill: A Story of the Siege of Boston)
4. Morgan, the Jersey Spy: A Story of the Siege of Yorktown in 1781 (1898, repr 1912 as The Boy Spies at Yorktown: The Story of How the Young Spies Helped General Lafayette)
5. With the Swamp Fox: A Story of General Marion’s Young Spies (1899, repr 1912 as The Boy Spies with the Swamp Fox: The Story of General Marion and His Young Spies)
6. A Tory Plot: A Story of the Attempt to Kill General Washington in 1776 (1899, repr 1912 as The Boy Spies of Old New York: The Story of How the Young Spies Prevented the Capture of General Washington)
7. The Defense of Fort Henry: A Story of Wheeling Creek in 1777 (1900, repr 1912 as The Boy Spies at the Defense of Fort Henry: A Boy’s Story of Wheeling Creek in 1777)
8. With the Regulators: A Story of North Carolina in 1768 (1901, repr 1912 as The Boy Spies with the Regulators: The Story of How the Boys Assisted the Carolina Patriots to Drive the British From That State)
9. At the Siege of Detroit: A Story of Two Ohio Boys in the War of 1812 (1904, repr 1912 as The Boy Spies at the Siege of Detroit: A Story of the Ohio Boys in the War of 1812)
10. Commodore Barney's Young Spies: A Boy’s Story of the Burning of the City of Washington (1907, repr 1912 as The Boy Spies on Chesapeake Bay: The Story of Two Young Spies Under Commodore Barney)

=== Navy Boys series ===
(these were reprints of earlier titles as shown)

1. The Capture of the Laughing Mary: A Story of Three New York Boys in 1776 (1898, repr1912 as The Navy Boys in New York Bay)
2. Amos Dunkle, Oarsman (1899, repr 1909 as A Struggle for Freedom: The Story of Young Amos Dunkle, Oarsman in the Whale Boat Navy, in 1776, and again in 1912 as The Navy Boys on Long Island Sound: A Story of the Whale Boat Navy of 1776)
3. At the Siege of Havana: The Experience of Three Boys Serving Under Israel Putnam in 1762 (1899, repr 1912 as The Navy Boys at the Siege of Havana)
4. A Cruise with John Paul Jones: A Story of Naval Warfare in 1778 (1899, repr 1912 as The Navy Boys Cruise with John Paul Jones)
5. Afloat in Freedom's Cause: The Story of Two Boys in the War of 1812, as Told by Ezra Brownrigg (1908, repr 1912 as The Navy Boys on Lake Ontario)
6. The Cruise of the Pickering: A Boy’s Story of Privateering in 1780 (1909, repr 1912 as The Navy Boys Cruise on the Pickering)
7. With Grant at Vicksburg: A Boy’s Story of the Siege of Vicksburg (1910, repr 1912 as The Navy Boys with Grant at Vicksburg)

=== Minute Boys series ===
1. The Minute Boys of the Green Mountains (1904)
2. The Minute Boys of the Mohawk Valley (1905)
3. The Minute Boys of the Wyoming Valley (1906)
4. The Minute Boys of South Carolina: A Story of How we Boys Aided Marion, the Swamp Fox (1907)
5. The Minute Boys of Long Island: A Story of New York in 1776 (1908)
6. The Minute Boys of New York City (1909)
7. The Minute Boys of Boston (1910)
8. The Minute Boys of Philadelphia (1911)
9. The Minute Boys of Yorktown (1912)

=== American Book Company series ===
1. Calvert of Maryland: A Story of Lord Baltimore's Colony (1910)
2. Mary of Plymouth: A Story of the Pilgrim Settlement (1910)
3. Peter of New Amsterdam: A Story of Old New York (1910)
4. Richard of Jamestown: A Story of the Virginia Colony (1910)
5. Ruth of Boston: A Story of the Massachusetts Bay Colony (1910)
6. Stephen of Philadelphia: A Story of the Penn's Colony (1910)
7. Hannah of Kentucky: A Story of the Wilderness Road (1912)
8. Benjamin of Ohio: A Story of the Settlement of Marietta (1912)
9. Seth of Colorado: A Story of the Settlement of Denver (1912)
10. Antoine of Oregon: A Story of the Oregon Trail (1912)
11. Martha of California: A Story of the California Trail (1913)
12. Philip of Texas: A Story of Sheep Raising in Texas (1913)

=== Other historical novels ===
1. Ezra Jordan's Escape from the Massacre at Fort Loyall (1895)
2. Neal the Miller, a Son of Liberty (1895)
3. An Island Refuge: Casco Bay in 1676 (1895)
4. The Boys of 1745 at the Capture of Louisbourg (1895)
5. Under the Liberty Tree: A Story of the Boston Massacre (1896)
6. At the Siege of Quebec (1897)
7. The Boys of Fort Schuyler (1897)
8. The Signal Boys of ‘75: A Tale of Boston During the Siege (1897)
9. Sarah Dillard's Ride: A Story of the Carolinas in 1780 (1898)
10. The Boys of '98 (1898)
11. The Charming Sally, Privateer Schooner of New York: A Tale of 1765 (1898)
12. The Cruise of the Comet: A Story of a Privateer of 1812 Sailing From Baltimore (1898)
13. When Israel Putnam Served the King (1898)
14. A Traitor's Escape: A Story of the Attempt to Seize Benedict Arnold After He Had Fled to New York (1898)
15. Captain Tom, the Privateersman of the Armed Brig Chasseur (1899)
16. Corporal ‘Lige's Recruit: A Story of Crown Point and Ticonderoga (1899)
17. With Perry On Lake Erie: A Tale of 1812 (1899)
18. When Dewey Went to Manila, or, Among the Filipinos (1899)
19. Off Santiago With Sampson (1899)
20. Boston Boys of 1775, or When We Besieged Boston (1900)
21. The Armed Ship America, or When We Sailed from Salem (1900)
22. On the Kentucky Frontier: A Story of the Fighting Pioneers of the West (1900)
23. With Preble at Tripoli: A Story of "Old Ironsides" and the Tripolitan War (1900)
24. When We Destroyed the Gaspee: A Story of Narragansett Bay in 1772 (1901)
25. With Porter in the Essex: A Story of His Famous Cruise in Southern Waters During the War of 1812 (1901)
26. Our Uncle the Major: A Story of New York in 1765 (1901)
27. How the Twins Captured a Hessian: A Story of Long Island in 1776 (1902)
28. The Cruise of the Enterprise: Being a Story of the Struggle and Defeat of the French Privateering Expeditions Against the United States in 1779 (1902)
29. With Rodgers on the President: The Story of the Cruise Wherein the Flagship Fired the First Hostile Shot in the War with Great Britain for the Rights of American Seamen (1903)
30. Across the Delaware: A Boy's Story of the Battle of Trenton in 1777 (1903)
31. Defending the Island: A Story of Bar Harbor in 1758 (1904)
32. Dorothy’s Spy: A Story of the First Fourth of July Celebration (1904)
33. When Washington Served the King: A Boy’s Story of Border Warfare in 1754 (1905)
34. With Porter in the Essex (1910)
35. With Sherman to the Sea: A Boy’s Story of General Sherman’s Famous March and Capture of Savannah (1911)

(Some of the above were reprinted in omnibus editions, as shown:

1. True Indian Tales from American History in the Stirring Days of the Early Colonists (1923; includes Defending the Island, Ezra Jordan’s Escape, An Island Refuge, and When Israel Putnam Served the King)
2. True Adventure Tales from American History in the Stirring Days of the Revolution (1924; includes The Boston Boys of 1775, Neal, the Miller, The Signal Boys of ’75, and Under the Liberty Tree)
3. True Sea Tales from American History (1925; includes When we Destroyed the Gaspee, When Dewey Came to Manila, Off Santiago with Sampson, and The Boys of 1745 at the Capture of Louisburg))

=== Silver Fox Farm series ===
1. The Wireless Station at Silver Fox Farm (1910)
2. The Aeroplane at Silver Fox Farm (1911)
3. Building an Airship at Silver Fox Farm (1912)
4. Airship Cruising From Silver Fox Farm (1913)

=== Toby Tyler trilogy ===
1. Toby Tyler; or, Ten Weeks with a Circus (1880)
2. Mr. Stubbs' Brother (1882)
3. Old Ben, The Friend of Toby Tyler and Mr Stubb's Brother (1911)

=== Tommy duo ===
1. How Tommy Saved the Barn (1895)
2. Christmas at Deacon Hackett's: A Sequel to How Tommy Saved the Barn (1899)

=== School stories ===
1. Bob Porter at Lakeview Academy (as by Walter Morris, 1902)
2. Reuben Green's Adventures at Yale (1902)
3. Tom Dexter Goes to School (1915)

=== Stories of New York life ===
1. In Bottle Alley: A Story of Real Life in New York City (1884)
2. Left Behind, or Ten Days a Newsboy (1885)
3. Josiah in New York, or, A Coupon from the Fresh Air Fund (1893)
4. Jenny Wren's Boarding House: A Story of Newsboy Life in New York (1893)
5. The Boys' Revolt: A Story of the Street Arabs of New York (1894)
6. Jerry's Family: A Story of a Street Waif of New York (1895)
7. Teddy and Carrots, Two Merchants of Newspaper Row (1896)

=== Other works of fiction ===
1. After Dark in Boston: A Working Girl's Faith and Fate (1880)
2. Tim and Tip, or, The Adventures of a Boy and a Dog (1883)
3. The Clown's Protege (1883)
4. Raising the Pearl (1883)
5. An Emperor's Son (1884)
6. The Roaring Lions, or The Famous Club of Ashbury (1884, repr 1913)
7. A Monkey Kingdom; or, Ninety Days in Apeland (anon., 1884)
8. Silent Pete, or The Stowaways (1886)
9. The Castaways, or On the Florida Reefs (1888)
10. Little Joe (1888)
11. A Runaway Brig, or An Accidental Cruise (1888)
12. The Treasure-Finders: A Boy’s Adventures in Nicaragua (1889)
13. The Braganza Diamond (1891)
14. Jack the Hunchback (1892)
15. An Unprovoked Mutiny (1892)
16. The Search for the Silver City: A Tale of Adventure in Yucatán (1893)
17. The Adventures of a Country Boy at a Country Fair (1893, repr 1900 as Teddy: The...)
18. Dick in the Desert (1893)
19. Chasing a Yacht, or The Theft of the Gem (1894)
20. Jinny and His Partners (1894)
21. Andy's Ward, or The International Museum (1895)
22. Wood Island Light; or, Ned Sanford’s Refuge (1905)
23. The Boy Captain, or From Forecastle to Cabin (1896)
24. Wrecked on Spider Island, or, How Ned Rogers Found the Treasure (1896)
25. On Schedule Time (1896)
26. Admiral J. of Spurwink (1896)
27. A Short Cruise (1896)
28. The Wreck of the Circus (1897)
29. Joel Harford (1898)
30. An Amateur Fireman (1898)
31. Dick in the Desert (1898)
32. A District Message Boy and a Necktie Party (1898)
33. The Princess and Joe Potter (1898)
34. Telegraph Tom's Venture (1899)
35. Chased Through Norway, or Two Million Dollars Missing (1899)
36. Wheeling for Fortune (1899)
37. The Life Savers: A Story of the United States Life-Saving Service (1899)
38. Down the Slope (1899)
39. Messenger #48 (1899)
40. Aunt Hannah and Seth: A Story of Some People and a Dog (1900)
41. Larry Hudson's Ambition (1901)
42. Inland Waterways, or The Cruise of the Restless (1901)
43. The Lobster Catchers (1901)
44. The Treasure of Cocos Island (1902)
45. Wan Lun and Dandy. The Story of a Chinese Boy and a Dog (1902, repr as Stockton Boys’ Adventures; or, Wan Lun and Dandy)
46. With the Treasure-Hunters: A Story of the Florida Cays (1903)
47. Joey at the Fair (1906)
48. The Light Keepers: A Story of the United States Light-House Service (1906)
49. Among the Fur Traders (1906)
50. Aboard the Hylow on Sable Island Bank (1907)
51. The Wreck of the Ocean Queen: A Story of the Sea (1907)
52. The Cruise of the Phoebe: A Story of Lobster Buying on the Eastern Coast (1908)
53. Two Stowaways Aboard the Ellen Maria (1908)
54. The Sarah Jane, Dickey Dalton, Captain: a Story of Tugboating in Portland Harbor (1909)
55. Found by the Circus (1909)
56. The Cruise of the Sally D. (1910)
57. Adventures in Mexico (1911)
58. Boy Scouts in the Maine Woods (1911)
59. The Camp on Indian Island (1911)
60. Hunting in Africa (1911)
61. "Wanted," and Other Stories (1912)
62. Trapping in the Tropics; or, Adventures on the Great Amazon (1912)
63. The Wreck of the Princess (1912)
64. The Cruise of the Sprite (1912)
65. Ralph Gurney's Oil Speculation (1912)
66. Roy Barton's Adventures on the Mexican Border (1912)
67. Boy Scouts in a Lumber Camp (1913)
68. "Across the Range," and Other Stories (1914)
69. The Club at Crow's Corner (1915)

=== Nonfiction ===
1. The Story of American Heroism (anon., 1899)
2. The Life of John Paul Jones (1900)
3. Fighting for the Empire: The Story of the War in South Africa (1900)
4. The Story of Old Falmouth (1901)
5. The Story of Pemaquid (1902)
6. Geography of Maine (1910)

=== As by Lt. James K. Orton ===
1. The Secret Chart; or, Treasure Hunting in Hayti (1902)
2. Last Chance Mine; or, Dale Wrightman’s Pluck (1902)
3. Beach-Boy Joe, or Among the Life-Savers (1903)
4. Tom Havens with the White Squadron (1903)

=== As by Amy Prentice ===
1. Billy Goat's Story (1906)
2. The Brown Owl's Story (1906)
3. Bunny Rabbit's Story (1906)
4. Croaky Frog's Story (1906)
5. Frisky Squirrel's Story (1906)
6. Gray Goose's Story (1906)
7. Mouser Cat's Story (1906)
8. Plodding Turtle's Story (1906)
9. Quacky Duck's Story (1906)
10. Towser Dog's Story (1906)

=== As by Harry Prentice ===
1. Ben Burton, the Slate-Picker (1888, repr 1892 as The Slate-Picker: A Story of a Boy’s Life in the Coal Mines)
2. The King of Apeland: The Wonderful Adventures of a Young Animal-Trainer (1888)
3. Captured by Zulus: A Story of Trapping in Africa (1890)
4. Captured by Apes; or, How Philip Garland Became King of Apeland (1892)
5. The Boy Explorers, or The Adventures of Two Boys in Alaska (1895)
