= Tidewater Building =

Building in Los Angeles

Coordinates: 34.062099°N 118.319250°W

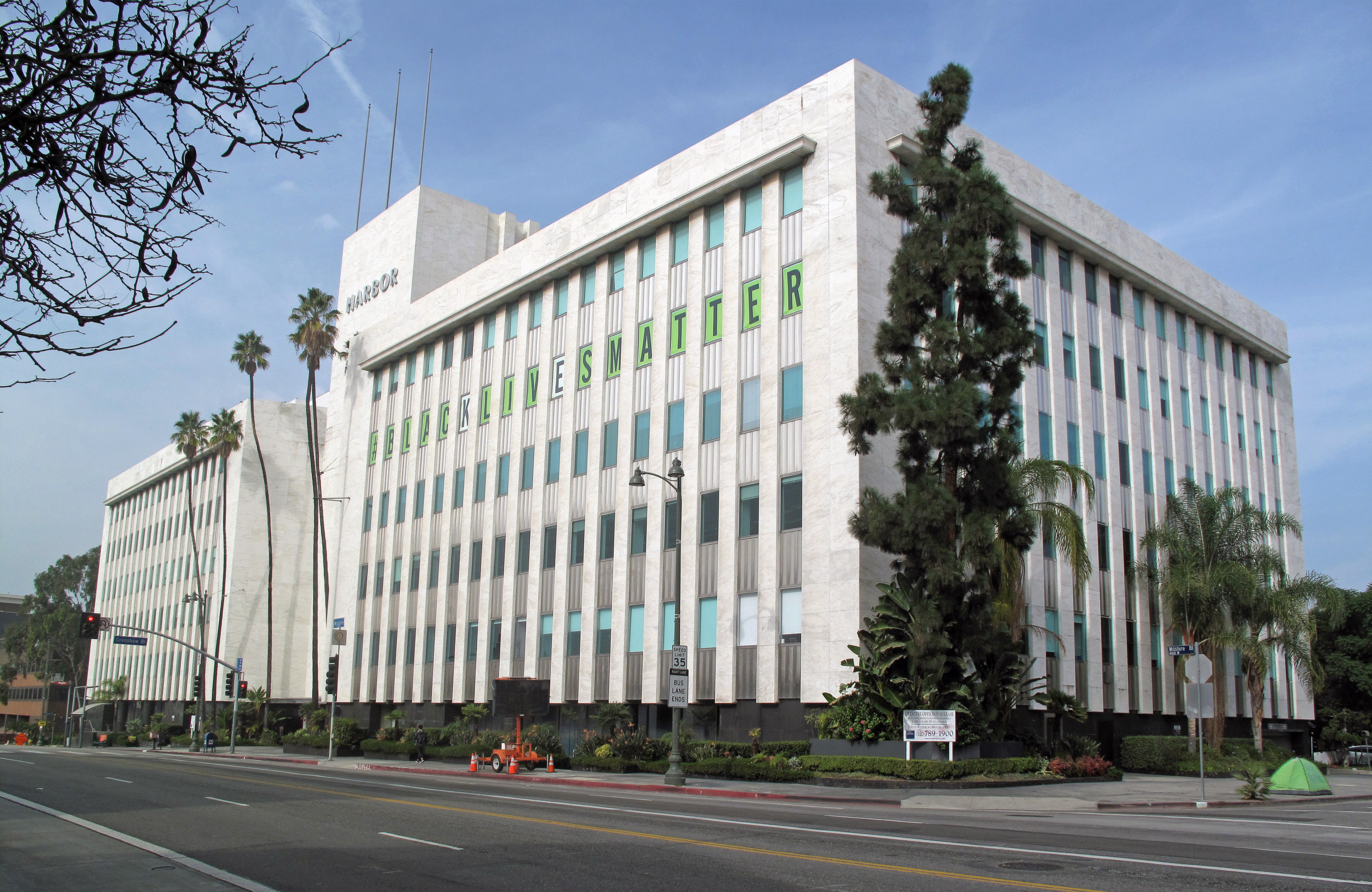

General information
- Location: 4201 Wilshire Boulevard, Los Angeles, California
- Opened: December 1, 1958

Design and construction
- Architecture firm: Claud Beelman & Associates

The Tidewater Building is a six-storey office in Los Angeles, California. The building was constructed as the headquarters of the Tidewater Oil Company following its takeover by J. Paul Getty, and was built on the site of the former William O. Jenkins House, which Getty had purchased in 1937. The building's architect was Claud Beelman. It was planned to include 13 storeys, however, only six were constructed. In 1966, Tidewater sold the building to Phillips Petroleum, at which point it became known as the Phillips Building. Phillips kept the building only for three years and sold it in 1969 to Harbor Insurance, a subsidiary of Unionamerica, Inc., the holding company of the Union Bank & Trust Company. Since 1969, the building has been known as the Harbor Building.

== History and design ==
The property on which the Tidewater Building sits was laid out by government surveyors in the 1860s and was bought in 1884 by John L. Plummer as a farm. In 1918, William O. Jenkins purchased the property with the intention of building a country house that he believed would be sufficiently far from the encroachment of the city. Jenkins hired architect T. Beverley Keim to design the 14-bedroom William O. Jenkins House, which cost in the vicinity of $200,000. However, by the 1930s, Los Angeles had grown far beyond what Jenkins predicted, and his country house had become surrounded by the city. Consequently, in 1936, Jenkins sold the house to J. Paul Getty. The new owner left the house vacant save for the caretakers, Walter A. Anderson and his wife Solveig. In 1950, the home was used for the filming of Sunset Boulevard.

The Jenkins House had been subject to a 1911 zoning restriction that mandated the section of Wilshire be kept for residential purposes for 50 years. In January 1954, Getty began a court battle to set aside the restrictions ahead of their 1961 end and convert the property to commercial use. The defendants in the suit were 179 home owners in the Windsor Square area. On February 8, 1954, Superior Judge Alfred L. Bartlett ruled in Getty's favor, allowing the owner to build an office on the site.

In January 1932, Getty had begun buying shares of the Tidewater Oil Company. However it was not until 1951 that he acquired majority control of the company.

Getty arranged the demolition of the Jenkins House in February 1957. On April 17, 1957, Tidewater president David T. Staples announced from San Francisco that his company would construct a six-storey office on Wilshire Boulevard. The $10,000,000 building was designed by Claud Beelman & Associates and would be built by the C. L. Peck Construction & Realty Company. The building in Corporate Moderne style would be clad in black granite on the first floor, and white marble on the upper floors, with aluminum spandrels. Although it would be built only to six storeys, it included provisions to expand in future to 13 storeys. Three storeys of below-ground parking accommodating 400 cars would be included, and there would be a total of 427,000 square feet of usable floor space. The lobby was to include aluminum murals by Nikos Bel-Jon, depicting oil industry scenes. Construction was scheduled to begin immediately, with completion expected in the second half of 1958. Long-term financing for construction was provided by the New York Life Insurance Company. Several days later, the Los Angeles Times published a sketch by the architect. By the fall of 1957, work was well underway on the steel frame, which was constructed by Bethlehem Pacific. The building was designed around a 125-foot high central core flanked by two equal blocks. Beelman's design was largely similar to his earlier Superior Oil Building.

On November 26, 1958, Tidewater gave a preview tour of the new building. Company president George F. Getty II said construction of the building was "the latest step of the company in improving its competitive position in the industry." On Monday, December 1, 1957, Tidewater moved into its new headquarters. At the time of the move, there would be 600 Tidewater employees in the building, occupying the upper four floors. The main and second floor were occupied by the Bank of America, Security First National Bank, and E. F. Hutton & Company. On December 5, Tidewater held the official dedication ceremony for the new building; the date coincided with the company's 80th birthday. During the ceremony, George F. Getty II gave a speech tracing the company's history from 1878. Getty told the press that the transfer of the head offices from San Francisco to Los Angeles was "because Los Angeles has become the oil and financial center of the west." Vice-president Charles R. Brown remarked that "those of us died-in-the-wool San Franciscans may have recoiled at the thought of living in Los Angeles. San Francisco with its cold winds, damp fogs, noisy cable cars seems to be fading fast from our memories." Recorded speeches by William F. Humphrey, president from 1933 to 1953, and J. Paul Getty were played for the audience, while chairman of the board David T. Staples made the official welcome. On December 9, the city hosted a luncheon at the Statler Hilton to welcome Tidewater to the city. The event was attended by mayor Norris Poulson, Advertising Club president Robert L. Hemmings, and Los Angeles Chamber of Commerce president George B. Gose.

In November 1963, Tidewater reached an agreement to sell its western refining and marketing assets to Humble Oil. The sale would include the Tidewater Building. However, the purchase was blocked by the justice department in May 1964. In March 1966, Tidewater announced a deal with Phillips Petroleum to sell the latter its west coast refining and retailing operations for $385 million. As part of the deal, Phillips would buy the Tidewater Building. The deal was expected to close June 30. After postponing the sale, the Justice Department sued to block the deal. However, the department lost in court and the sale proceeded. After the deal closed, the Tidewater Building became known as the Phillips Building. On January 25, 1967, George F. Getty II announced that Tidewater would transfer its headquarters to the new Getty Building, while the company's western division would move to the Tishman Building.

In October 1969, the Harbor Insurance Company purchased the building from Phillips for around $6 million. Phillips said the sale was because it did not have enough employees based there to justify owning a building that size. Harbor was a subsidiary of Unionamerica, Inc. (formerly Union Bancorp), the holding company of the Union Bank & Trust Company. Upon the purchase, the building would serve as the headquarters for three Unionamerica subsidiaries: Harbor, Swett & Crawford, and the Western Mortgage Corporation. Since the sale, the building has been called the Harbor Building.

== Drawings ==
Original plans for the building are held at the Art, Design & Architecture Museum of the University of California, Santa Barbara as part of the Claud W. Beelman architectural drawings collection.
