= Society for the Preservation of Downtown Los Angeles =

Non profit advocacy organization

- Abbreviation: SP-DTLA
- Formation: 2015
- Type: 501(c)(3) nonprofit organization
- Purpose: Supporting sustainable commercial and residential development in historic downtown Los Angeles
- Headquarters: Downtown Los Angeles, California
- Director: Alex Hertzberg
- Website: www.sp-dtla.org

Society for the Preservation of Downtown Los Angeles, also known as SP-DTLA, is a 501(c)(3) organization that advocates what it characterizes as responsible and respectful development around and among Downtown Los Angeles' historic structures. SP-DTLA supports development with a positive impact on the designated Los Angeles Historic-Cultural Monuments in Downtown Los Angeles, especially those in the Historic Core.

SP-DTLA supports viewshed protection and a "zone of respect" around preserved buildings.

SP-DTLA's particular focus is on the seven by four block area (3rd to Olympic Streets and Hill to Main Streets), which includes the Broadway Theater District.

== Current Causes ==
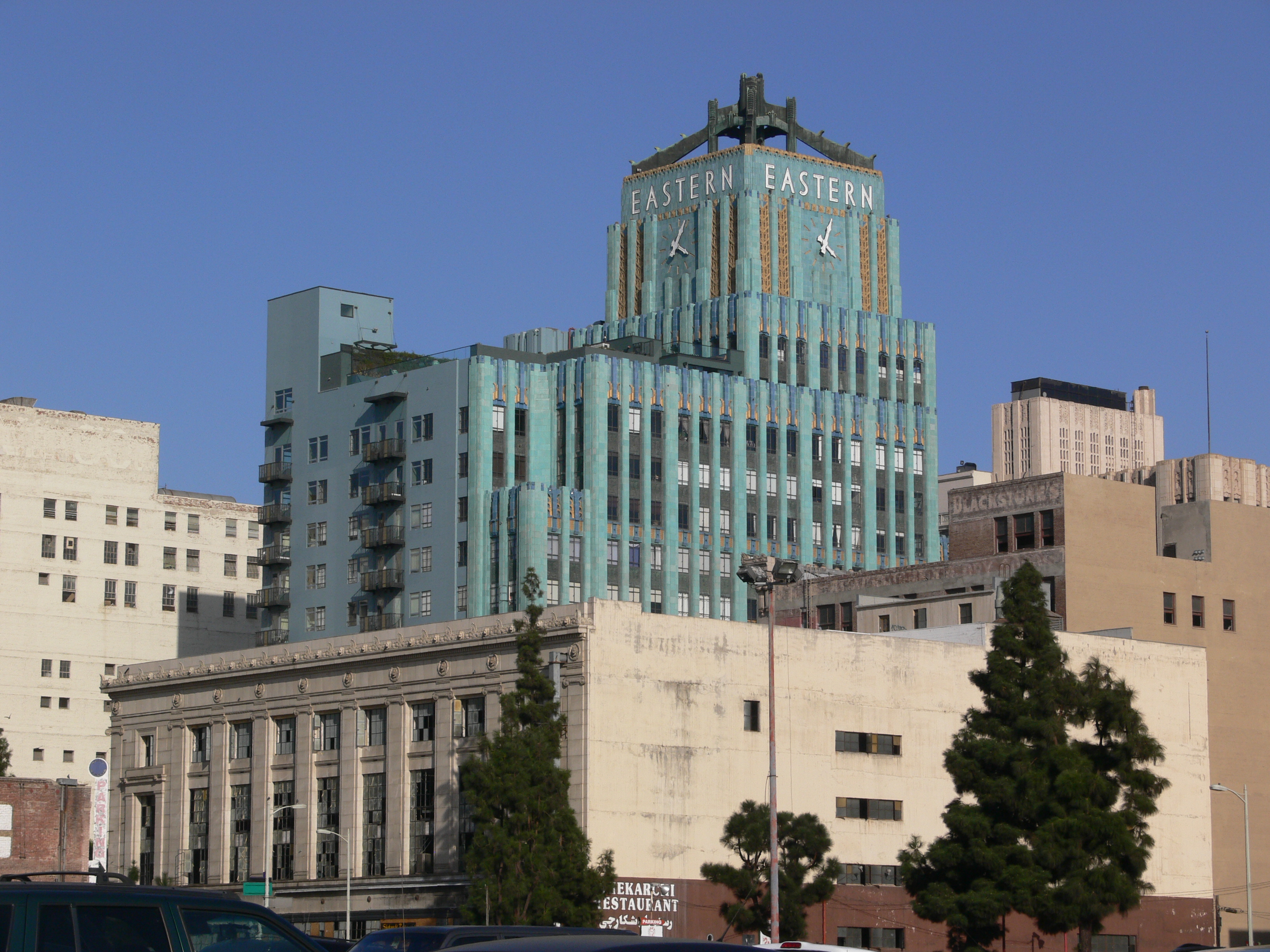
LA Eastern Columbia Building

SP-DTLA is best known for its opposition to the Alexan South Broadway project in proximity to the 1930 Eastern Columbia Building and its landmark clock. The group is also opposing two other downtown projects which they argue have a height and mass out of scale with the character of the adjacent historic buildings.
