= Getty Building =

Getty Building may refer to:

- Getty Building (Los Angeles)
- Getty Residences in New York City, also known as the Getty Building
