= Buster Keaton's Italian villa =

1926 Beverly Hills mansion

Buster Keaton's Italian Villa
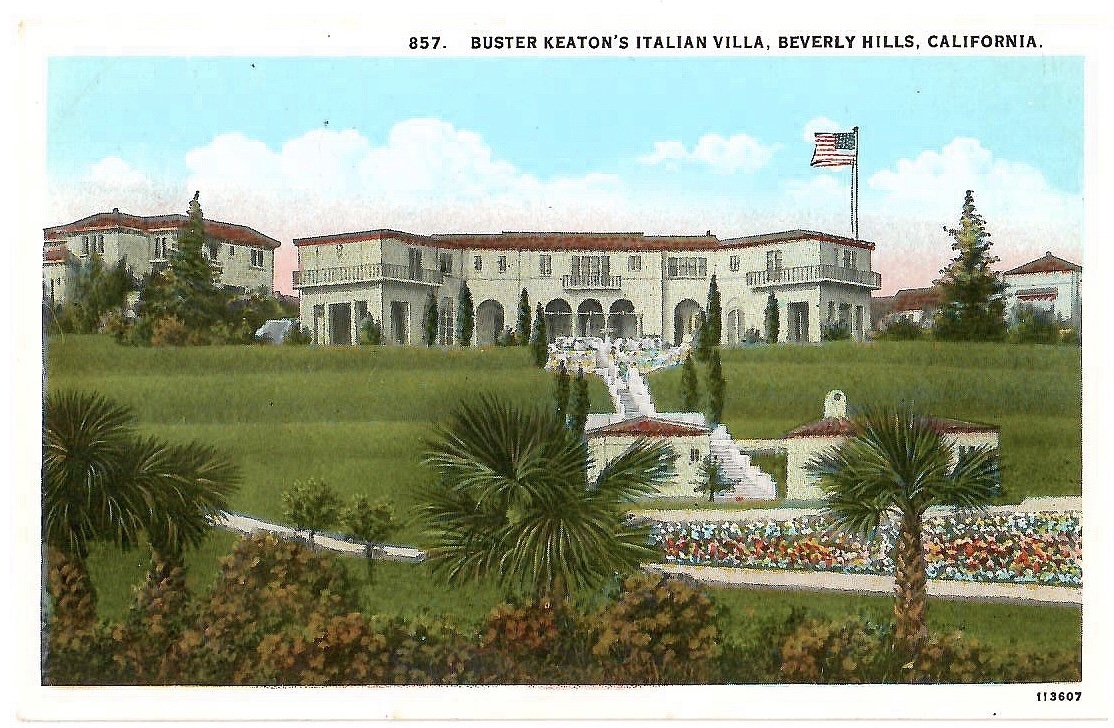
- Interactive map of the Buster Keaton's Italian Villa area
- Alternative names: Buster Keaton Estate

General information
- Location: 1004 Hartford Way, now 1018 Pamela Drive
- Coordinates: 34.0850°N 118.4197°W
- Completed: 1926
- Cost: US$300,000 (equivalent to $5,455,827 in 2025)
- Client: Buster Keaton, Natalie Talmadge

Design and construction
- Architect: Gene Verge

Buster Keaton's Italian villa is a historic home of California, United States. The original address was 1004 Hartford Way in Beverly Hills. Somewhat less opulent than Pickfair or the Harold Lloyd Estate, the house was grand by any other measure, and has been described as one of Beverly Hills' most celebrated properties. It was the second of two homes Keaton built in Beverly Hills during his creative heyday to share with his wife, actress Natalie Talmadge, their children, and their extensive friend group.

== History ==
In 1924, American film actor-director-producer-stuntman Buster Keaton secretly built a house in Beverly Hills for him and his wife Natalie to live in, but upon seeing it, she rejected her gift. She had to keep up appearances, especially in comparison with her actress sisters Norma Talmadge and Constance Talmadge, and she thought the house was too small and insufficient in that it lacked for servants' quarters.

Keaton tried again. He bought another lot, behind the Beverly Hills Hotel, and collaborating with architect Gene Verge and his special effects man, Fred "Gabe" Gabourie, he designed a new mansion. The house had five bedrooms and quarters for six servants. It had at least 20 rooms total. The footprint was 11,000 square feet (1,000 m^{2}). The style was California Italianate. It was constructed in 1926 for $200,000 and furnished for roughly $100,000. It originally had a U-shaped driveway lined with 42 palm trees that cost $14,000. Among other unusual details was a "mechanized trout stream overhung by an aviary that followed the property line between Buster's land" and Tom Mix's house. Keaton, a fairly skilled amateur engineer, designed some of the furniture, including a mirror and dresser set for Natalie's suite of rooms. Her closet had a secret door.

The house sat on 3 acres (1.2 ha). The backyard had a 30-foot (9.1 m) "Romanesque" swimming pool. The gardens were designed by a landscaper who had previously worked for Pope Pius XII.

The house was used to shoot Parlor, Bedroom, and Bath in 1931. Buster Keaton and Natalie Talmadge divorced. He declared bankruptcy. She got the house and sold it in September 1932.

After the Keaton–Talmadges sold out, the home was later bought and sold by a chain of movie stars including Cary Grant and James Mason. Peter O'Toole and Richard Burton were roommates in the guest house in the 1950s. Pamela and James Mason, who bought the house in 1949, discovered that the home was a de facto silent movie treasure trove that had preserved copies of several important movies and at least one lost film. Keaton had edited his films in a shed on the property. When he moved out, he left behind several film prints in the padlocked shed, and there they remained, forgotten, for 30-odd years. In the 1950s the Masons sold off part of the lot, including the steps, the swimming pool, and half the driveway. Pamela Mason lived in the house by herself until 1997.

== See also ==
- The Talmadge
- Ship Café

== Sources ==
- n.a. (October 2003), Buster Keaton's Italian Villa: Then and Now, The Damfinos: The International Buster Keaton Society
- Curtis, James (2022). Buster Keaton: A Filmmaker's Life. Knopf Doubleday Publishing Group.
- Dardis, Tom (1988). Keaton, the Man who Wouldn't Lie Down. Limelight Editions.
- Higham, Charles; Moseley, Roy (1990). Cary Grant: The Lonely Heart. Avon Books.
