= United States Post Office (Hollywood, Los Angeles) =

United States historic post office

- US Post Office--Hollywood Station
- U.S. National Register of Historic Places
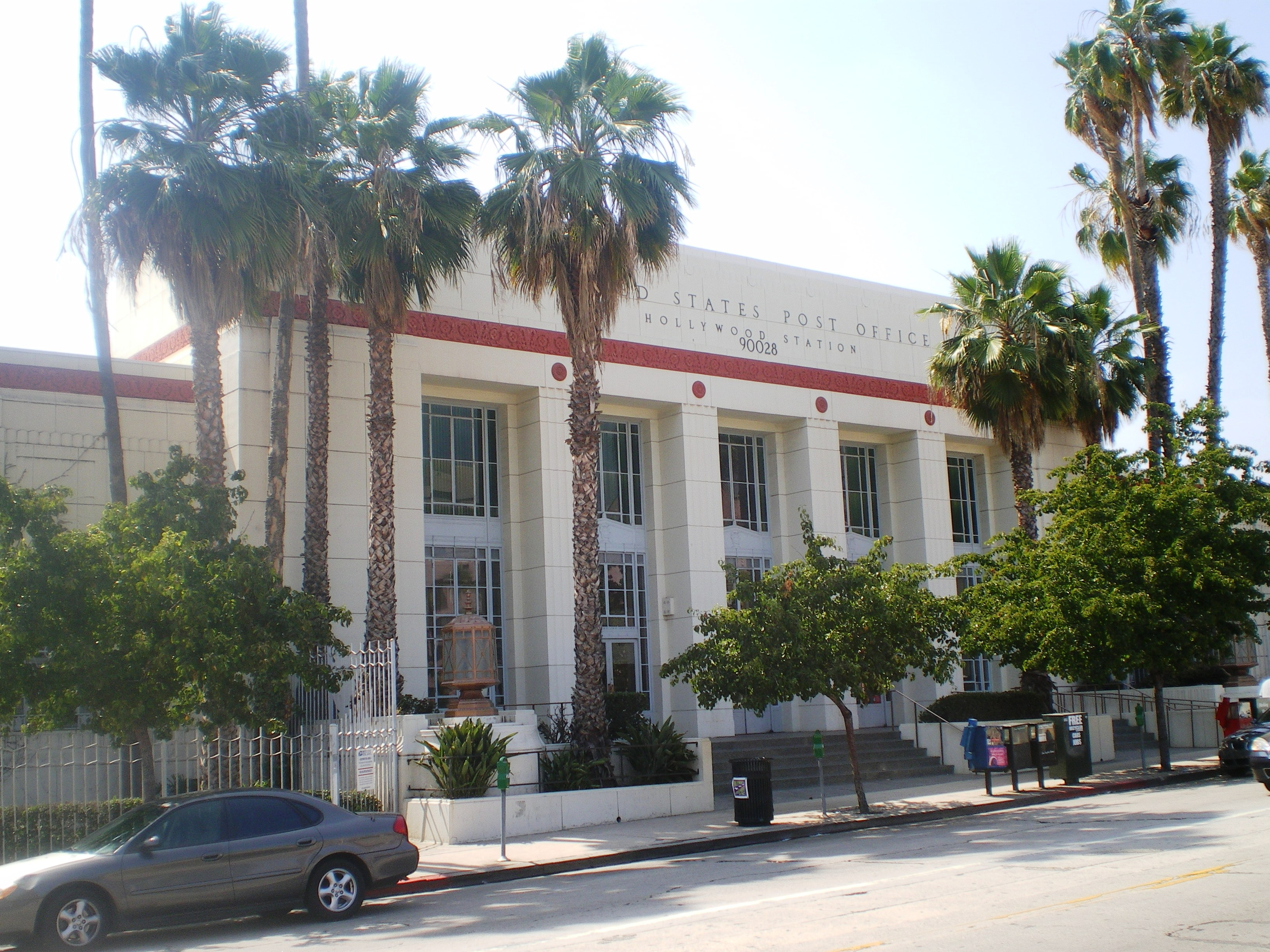
- U.S. Post Office Hollywood

- Location within the Los Angeles metropolitan area Location within California Location within the United States
- Location: 1615 N. Wilcox Ave., Los Angeles, California
- Coordinates: 34°6′0″N 118°19′50″W
- Built: 1937
- Architect: Claud Beelman
- Architectural style: Art Deco
- MPS: US Post Office in California 1900-1941 TR
- NRHP reference No.: 85000130
- Added to NRHP: January 11, 1985

The United States Post Office in Hollywood, Los Angeles, California, also known as Hollywood Station, is an active U.S. post office located at 1615 Wilcox, between Sunset and Hollywood Boulevards. It is on the National Register of Historic Places.

== Design ==
In 1937, renowned Art Deco architect Claud Beelman, a partner at Curlett + Beelman, was commissioned by the Works Progress Administration (WPA) to design the Hollywood Post Office Building. He worked with the Los Angeles architectural firm Allison & Allison. Beelman also designed the Los Angeles County Fair Gallery, also commissioned by the WPA in 1937, now known as the Millard Sheets Center for the Arts at Fairplex.

A wooden bas-relief for interior lobby, titled The Horseman, was carved by artist Gordon Newell as a Treasury Relief Art Project commission. It is still in the building, located over a doorway.

Using a steam shovel, the ground breaking was done by Will H. Hays of the Motion Picture Production Code. The post office is one of the few historic government buildings remaining relatively unchanged in Hollywood.

== See also ==
- List of Los Angeles Historic-Cultural Monuments in Hollywood
- List of Registered Historic Places in Los Angeles
- List of United States post offices
- List of New Deal sculpture
