= The Talmadge =

Historic building in Los Angeles, California, United States

- Interactive map of the The Talmadge area

General information
- Status: Completed
- Architectural style: Beaux-Arts
- Location: 3278 Wilshire Boulevard, Koreatown Los Angeles, California, U.S.
- Coordinates: 34.06151°N 118.2939°W
- Completed: 1924

Technical details
- Floor count: 11

Design and construction
- Architects: William and Alexander Curlett & Claud Beelman

The Talmadge is a historic brick residential building in Los Angeles, California and which bears the name of silent film actress Norma Talmadge.

== History ==
A house owned by Earle C. Anthony, built in 1909, was moved to Beverly Hills, California for the 1923 construction of this building. Upon its completion in 1924, it was owned by movie studio executive Joseph M. Schenck and his wife, silent actress Norma Talmadge, who was its namesake. It was designed in the style by William and Alexander Curlett & Claud Beelman.

Initially, Schenck and Talmadge resided on the 10th floor. The rest of the tenants were socialites and heirs.

== In popular culture ==
The Talmadge has been used as a filming location for numerous motion pictures and television productions.

The Talmadge was used as a filming location for two Buster Keaton films. Keaton was married to Natalie Talmadge, the sister of Norma Talmadge and Schenck was, at the time, producing Keaton's films. In Battling Butler, the entrance stands in for the main character's mansion. In Seven Chances, the interior lobby and main entrance of the building were used, briefly, at the beginning.

The exterior of The Talmadge was used as the apartment building of Steve Flood (Dean Martin) and Melanie (Lana Turner) in the 1962 Metro-Goldwyn-Mayer comedy Who's Got the Action?. The building appears repeatedly throughout the film in exterior establishing shots. It was used as a filming location for the Wachowskis' 1996 film Bound. The Talmadge was used as a filming location for the 2026 Marvel Television series Wonder Man. In Episode 2, both the interior and exterior of the building were used to depict Trevor Slattery's apartment.

== See also ==
- Buster Keaton's Italian villa
