= Garfield Building (Los Angeles) =

Coordinates: 34.04481221°N 118.25598836°W

- U.S. National Register of Historic Places
- Los Angeles Historic-Cultural Monument
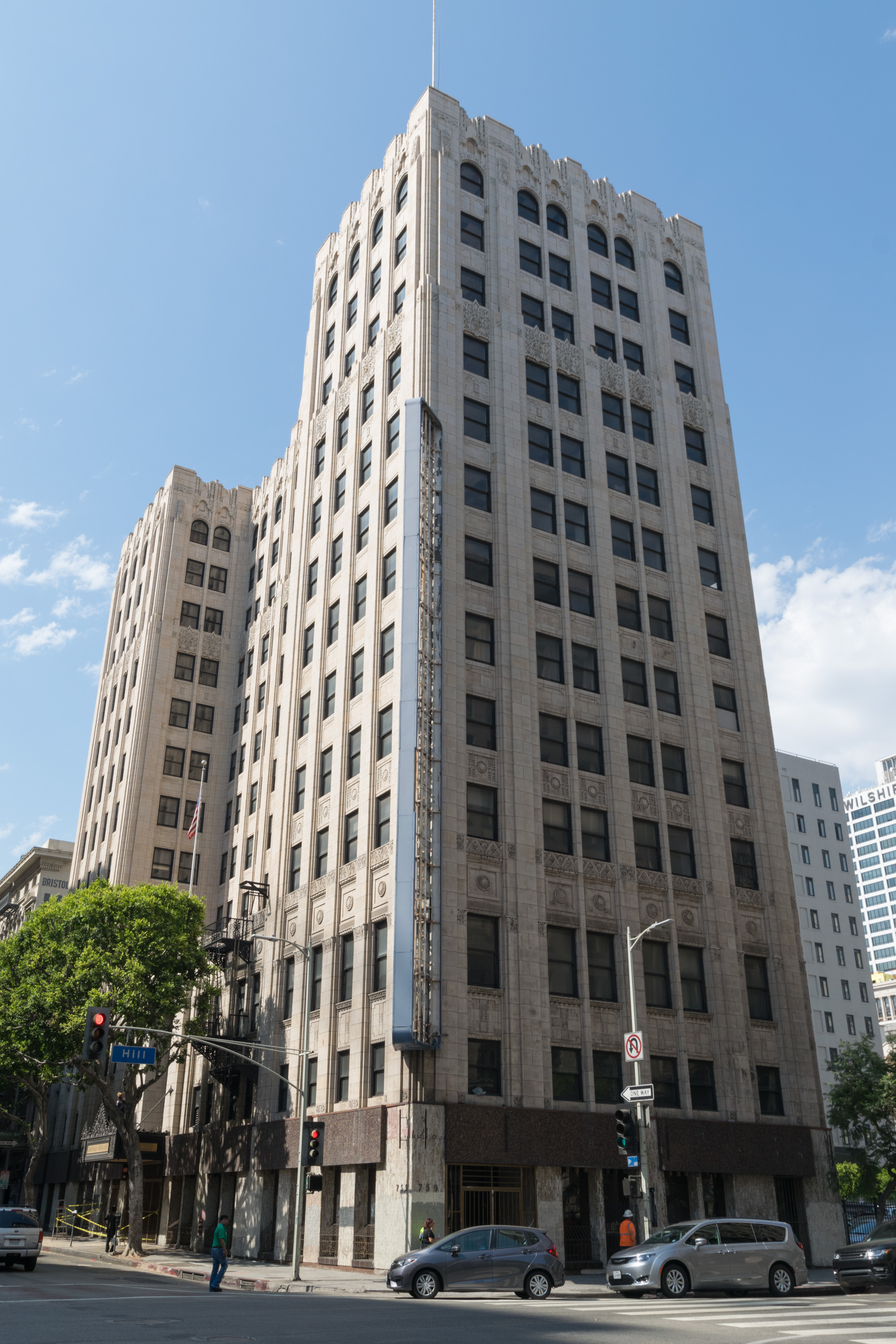
- Garfield Building, 2017
- Location: 403 W. 8th St. Los Angeles, California 90014
- Architect: Claud Beelman
- Architectural style: Art Deco
- NRHP reference No.: 82002191
- LAHCM No.: 121

Significant dates
- Added to NRHP: June 25, 1982
- Designated LAHCM: March 17, 1982

The Garfield Building is a thirteen-story Art Deco style historic structure in Los Angeles, California. Designed by American architect Claud Beelman, construction lasted from 1928 to 1930. It is listed on the National Register of Historic Places.

== Architecture and history ==
In addition to the detailed ornamentation around the street-level entry way, the Garfield Building has an art deco lobby. It was a working office building for many years, but has been empty since its sale in 1991. The building has 99,970 square feet (9,288 m^{2}) of rentable space for filming or other events. Located just off of South Hill Street at 403 West 8th Street, it is in the downtown Jewelry District, which in recent years, has had a revival, with lofts, artist's work spaces, and new shops, restaurants, and businesses around the Garfield.

The main entrance is marked by an elaborate wrought iron entrance canopy above and a terrazzo sidewalk below. Floral and grapevine patterns decorate the open grillwork above the entrance. The lobby is graced with polished nickel fittings, elegant display cases, and Gothic-style chandeliers in tones of gold and silver. The walls and floors of the lobby are clad in alternating bands of black and purple marble, and the twenty-foot lobby ceiling has a low bas relief pattern in plaster.

The building was sold in 1991 and since then has been vacant. The Los Angeles Downtown News named the building one of the "Ten Worst Eyesores" of downtown Los Angeles.

It has been declared as Los Angeles Historic-Cultural Monument No. 121.

In March 2023, the building was sold for $19 million to a Bay Area firm that plans to turn the Garfield into a boutique hotel.
