= South Park Lofts =

- Building at 816 South Grand Avenue
- U.S. National Register of Historic Places
- Los Angeles Historic-Cultural Monument
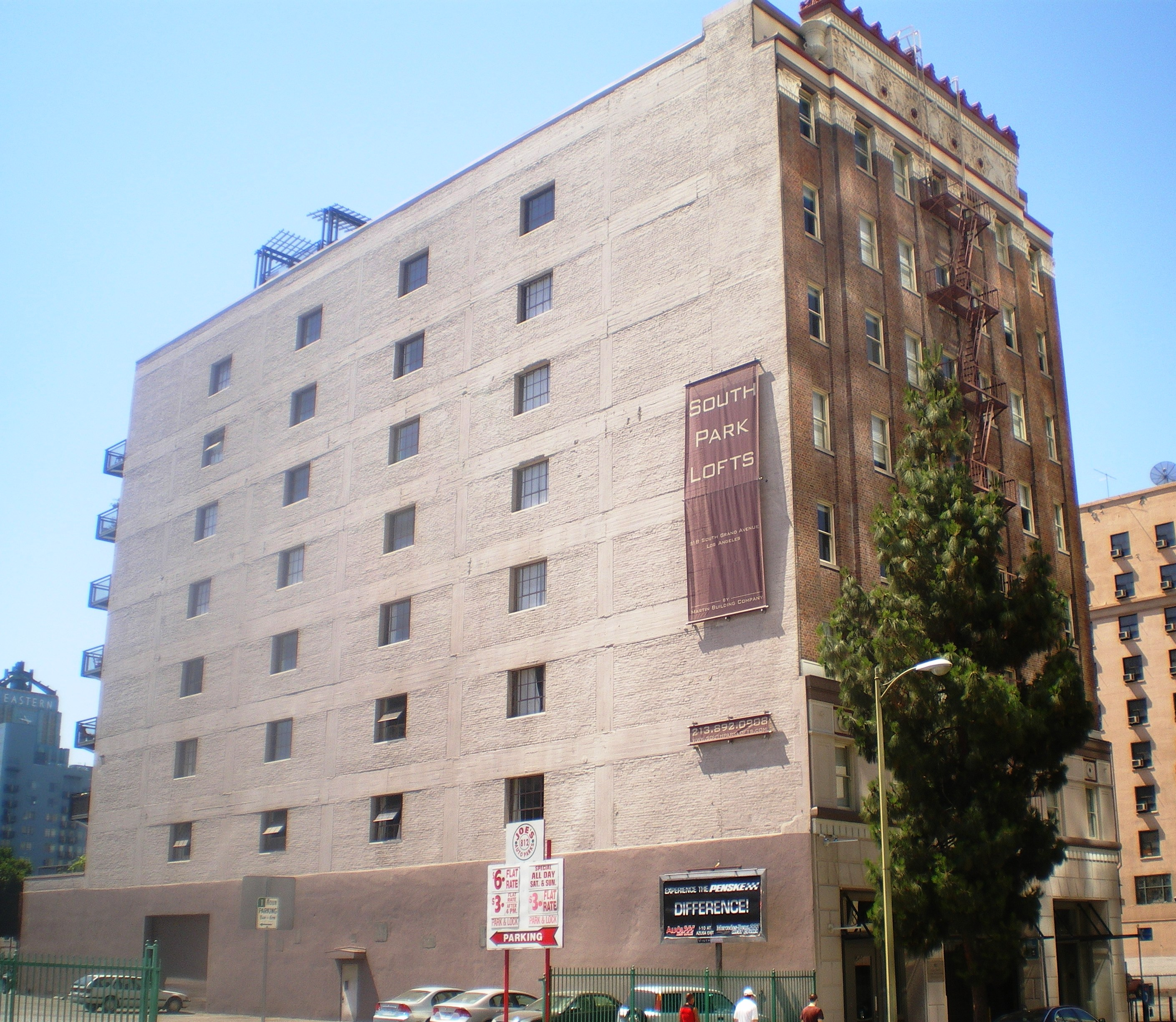
- South Park Lofts, 2008

- Location within the Los Angeles metropolitan area Location within California Location within the United States
- Location: 816 S. Grand Ave., Los Angeles, California
- Coordinates: 34°2′50″N 118°15′30″W
- Built: 1924
- Architect: Curlett, Aleck; Beelman, Claud
- Architectural style: Beaux Arts
- NRHP reference No.: 04001075
- LAHCM No.: 748
- Added to NRHP: December 2, 2004

South Park Lofts, located in downtown Los Angeles, was built in 1924 as an eight-story parking garage. It was one of America's first parking structures, and is one of the few parking garages listed in the National Register of Historic Places, having received the distinction in 2004. The building has been converted to lofts and is now known as "South Park Lofts." As "Building at 816 Grand Avenue", it is one of more than ten buildings designed by Claud Beelman listed on the National Register.

== History ==
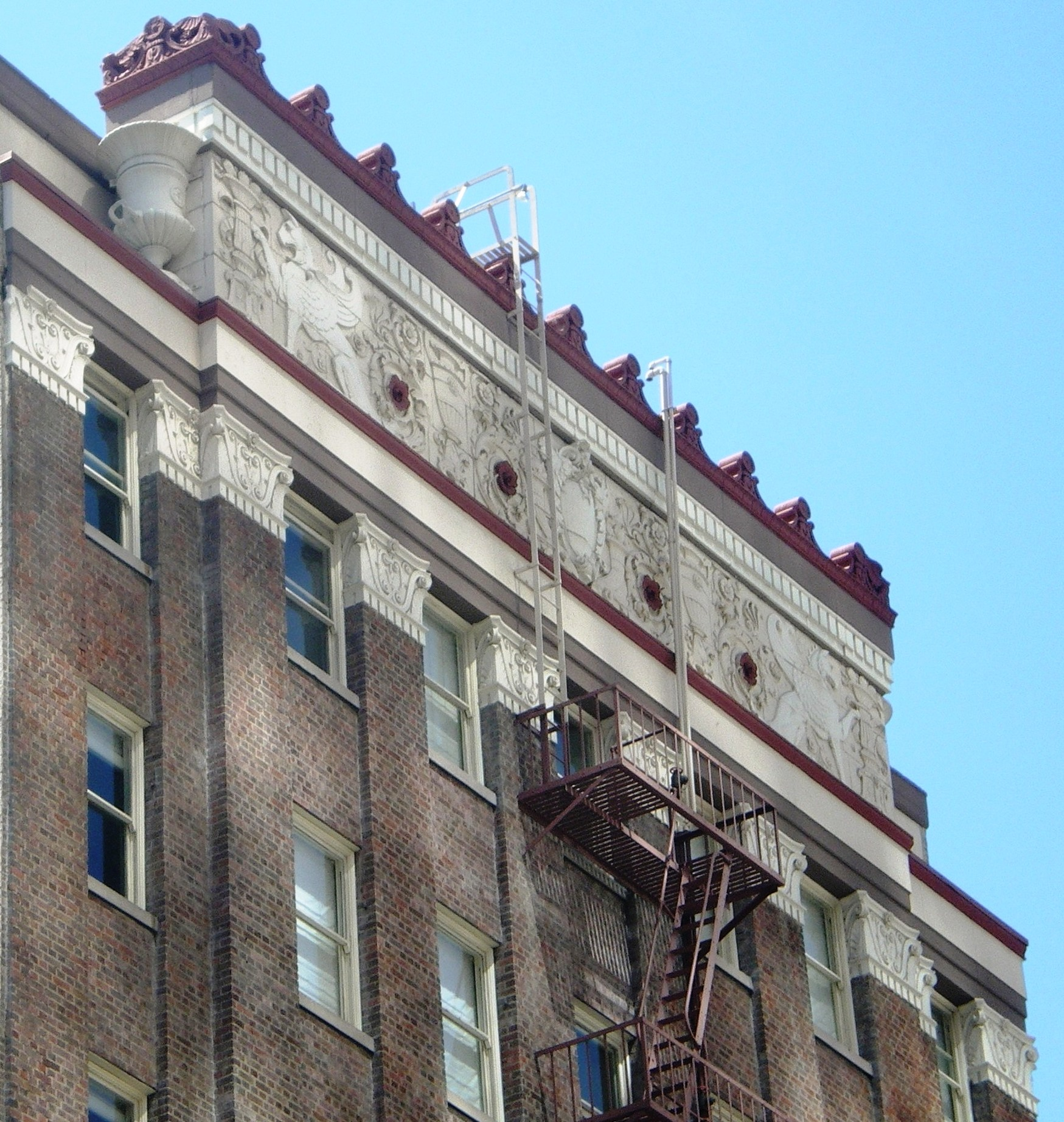
Front roofline showing Beelman's architectural detailing.

=== Beginnings ===
As the automobile took on a more prominent role in Los Angeles, traffic and parking became major problems for downtown businesses. In 1923, the Downtown Business Men's Association and Mayor George Cryer began advocating the construction of parking structures. Businessman Ken Stoakes took up the challenge and built an eight-story, 85,000-square-foot (7,900 m^{2}) parking garage on Grand Avenue. Stoakes hired one of the city's most prominent architects, Claud Beelman. Beelman and Stoakes sought to create a structure that had continuity with the office buildings, hotels and department stores that lined Grand Avenue. Accordingly, Beelman designed a Beaux Arts edifice with windows and decorative details typical of other commercial buildings of the 1920s.

Stoakes' garage opened to much fanfare in 1924. Stoakes promoted the safety and security of his "fireproof garage". In an interview with the Los Angeles Times during the 1925 holiday shopping season, Stoakes said: "Parking along the curb downtown is bad enough at best. With the frantic attempt of thousands of Christmas shoppers to squeeze in the already available jammed parking space, it is almost suicidal to the appearance of any respectable-looking car".

Through the 1920s and 1930s, the garage was used by Bullock's department store, with uniformed attendants picking up and dropping off shoppers' cars. Shoppers could park two hours for free at Stoakes' structure with a $1 purchase at Bullocks.

=== Conversion to other uses ===
The structure was purchased by Pacific Telephone & Telegraph Co. in 1950. Used initially for employee parking, it was later converted to use for storage and offices. The building subsequently went through several changes of ownership and was used for many years as an office building.

The building was acquired by Martin Building Co. in 2002 and converted into 49 upscale lofts at a cost of $10 million. The key to the adaptive use of the building was in its unusually narrow lot and design. Many older parking structures were built with ramps and sloped floors. Stoakes' garage, on the other hand, was situated on a narrow lot that left no room for ramps. Accordingly, Beelman designed the garage around a huge freight elevator that could lift two cars at once. When the building became lofts, the rooftop housing for the elevator motor was converted into a small gymnasium for residents.

=== Historic designation ===
In August 2004, the California Historic Resources Commission granted historic landmark status to the building. Eight months later, it was recognized by the United States Department of the Interior as "one of America's first parking structures to be listed on the National Register of Historic Places". It is one of more than ten buildings designed by Claud Beelman listed on the National Register.

== See also ==
- List of Registered Historic Places in Los Angeles
