= United California Bank Building (Los Angeles) =

Historic building in Los Angeles, California

United California Bank
- Location within the Los Angeles metropolitan area

General information
- Location: Los Angeles, California, 600 S. Spring Street, Los Angeles, California
- Coordinates: 34.0456°N 118.2509°W
- Groundbreaking: 1958
- Completed: 1961
- Renovated: 1985, 2008
- Cost: $15.5 million ($171 million in 2025)

Height
- Height: 267 feet (81 m)

Technical details
- Floor count: 18, 19, or 20
- Floor area: 300,000 square feet (28,000 m^{2})

Design and construction
- Architect: Claud Beelman

United California Bank, also known as SB Tower, is a historic building located at 600 S. Spring Street, on the corner of 6th and Spring, in downtown Los Angeles, California. It was Los Angeles's first skyscraper constructed after the city's building height limit was rescinded and upon completion, it was the tallest commercial building in the city.

== History ==
Groundbreaking for United California Bank occurred in 1958 and the building was completed in 1961. The architect was Claud Beelman and the cost of construction was $15.5 million ($171 million in 2025). The building was the first skyscraper built after the city's 150 feet (46 m) building height limit was rescinded and upon completion, it was the tallest commercial building in Los Angeles.

United California Bank originally owned and occupied the building. The company moved out in 1973 as they followed the financial district's shift to Bunker Hill. In 1979, the Spring Street Financial District was added to the National Register of Historic Places, with United California Bank listed as a non-contributing property in the district. United California Bank sold the building for more than $23 million in 1981 ($81.5 million in 2025).

The building was modernized in 1985 at a cost of $3.5 million ($10.5 million in 2025). It was converted to residential apartments in 2008.

== Architecture and design ==
United California Bank is a concrete and glass structure that features a contemporary 1960s design. It is 267 feet (81 m) in height, consists of 18, 19, or 20 floors, and contains 300,000 square feet (28,000 m^{2}) of floorspace.
