= First Interstate Bancorp =

Defunct American bank holding company

- Trade name: First Interstate Bank
- Formerly: Firstamerica Corporation (1958–1961); Western Bancorporation (1961–1981)
- Type: Public
- Traded as: NYSE: I
- Predecessor: Spun off from Transamerica Corporation in 1958
- Founded: July 1, 1958; 68 years ago in Los Angeles, California
- Defunct: April 1, 1996; 30 years ago First Interstate BancSystem
- Headquarters: Los Angeles, California

First Interstate Bancorp was a bank holding company based in the United States. Headquartered in Los Angeles, it was the nation's eighth largest banking company.

Although First Interstate Bancorp was taken over by Wells Fargo in 1996, the name (along with the company logo) has continued to be used in the banking world by First Interstate BancSystem, who has been using the name under a franchise agreement since 1984.

== History ==
In 1928, Amadeo Giannini, born in California to Italian immigrant parents, formed a holding company, the Transamerica Corporation, to consolidate his existing financial ventures, which began business with $1.1 billion in assets and both banking and non-banking activities. From the 1930s through the mid-1950s, Transamerica made a number of acquisitions of banks and other financial corporations throughout the western United States, creating the framework for the later First Interstate system.

In 1953, regulators succeeded in forcing the separation of Transamerica Corporation and Bank of America under the Clayton Antitrust Act. Transamerica Corporation, a Delaware corporation, petitioned this court to review an order of the Board of Governors of the Federal Reserve System entered against it under Section 11 of the Clayton Act, 15 U.S.C.A. § 21, to enforce compliance with Section 7 of the Act, 15 U.S.C.A. § 18.

The Bank Holding Company Act of 1956 placed new restrictions on companies such as Transamerica. Thus Transamerica's banking operations, which included 23 banks in 11 western states, were spun off as Firstamerica Corporation in 1958. Transamerica continued to pursue its insurance and other operations.

Firstamerica (doing business as First Western Bank and Trust Company) changed its name to Western Bancorporation in 1961, and the retail operations were renamed United California Bank (UCB), after the acquisition of Los Angeles-based California Bank, which operated primarily in Southern California. In large part to compete with Bank of America (by far the largest bank in California at the time), Western expanded steadily in the 1960s, both domestically and overseas, ending the decade with assets of more than $10 billion. The bank's financial services network grew through the 1974 founding of the Western Bancorporation Mortgage Company and the 1979 formation of Western Bancorp Venture Capital Company.

During the 1960s, 1970s, and 1980s Western Bancorporation operated in California under the UCB brand. In the early 1970s, noticing Bank of America's (BofA) successful credit card BankAmericard, UCB decided to offer its own card which would be issued locally by individual banks under the name "Master Charge," Later, when BofA spun off its franchised credit card operations to a separate organization named Visa International and changed the card's name to "Visa," UCB did the same thing, spinning off Master Charge to Master Card International and changing the name to MasterCard.

In 1970, their affiliated bank, United California Bank of Basel, Switzerland collapsed after unauthorized trades in cocoa and silver futures. Several of the bank's officers, including President Paul Erdman spent time in jail on fraud charges.

In June 1981 the company changed its name to First Interstate Bancorp. The First Interstate name became a systemwide brand for most of the company's banks, thus promoting greater public recognition of the company and internal consistency. During the 1980s, in addition to acquiring more banks, First Interstate jumped into new areas of financial services as the deregulation of the banking industry progressed. In 1983 the First Interstate Discount Brokerage was set up to provide bank customers with securities and commodities support. In 1984 the bank branched into merchant banking with the purchase of Continental Illinois Ltd. and equipment leasing with the acquisition of the Commercial Alliance Corporation of New York, and broadened its mortgage banking activities by acquiring the Republic Realty Mortgage Corporation. In 1986 and 1987, First Interstate attempted a $3.2 billion hostile takeover of the ailing Bank of America, but the bid was defeated. Undaunted, First Interstate acquired Allied Bancshares, a Houston based bank.

First Interstate ran into its own troubles in the late 1980s and early 1990s stemming from bad real estate loans and the severe recession in California. The bank posted losses in the hundreds of millions for 1987, 1989, and 1991. Consequently, First Interstate concentrated on rebuilding and rejuvenating its existing operations rather than acquiring new ones. A number of noncore unprofitable subsidiaries were jettisoned, including the equipment leasing unit, a government securities operation, and most of the wholesale banking unit. Rumors of a takeover of First Interstate were rife in the early 1990s before the bank recovered fully by mid-decade under the leadership of Chairman and CEO Edward M. Carson (1929–2010). In 1994, they acquired 15 branches in Washington from the failed Great American Bank.

Despite First Interstate's healthier condition, and with the banking industry consolidation in full swing, Wells Fargo made a hostile bid for First Interstate in October 1995 initially valued at $10.8 billion. Other banks came forward as potential 'white knights,' including Norwest Corporation, Bank One Corporation, and First Bank System. The latter made a serious bid for First Interstate, with the two banks reaching a formal merger agreement in November valued initially at $10.3 billion. But First Bank ran into regulatory difficulties with the way it had structured its offer and was forced to bow out of the takeover battle in mid-January 1996. Talks between Wells Fargo and First Interstate then led within days to a merger agreement for $11.3 billion in stock. Wells Fargo completed the acquisition on April 1, 1996 and announced the elimination of 7,200 jobs.

First Interstate Bancorp's stock was traded on the New York Stock Exchange under the stock symbol "I".

In 1984, First Interstate BancSystem of Montana entered into a franchise agreement with First Interstate Bancorp of California to use the First Interstate Bank name and logo. In 1996 when First Interstate Bancorp was split up, the Montana organization successfully negotiated to retain the well known First Interstate name and logo. The current First Interstate BancSystem continues to operate 306 locations in 14 states as of 2023 in chiefly the northern Great Plains and Rocky Mountain regions.

=== 1986 Hollywood heist ===
In June 1986, a highly trained group, called the "Hole in the Ground" crew by the media, tunneled under the First Interstate Bank in Hollywood at Spaulding Avenue and Sunset Boulevard through an extensive network of tunnels over the course of several months and took about US$270,000 (equivalent to $790,000 in 2025) in cash and the contents of 36 safe deposit boxes valued at US$2,500,000 (equivalent to $7,300,000 in 2025). The group rode all-terrain vehicles through the underground storm drain system of Los Angeles, and used gas-powered generators, hammer drills, power saws, and digging equipment to tunnel 100 ft (30 m) up into the bank's vault.

=== 1992 Victorville heist ===
On January 24, 1992, four robbers wearing boiler suits and ski mask and brandishing AK-47s broke into the Interstate Bank in Victorville across the street from the mall. The robbers ran off with US$331,951 (equivalent to $761,590 in 2025) in cash and lead the Victorville Police in the longest high speed chase at the time. Two hours after the robbery the police arrested Gerry Edward Alexander, getaway driver Jon Harrington, and robbers Anthony Hicks and Willie Harris. They were eventually sentenced to 30 years in prison. This robbery is the subject of crime drama Rescue 911 and was shown in the episode of the same name.

== See also ==
- United California Bank Building (Los Angeles)
- Aon Center (Los Angeles)
- U.S. Bank Tower (Los Angeles)
- Wells Fargo Center (Portland, Oregon) – named First Interstate Tower 1981–1996
- United California Bank robbery
