= Claud Beelman =

American architect (1884–1963)

- Born: 1884; Ohio
- Died: January 30, 1963 (aged 78–79); Los Angeles, California
- Citizenship: USA
- Occupation: Architect
- Spouse: Lourene Taft Beelman
- Children: 1 daughter
- Awards: Honorary Doctor of Architecture from Woodbury University, May 12, 2023
- Buildings: Superior Oil Company Building

Claud W. Beelman (1884 – January 30, 1963), sometimes known as Claude Beelman, was an American architect who designed many examples of Beaux-Arts, Art Deco, and Streamline Moderne style buildings. Many of his buildings are listed on the National Register of Historic Places.

== Biography ==
Beelman was married to Lourene Taft Beelman (b. 1884, Ohio - d. 1948, Ca.). In 1910, he was a draftsman in the state of Indiana. (Cite: U.S. Census Records, State of Indiana, 1910.) It was there they had a daughter, Helen Beelman (b. 1912). By the 1920s, the family had relocated to Los Angeles, and by 1930, they lived in Beverly Hills.

From the 1920s on, Beelman, as partner or owner of one or another of several firms (Curlett + Beelman; Allison & Allison; Ruck & Beelman; Claud Beelman & Associates) designed a number of prominent civic and private structures. By 1956, Claude Beelman & Associates officed at 7421 Beverly Blvd., Los Angeles 90036.

When he was in his seventies, Beelman designed the 12-story Superior Oil building for oil tycoon W.M. Keck. Completed in 1955, the Superior Oil building later became The Bank of California Building, and was used for the bank's offices until the 1980s. By the late 1990s, the building had been vacant for nearly ten years, but has been renovated beginning in 2000 by hotel developer Andre Balazs, and now is the location of his hotel The Standard.

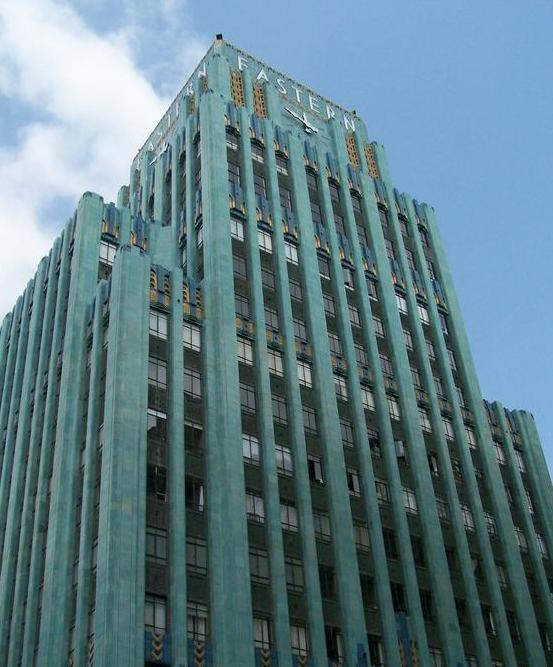
Eastern Columbia Building

It is the Eastern Columbia Building, however, with its facade of turquoise green terra cotta tile, ornate clock tower, art deco lighting, fixtures, signage and architectural detail that is considered Beelman's most recognizable work. In 2006, the Eastern Columbia Building was converted from office space to loft live/work spaces by the Kor Group and is now seen as one of the most desirable loft buildings in Downtown Los Angeles.

On May 12, 2023, Beelman was posthumously awarded an Honorary Doctor of Architecture from Woodbury University in Burbank, California.

== Works ==
Beelman's works include (in Los Angeles, California) unless otherwise noted:

=== National Register of Historic Places ===
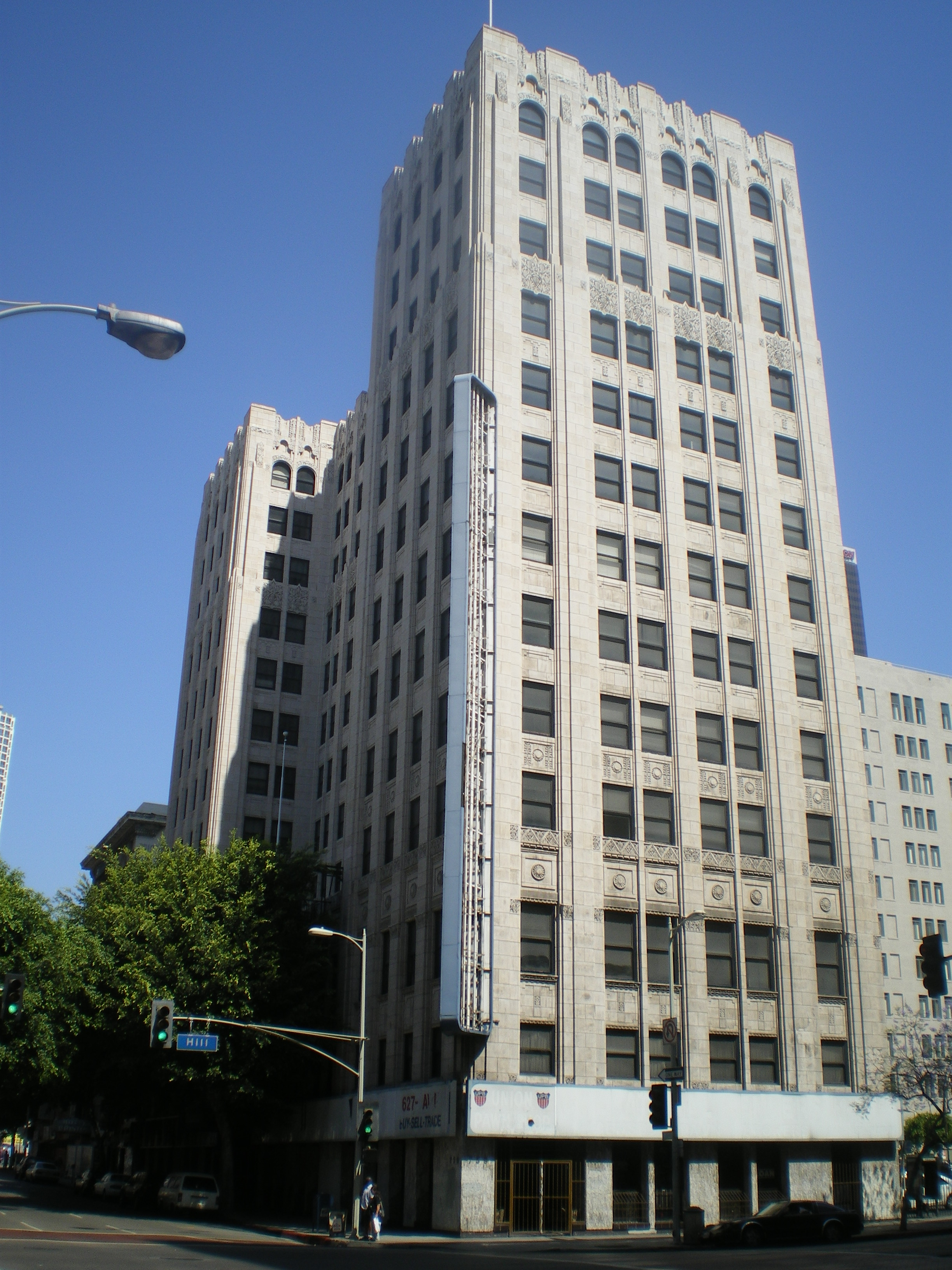
Garfield Building, 2008

- Cooper Arms Apartments (1923), Long Beach, California
- Building at 816 South Grand Avenue (1924)
- Culver Hotel (1924), Culver City, California
- Roosevelt Building (1926)
- Security Building (1928), Phoenix, Arizona
- Heinsbergen Decorating Company Building (1928)
- Ninth and Broadway Building (1929)
- Board of Trade Building (1929)
- Garfield Building (1930)
- Eastern Columbia Building (1930)
- U.S. Post Office--Hollywood Station (1937)
- Superior Oil Company Building (1956)
- Norwalk Memorial Hospital, Norwalk, Ohio
- Spring Street Realty Building
- Woodbury University, Wilshire Boulevard Building

=== Other notable works ===
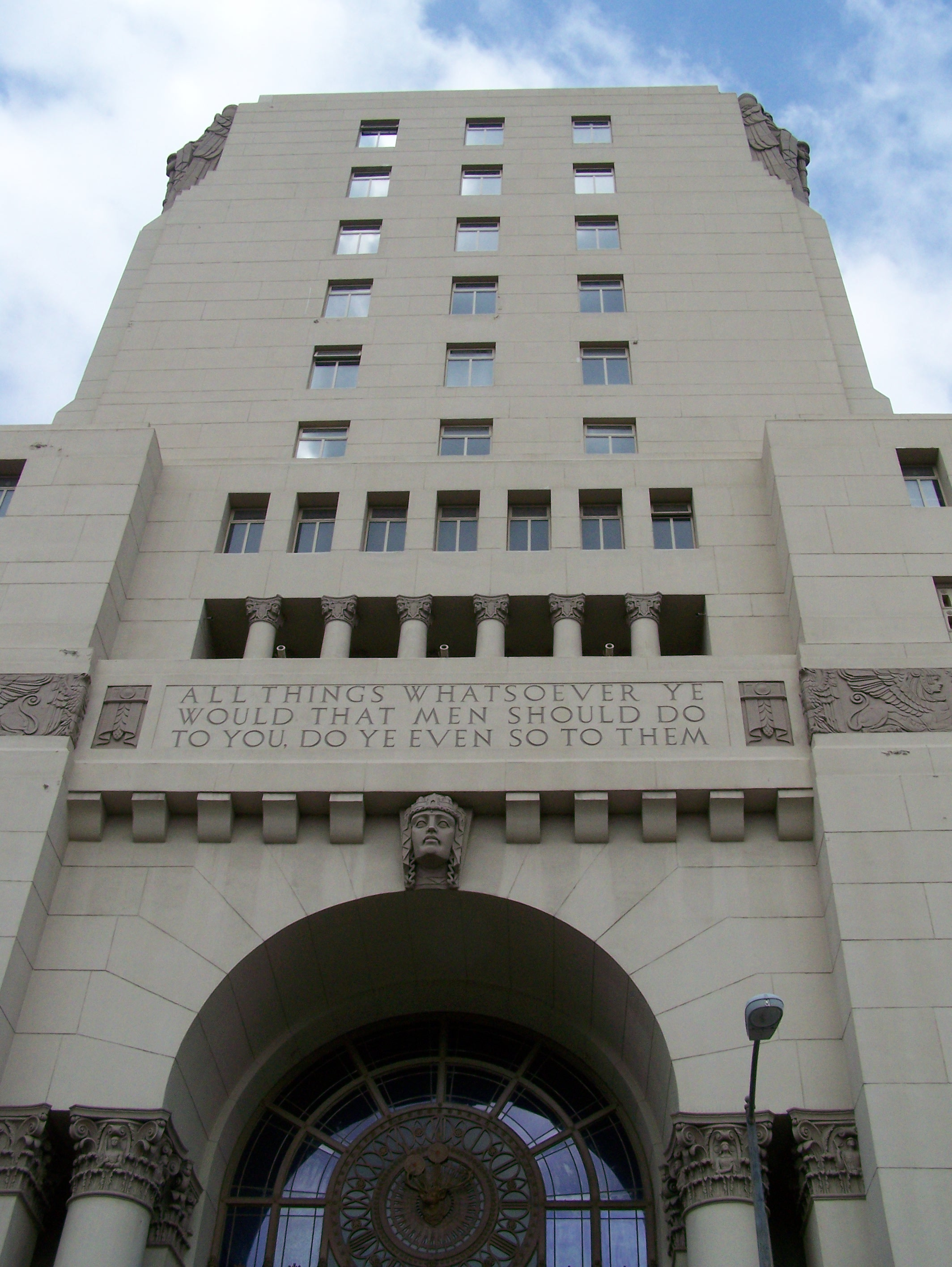
Elks Lodge No. 99 / Park Plaza Hotel

- The Talmadge (1924)
- Elks Lodge No. 99 / Park Plaza Hotel (1924)
- May Company Garage (1926)
- Don Lee Mutual Broadcast Building (1948)
- Tidewater Building (1958)
- United California Bank Building (1959)
- Getty Building (1963)
- Central Plaza Building
- Farmers and Merchants Bank Office Tower, Long Beach, California
- Irving Thalberg Building, MGM (Sony) Studios
- L.A. Jewelry Center
- Pacific South West Trust Building
- Rose Hill Housing Structure
