= Security Building (Phoenix, Arizona) =

- U.S. National Register of Historic Places
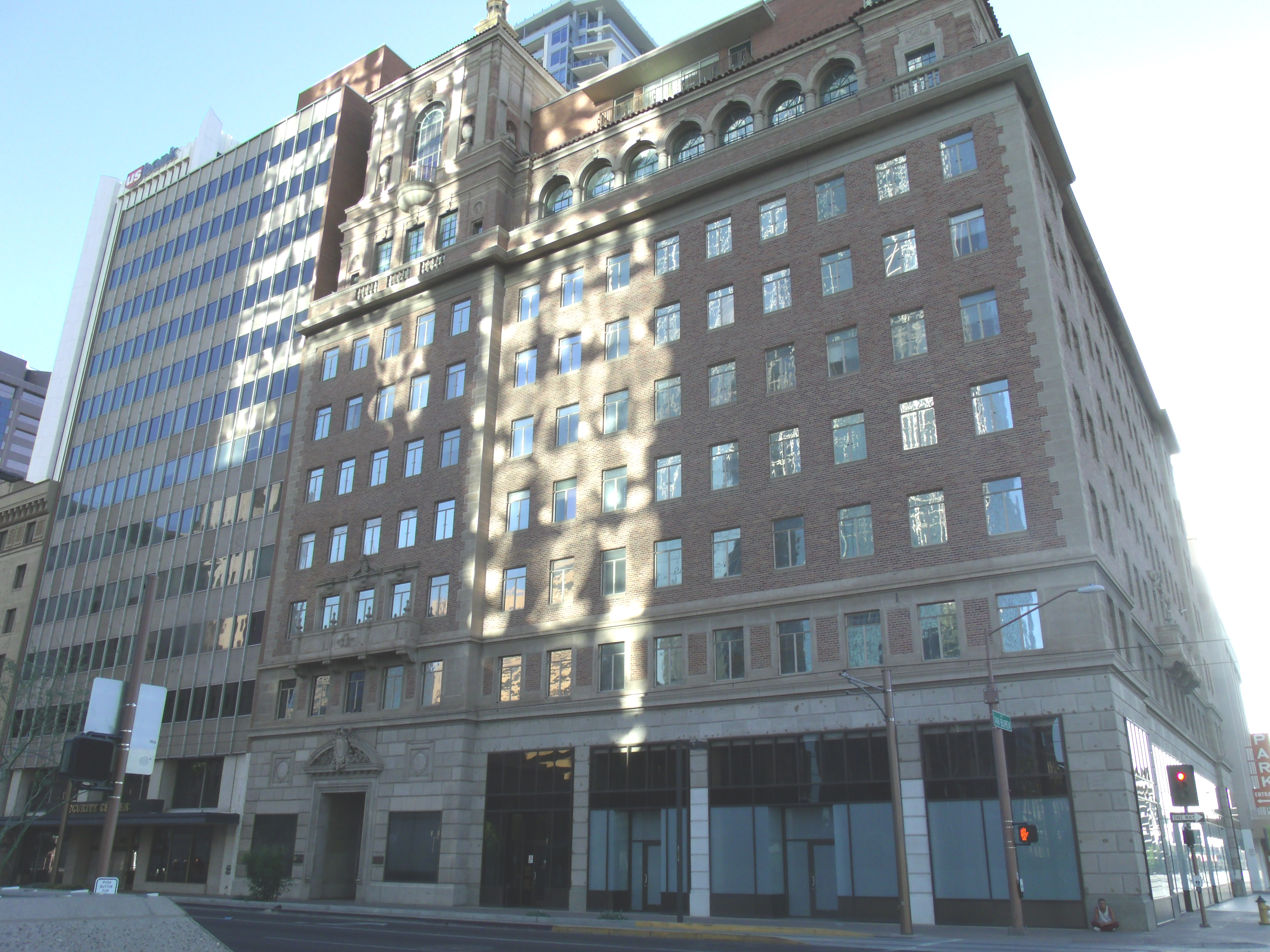
- The penthouse level was built for Walter Bimson

- Location within Arizona Location within the United States
- Location: 234 N. Central Avenue, Phoenix, Arizona
- Coordinates: 33°27′4″N 112°4′24″W
- Area: less than one acre
- Built: 1928
- Built by: Edwards, Wildley & Dixon
- Architect: Curlett & Beelman
- Architectural style: Second Renaissance Revival
- MPS: Phoenix Commercial MRA
- NRHP reference No.: 85002081 (original); 100013013 (increase)

Significant dates
- Added to NRHP: September 12, 1985
- Boundary increase: May 18, 2026

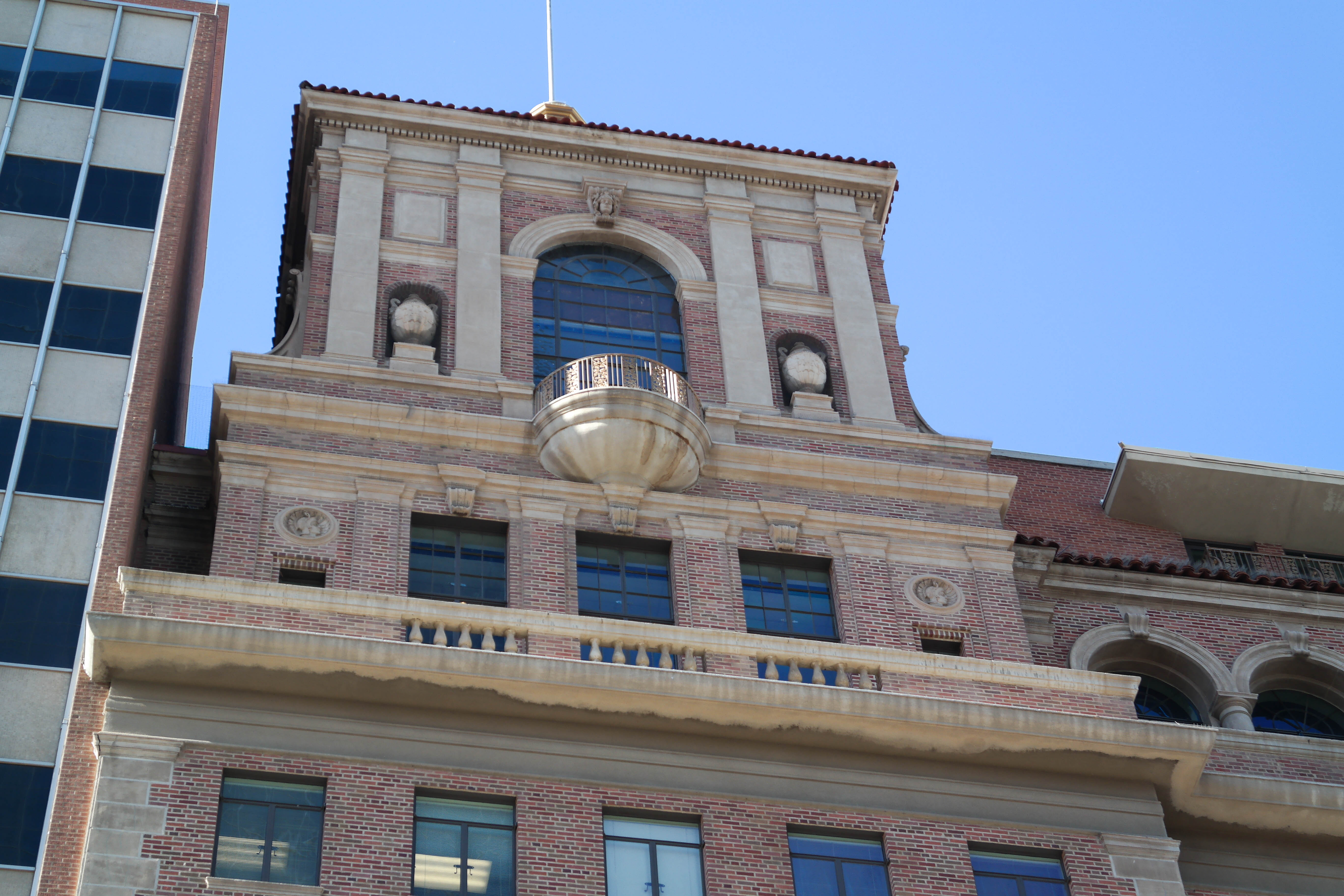
The Walter Bimson penthouse

The Security Building is a building in downtown Phoenix, Arizona, completed in 1928 and listed on the National Register of Historic Places in 1985.

== History ==
The Security Building was constructed for the Security Improvement Company, whose President was prominent Phoenix realtor Dwight B. Heard. From 1897 until his 1929 death, Heard was one of the most powerful men in the state, owning an investment company, a cattle company, and the Arizona Republican newspaper. The building would serve as a headquarters for produce growers and law firms over the years.

In 1958, the ninth-floor penthouse apartment was added, serving as the home of Walter R. Bimson, the chairman of the successful Valley National Bank of Arizona.

In 2001, Maricopa County acquired the property, and historical renovations began in 2005 to restore the building. The Security Building currently houses county offices; the Arizona State University Phoenix Urban Research Laboratory occupied the former penthouse until May 2012.

== Architecture ==
The building was designed by Curlett & Beelman, with regional contractors Edwards, Wildey and Dixon constructing the building. The Security Building is an example of Second Renaissance Revival architecture, using copper and hand-molded bricks. The structure uses reinforced concrete, while the interior includes marble floors and walls, as well as brass elevator doors.
