= Who's Got the Action? =

1962 film by Daniel Mann

- Theatrical release poster
- Directed by: Daniel Mann
- Screenplay by: Jack Rose
- Based on: Four Horse Players Are Missing by Alexander Rose
- Produced by: Jack Rose
- Starring: Dean Martin; Lana Turner; Eddie Albert; Walter Matthau; Paul Ford; Nita Talbot
- Cinematography: Joseph Ruttenberg
- Edited by: Howard A. Smith
- Music by: George Duning
- Distributed by: Paramount Pictures
- Release date: December 25, 1962
- Running time: 93 minutes
- Country: United States
- Language: English
- Box office: $1.6 million (US and Canada rentals)

Who's Got the Action? is a 1962 American comedy film directed by Daniel Mann, from a screenplay by Jack Rose, based on the novel Four Horse Players Are Missing by Alexander Rose. It stars Dean Martin and Lana Turner, with Eddie Albert, Walter Matthau, Paul Ford and Nita Talbot. The film focuses on a man suffering from an addiction to gambling.

== Plot ==
The gambling habit of lawyer Steve Flood is beginning to get on the nerves of his wife Melanie, who initially suspects him of marital infidelity. When she learns about the gambling, Melanie talks Steve's law partner Clint Morgan, an old flame, into helping her act as a fictitious horse-race bookie offering unusually attractive terms to clients.

The plan is for Steve to lose enough money to permanently rid him of the betting habit, but it goes awry when he suddenly begins winning bets on a few long-shot horses. Flood's winning streak attracts the attention of two horse-playing judges, Boatwright and Fogel, who persuade Flood to place bets for them with his mysterious "bookie". Melanie and Morgan are astounded when the judges begin winning large wagers as well.

The make-believe bookmaking activity arouses the ire of syndicate mobster Tony Gagouts, who is furious and wants to know who is "getting the action". Gagouts's mistress, a nightclub singer named Saturday Knight, happens to be the Floods' next-door neighbor, and assists Melanie in raising cash for the gambling payoffs by purchasing various furnishings from the Floods' apartment (using Gagouts's ill-gotten money).

The source of the mysterious "bookmaking" is traced to the Floods' apartment by Gagouts through an illegal telephone wiretap. He and a team of thugs descend on the apartment, where they are surprised to find all the defecting gamblers assembled. They are thunderstruck when a coercive interrogation reveals that Melanie Flood is the "bookie" who they have been seeking.

Steve Flood ultimately convinces Gagouts to forgive all of their gambling debts by arguing that only by marrying his mistress Saturday can he avoid the risk of incriminating testimony. In one stroke, this fulfills Saturday's long-sought goal, saves the Floods' marriage, insulates Gagouts from future prosecution and clears Melanie's $18,000 gambling payoff burden.

== Cast ==
- Dean Martin as Steve Flood
- Lana Turner as Melanie Flood
- Eddie Albert as Clint Morgan
- Walter Matthau as Tony Gagouts
- Paul Ford as Judge Boatwright
- Nita Talbot as Saturday Knight
- John McGiver as Judge Fogel
- Jack Albertson as Hodges

== Production notes ==
The storyline is based on the novel Four Horse Players Are Missing (1960) by Alexander Rose, who also plays a minor role in the film (as Mr. Goody). This novel, in turn, was closely related to Damon Runyon's short story Little Miss Marker.

Many of the scenes were filmed on-location in and outside of the luxurious penthouse apartments in the historic Talmadge building on Los Angeles's Wilshire Boulevard.
