= William O. Jenkins House =

- “The Phantom House”
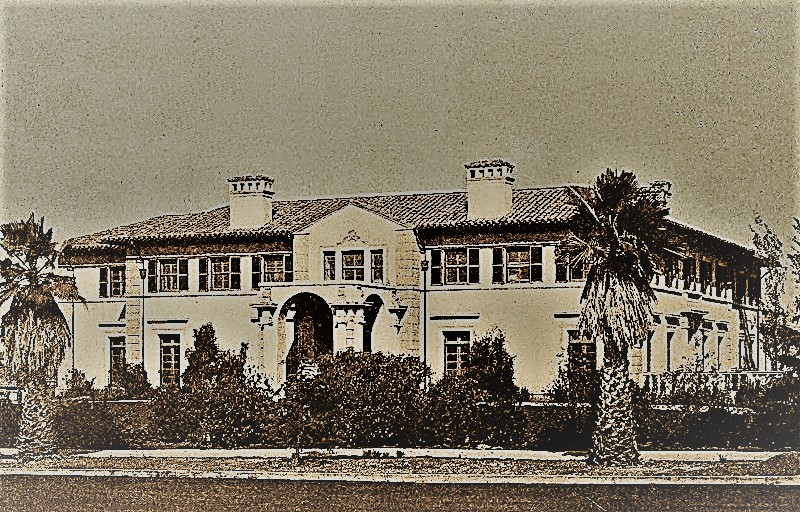
- Alternative names: J. Paul Getty Mansion

General information
- Type: Residence
- Architectural style: Mediterranean Revival, Renaissance Revival
- Location: Los Angeles, California, 641 South Irving Boulevard (intersection of Crenshaw and Wilshire Boulevards), Windsor Square, Los Angeles, US
- Coordinates: 34.0622°N 118.3189°W
- Groundbreaking: 1922
- Completed: 1923 (or ’25)
- Opened: 1925
- Demolished: 1957
- Cost: $250,000 (in 1923)

Technical details
- Material: Steel, concrete, brick-lined interior
- Floor count: Two

Design and construction
- Architect: T. Beverley Keim
- Main contractor: William A. Larkin

Other information
- Number of rooms: (14 bedrooms)

The William O. Jenkins House— also known as the "Phantom House", the J. Paul Getty mansion and 641 South Irving Boulevard — was a Mediterranean-style property in Los Angeles, California, built for businessman William O. Jenkins (reputedly the "richest man in Mexico") in 1922 and '23. Although razed in 1957, it lives on in movie memory owing to its use in location shooting for two celebrated Hollywood films — Sunset Boulevard (1950) and Rebel Without a Cause (1955). The house was demolished in 1957 to make way for the new Tidewater Building.

== History ==
The house was designed by American civil engineer and architect Thomas Beverley Keim, Jr. (1884-1926), who committed suicide soon after its completion. It cost $250,000 ($4,546,523 in 2025 dollars). Jenkins, a wealthy American expatriate living in Mexico, lived at the residence with his family for only one year (1925-26). It then sat vacant for a decade, prompting locals to dub the impressive edifice the "Phantom House". It was sold to oil magnate J. Paul Getty (1892–1976) in 1936. The home was occupied by one of the five (former) Mrs. Gettys at the time of the 1950 filming of Sunset Boulevard by Paramount Studios. As a condition for the rental of the property, she requested that the studio build her a new swimming pool, which became the site of the famous scene with William Holden's floating corpse at the beginning of the film. The house was two blocks west of Hollywood favorite restaurant Perino's on Wilshire Boulevard.

On 21 February 1955, Warner Brothers was granted permission — for the sum of $250 per day ($3,005 in 2025 dollars) — to film scenes for Rebel Without a Cause on the site on April 16, 18, 20 and 21, 1955. The same swimming pool, now dry, was again used extensively. The shoot was a rushed affair because the crew and owner anticipated demolition at any time. Having only recently won a lawsuit brought by 169 of his Windsor Square neighbors (which had sought to prevent demolition), Getty was keen to have the place destroyed before the locals had a chance to successfully seek alternative legal avenues. Mrs. Getty then sold the property in 1957 to the developers of the present white marble high rise office building known as the Tidewater Oil Building (1958).

Another nearby former Getty property — at 605 South Irving Boulevard — also known as the "Getty House", is a 1920s Tudor Revival mansion and is the official home of the mayor of Los Angeles. It was given to the city by J.P. Getty's son, George.
