= William O. Jenkins =

Guillermo Oscar Jenkins (1878–1963) was an American-Mexican businessman who became one of the wealthiest men in Mexico of his time. He was born May 18, 1878, in Shelbyville, Tennessee. He was originally a mechanic who moved to Monterrey, Mexico. He served during the Mexican Revolution as a minor consular official at Puebla, Mexico. While serving as consul, he was kidnapped by revolutionary forces and held for ransom. Once released he was arrested for allegedly arranging the kidnapping, but he was never convicted of such actions. He was active by turns in hosiery, sugar, theaters and banking. He was a leading role in the founding of Bancomer.

== See also ==
- William O. Jenkins House

== Sources ==
- Time Magazine: Meet Mr. Jenkins (subscription required)
- Account of siege of Puebla by William O. Jenkins
- The Mexico Reader: History, Culture, Politics. Edited by Gilbert M. Joseph and Timothy J. Henderson ISBN 978-0822330424
- Jenkins of Mexico-How a Southern Farm Boy Became a Mexican Magnate: History, Culture, Politics. Written by Andrew Paxman ISBN 0190455748
