= Eastern Columbia Building =

Building in Los Angeles, California

- U.S. Historic district – Contributing property
- Los Angeles Historic-Cultural Monument
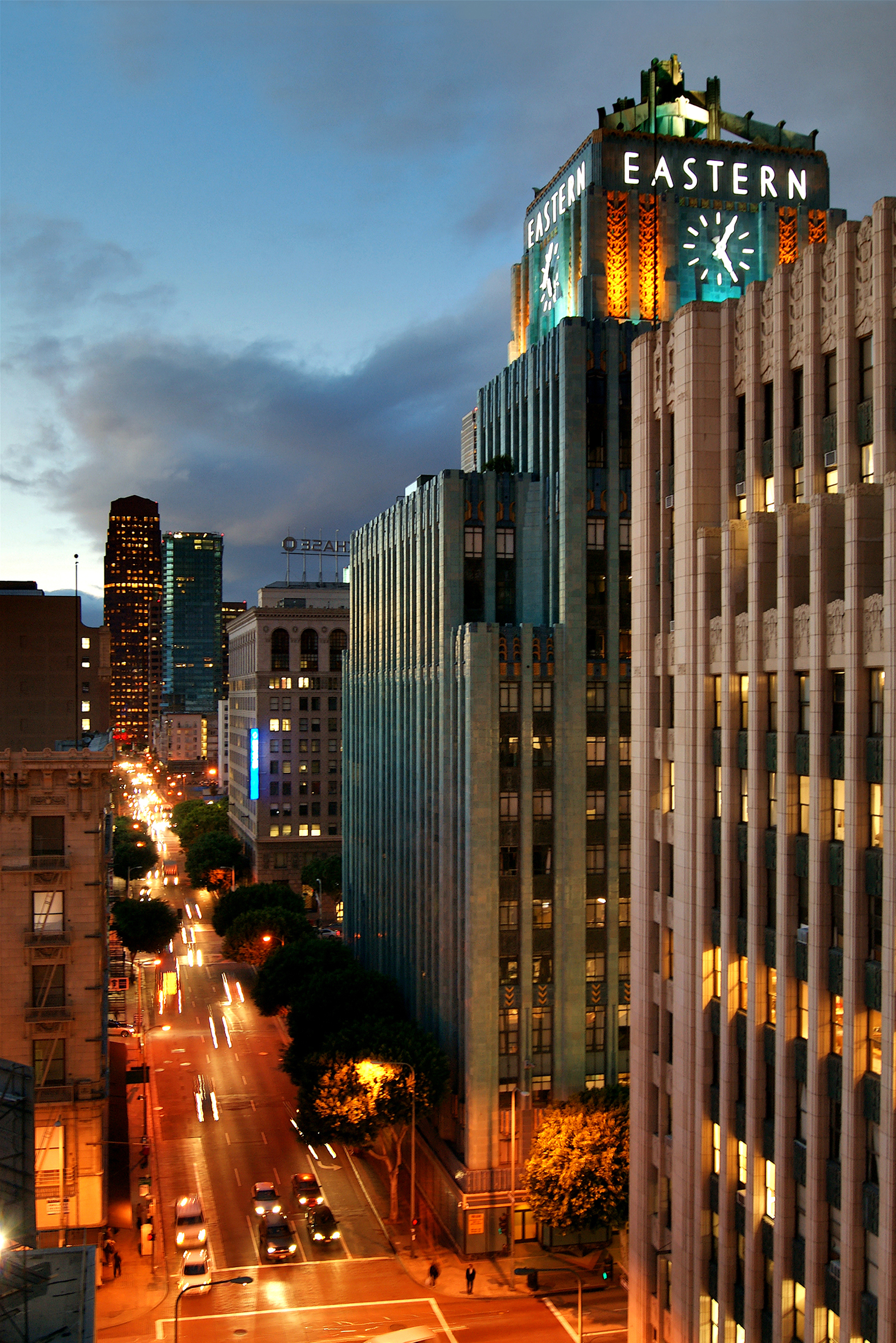
- The building in 2010

- Location within the Los Angeles metropolitan area
- Location: 849 S. Broadway; Los Angeles
- Coordinates: 34.0428°N 118.2555°W
- Built: 1930
- Architect: Claud Beelman
- Architectural style: Art Deco
- Part of: Broadway Theater and Commercial District (ID79000484)
- LAHCM No.: 294

Significant dates
- Designated CP: May 9, 1979
- Designated LAHCM: June 28, 1985

The Eastern Columbia Building, also known as the Eastern Columbia Lofts, is a thirteen-story Art Deco building designed by Claud Beelman located at 849 S. Broadway in the Broadway Theater District of Downtown Los Angeles. It opened on September 12, 1930, after just nine months of construction. It was built at a cost of US$1.25 million (equivalent to $18.63 million in 2025) as the new headquarters and 39th store for the Eastern-Columbia Department Store, whose component Eastern and Columbia stores were founded by Adolph Sieroty and family. At the time of construction, the City of Los Angeles enforced a height limit of 150 feet (46 m), however the decorative clock tower was granted an exemption, allowing the clock a total height of 264 feet (80 m). J. V. McNeil Company was the general contractor.

The edifice can be spotted from the Interstate 10 - Santa Monica Freeway, as well as many other sections of downtown, due to its bright "melting turquoise" terra cotta tiles and four-sided clock tower, emblazoned with the word "EASTERN" in bright white neon on each face of the clock.

The building is widely considered the greatest surviving example of Art Deco architecture in the city. It is one of the city's most photographed structures and an Art Deco landmark.

== Architecture ==
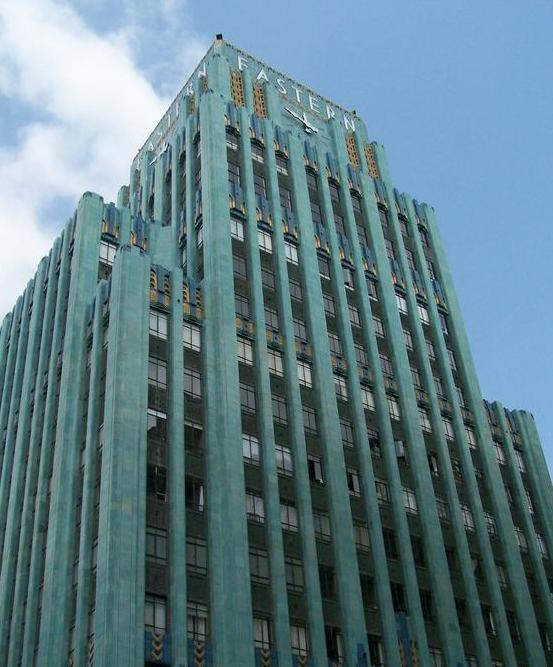
Signature glossy turquoise terra cotta cladding

The Eastern Columbia Building is built of steel-reinforced concrete and clad in glossy turquoise terracotta with deep blue and gold trim. The building's vertical emphasis is accentuated by deeply recessed bands of paired windows and spandrels with copper panels separated by vertical columns. The façade is decorated with a wealth of motifs—sunburst patterns, geometric shapes, zigzags, chevrons and stylized animal and plant forms. The building is capped with a four-sided clock tower emblazoned with the name "Eastern" in neon and crowned with a central smokestack surrounded by four stylized flying buttresses. The sidewalks surrounding the Broadway and Ninth Street sides of the building are of multi-colored terrazzo laid in a dynamic pattern of zigzags and chevrons. The central main entrance has a spectacular recessed two-story vestibule adorned with a blue and gold terra cotta sunburst. The vestibule originally led to a pedestrian retail arcade running through the center of the building.

== History ==
=== 20th century ===
The building was created to house the then-separate Eastern (furniture and homeware) and Columbia (apparel) department stores both owned and managed by Adolph Sieroty, who had founded his Los Angeles retail concern as a clock shop at 556 S. Spring St. in 1892.

At opening in 1930, the building had 275,650 sq. ft. of floor space. The first four floors and mezzanine were shared by Columbia and Eastern stores, with Columbia on the 9th & Broadway corner. From the 7th floor and up the floors were all Eastern. It was arranged as follows:

- Ground floor - L-shaped arcade and glassed-in display area, foyer and elevators, Columbia apparel
- Mezzanine, Eastern - pottery, Columbia apparel
- 2nd floor, Eastern - musical instruments, Columbia apparel
- 3rd floor, Eastern - floor coverings and rugs, Columbia apparel
- 4th floor, Eastern - bedding and bedding accessories, Columbia apparel
- 6th floor, shipping
- 7th floor, Eastern - porch and patio furniture, lamps
- 8th floor, Eastern - living room furniture
- 9th floor, Eastern - dining and breakfast room sets and "juvenile goods"
- 10th floor, Eastern - glassware and household accessories
- 11th floor, stock record department with 50 employees
- 12th floor, administrative offices and auditorium seating 700
- 13th floor, showers, clubroom and luncheonette for 700 employees; heating, air filtration, electricity and water (100,000-gallon tank) facilities, incinerator

In 1940, the company started advertising as the Eastern-Columbia Department Store. In 1950, the store expanded to cover the entire side of the block from Broadway to Hill Street.

In 1957, the company closed the Eastern-Columbia stores in its downtown flagship building, along with branch stores on S. Main St., Central Ave., Whittier Blvd., and in Long Beach. (It kept the Eastern stores in Bakersfield, Fresno, and Sacramento, and its Columbia store branches in Huntington Park, Lakewood and Long Beach.) The Eastern Columbia Building was refitted as office space targeted at the wholesale apparel industry.

=== 21st century ===
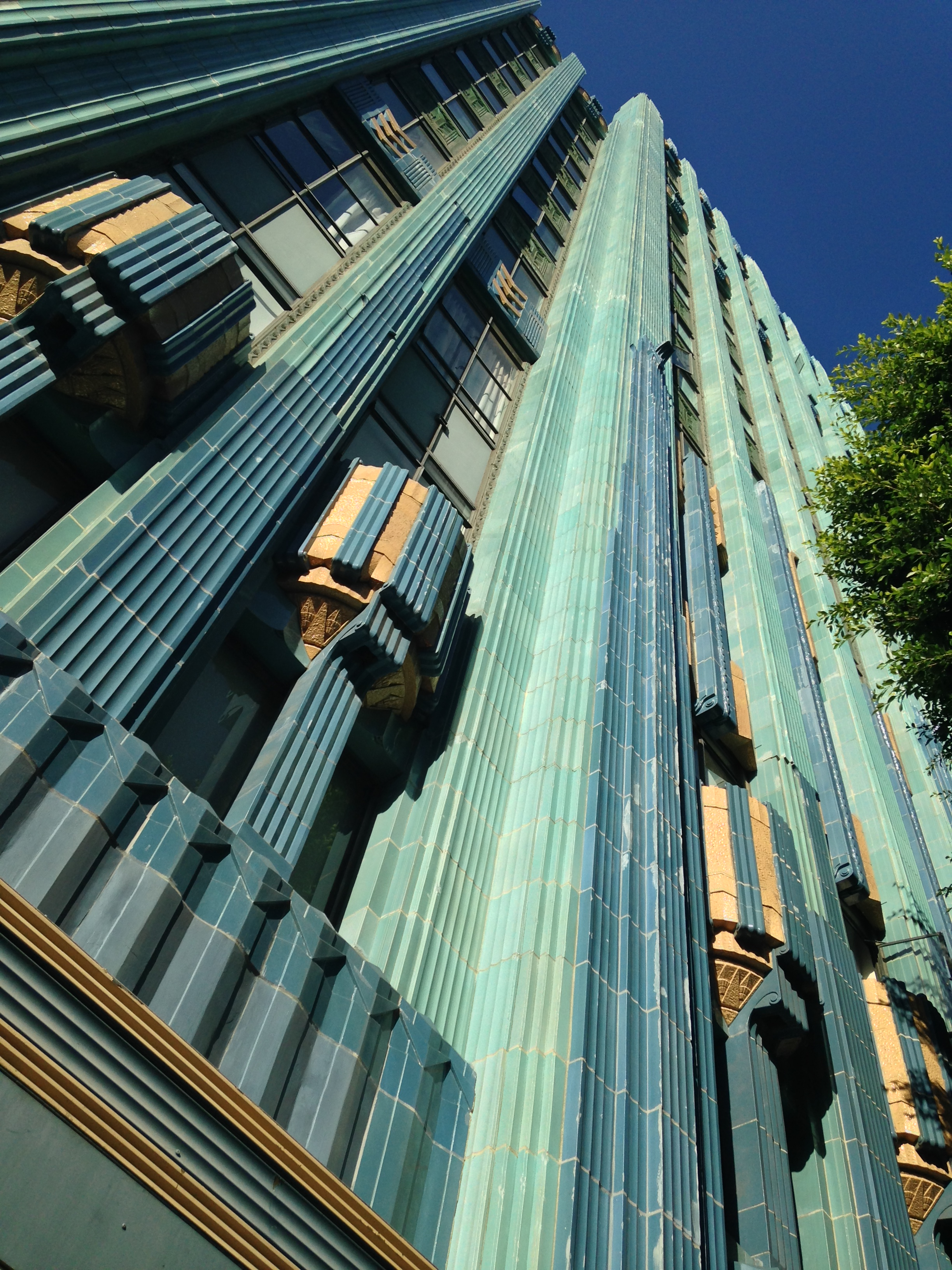
The verticality of the building on display.

In 2004, plans were made to convert the building into condominiums. On June 23, 2005, the long-defunct clock tower was reactivated in a ceremony with city and preservation leaders to celebrate the building's 75th anniversary. Developer KOR Group, in conjunction with Killefer Flammang Architects, completed a two-year $80-million renovation of the building in 2006, turning the property into 147 condominiums, with interior redesign completed by the firm Kelly Wearstler Interior Design These live/work lofts showcase the details of the early 20th century along with modern upgrades. The project earned California Construction Magazine's Best Redevelopment in 2007, McGraw Hill's Best Redevelopment of '07 Award, and the 2007 Multi-Housing News Adaptive Reuse Award. The Eastern Columbia Lofts earned a 2008 Los Angeles Conservancy Preservation Award. The building is a participant in the Mills Act Historic Property Contracts Program.

In 2014, the building was awarded $34,647 ($47,120 in 2025) through the Bringing Back Broadway initiative to upgrade the decorative arch lighting above the Broadway entrance. Since 2015 the building has been involved in a political dispute over a proposed adjacent project, the 26-story Alexan Broadway project at 9th and Hill Streets, that has faced some opposition because of concerns that it would block views of the Eastern Columbia and its landmark clock.

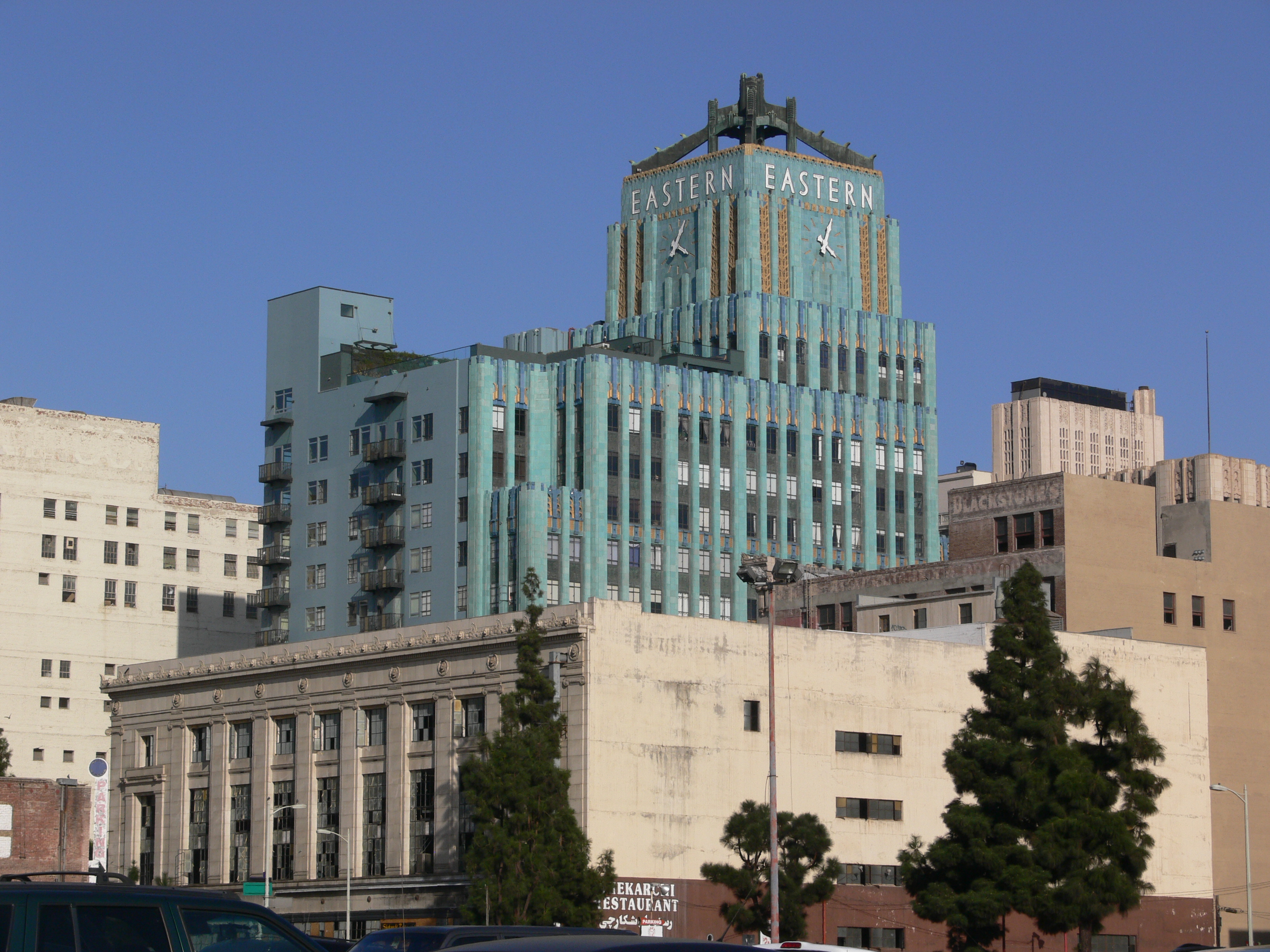
Historic Core skyline

Actor Johnny Depp acquired five penthouses in 2007, totaling a combined 11,500 square feet (1,070 m^{2}) of space. He and then-wife Amber Heard resided in these interconnected units during their marriage, and the apartments were later mentioned during the 2022 defamation trial between the couple. Following their divorce in 2016, Depp put the penthouses on the market, selling the last unit in 2017.

In 2016, billionaire Ronald Burkle sold a three-story penthouse within the Eastern Columbia for $2.5 million, among the highest prices ever paid per square foot for a residential unit in the Historic Core district.

== Impact ==
=== Accolades ===
The building has been characterized as the "benchmark of deco buildings in Los Angeles" and as one of the "grand dames of Art Deco Streamline Moderne in Los Angeles". Historian Robert Winter called the building "a shining example of Southern California's golden age of architecture". Los Angeles Times critic Christopher Hawthorne declared it "one of the most beautiful pieces of architecture in the city". Past president of the Art Deco Society of Los Angeles, Rory Cunningham, referred to the building as "one of the premier Deco buildings in the country". Ken Bernstein, director of the Office of Historic Resources for the City Planning Department, has stated that "The Eastern Columbia Building is unquestionably one of the signature Art Deco buildings in all of Los Angeles" and he selected it as one of the city's most beautiful buildings. The Eastern Columbia is lovingly referred to as the "Jewel of Downtown" and the "Art Deco Jewel of the West".

=== Monument status ===
The Eastern Columbia was listed as Los Angeles Historic-Cultural Monument No. 294 in 1985. "The property meets the criteria for HCM designation because it reflects the broad cultural, economic, or social history of the nation, state, or community. It has become a visual landmark and is representative of the vitality of Los Angeles' retail and commercial core."

The building sits in the Historic Core of Downtown Los Angeles, which is rich in historic architecture, and which has largely maintained its historic integrity, due in large part to hard fought preservation efforts, the 1999 Adaptive Re-Use Ordinance, and Councilmember Jose Huizar's "Bringing Back Broadway" initiative.

== In popular culture ==
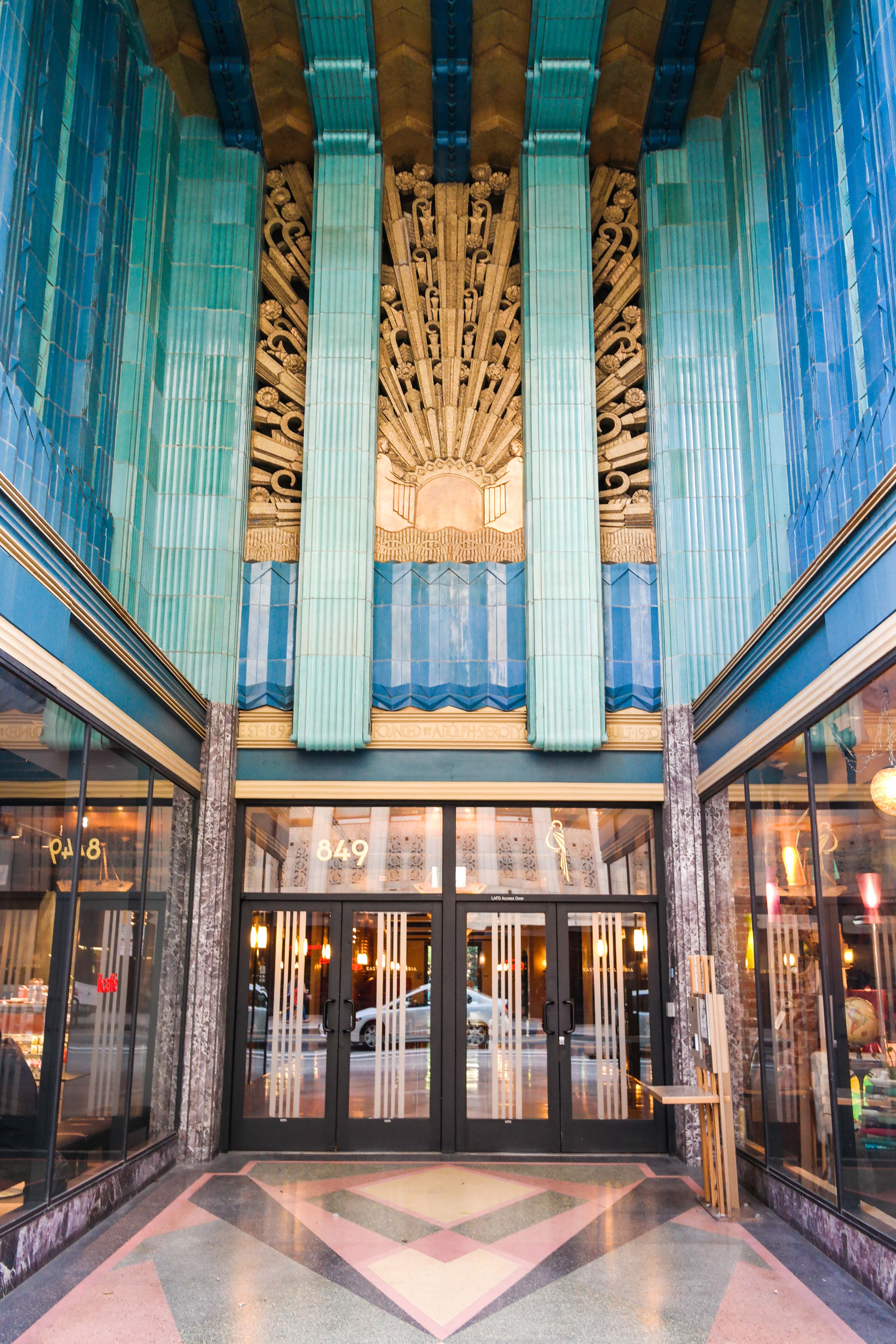
Eastern Columbia entrance

- In the 1930 film Sin Takes a Holiday starring Constance Bennett, the opening exterior shots show Manhattan and then a close up of the Eastern Columbia building, inaccurately implying it is located in New York.
- Over several decades, the city's airwaves chimed the jingle "Eastern Columbia, Broadway at Ninth" to advise Los Angeles shoppers of new arrivals and special offers at Downtown's flagship department store. The jingle was written by Julian M. Sieroty, son of the founder of the Eastern Columbia department store chain, Adolph Sieroty. The lilting ditty proved so popular that it was parodied regularly on television.
- The building was featured prominently on the September 29, 1946 radio broadcast of The Jack Benny Program. During the show, various cast members were asked where they had gotten specific items. Each answer was: "Eastern Columbia, Broadway at Ninth". The line was reprised the following week, October 6, 1946, but in an absurdist way: Jack asked Dennis Day where his mother ever got his father, to which Dennis replied "Eastern Columbia, Broadway at Ninth". Jack responded with "Gee, they have everything!"
- In the 1975 movie Doc Savage: The Man of Bronze, a sniper fires on the protagonist from the building, which is dubbed the "Eastern Cranmoor Building" and set in Manhattan in 1936.
- In another implied New York depiction of the L.A. building, the 1978 film I Wanna Hold Your Hand shows the Eastern Columbia in the background of shots of the CBS transmitting tower outside Studio 50 (where The Ed Sullivan Show was produced) as a protester attempts to sabotage the broadcast of the first-ever appearance of The Beatles on U.S. television.
- The finale of the two-hour 1985 pilot for the series Moonlighting takes place atop the building, with Cybill Shepherd and Bruce Willis climbing the building's enormous clock.
- The Nickelodeon series iCarly and the Paramount+ revival of the same name use digitally altered images of the building for the exterior of Bushwell Plaza, the fictional Seattle apartment building in which the main casts live and the web show is filmed.
- The Eastern Columbia Building appeared in the 1990 films 12:01 PM and Predator 2, the 2009 film 500 Days of Summer, and the TV series Lucifer (Season 3, Episode 16).
- The Eastern Columbia Building was featured extensively in the film The Last Hour.
- On April 14, 2022, the building was featured heavily in the Johnny Depp v. Amber Heard defamation case. Depp owned five penthouses in the Eastern Columbia Building.
- Downtown with Huell Howser
- The Eastern Columbia Building appeared in the 2024 film Beverly Hills Cop: Axel F.

== See also ==
- List of Los Angeles Historic-Cultural Monuments in Downtown Los Angeles
- List of contributing properties in the Broadway Theater and Commercial District
