= Getty Building (Los Angeles) =

Coordinates: 34.061350°N 118.309423°W

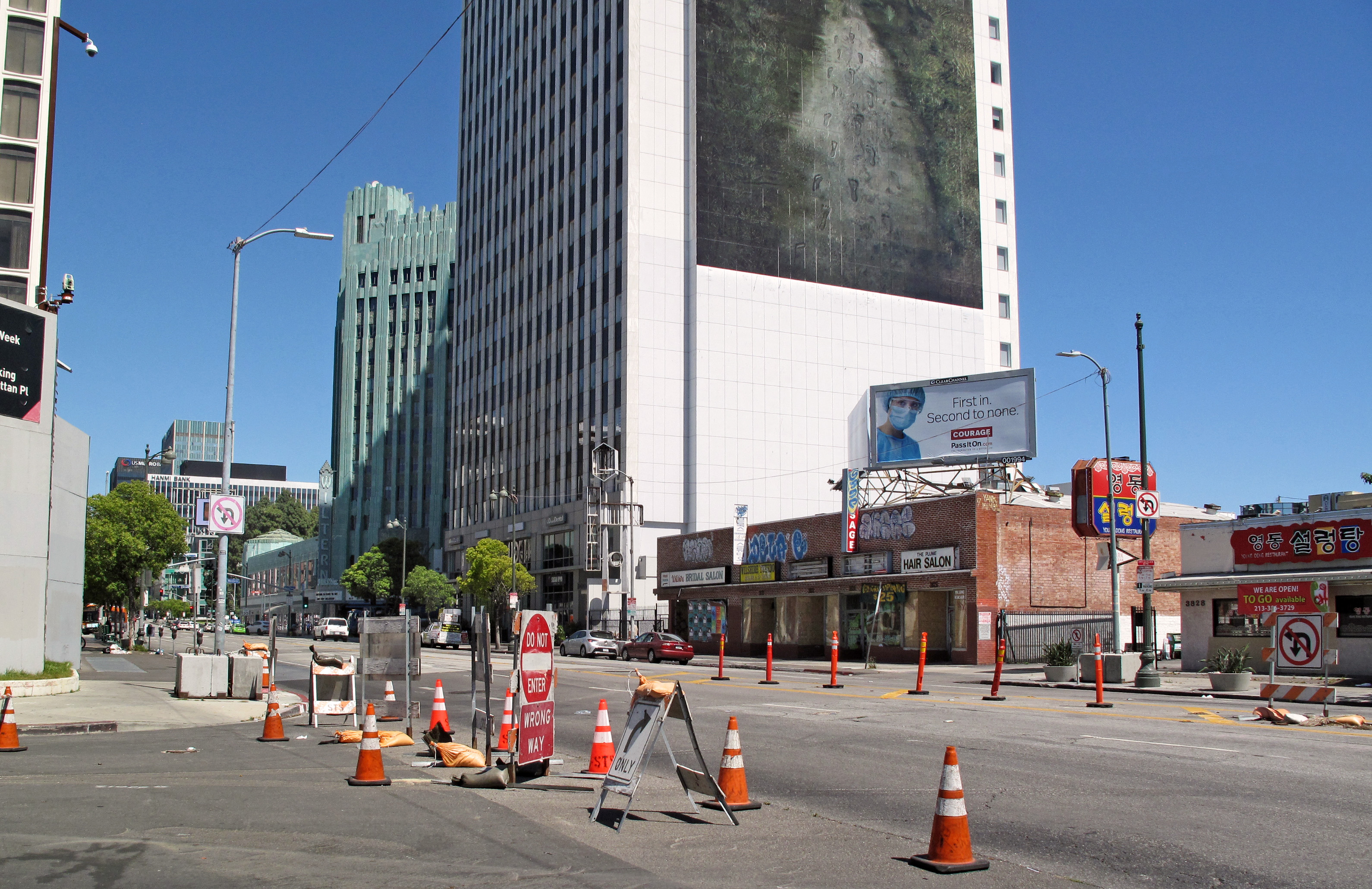

General information
- Location: Los Angeles, California, 3810 Wilshire Blvd
- Groundbreaking: March 14, 1961
- Opened: April 22, 1963

Technical details
- Floor count: 22

Design and construction
- Architect: Claud Beelman

The Getty Building is a 22-story former office tower in Los Angeles, California. The building was a project of J. Paul Getty and upon completion served as the head office of Getty Oil. The architect for the structure was Claud Beelman whose design was in a New Formalist mode. Construction began on March 14, 1961, and the building opened officially on April 22, 1963. After sitting vacant for a decade, the building underwent a residential conversion and reopened in 2007 as a condominium called the Mercury.

== History and design ==
The property at the southwest corner of Wilshire Boulevard and Western Avenue had belonged for many years to the Getty family. On March 9, 1960, J. Paul Getty announced from London that he planned to build a 22 storey, $10 million office tower on the site. The building was to be owned by Getty Realty, whose president was George F. Getty II. The building's main tenant would be the Union Bank of California, which leased the basement through third floors, as well as the 21st floor for its executive offices. At the time he announced the project, Getty stated that construction would begin in July 1960 with a completion date of January 1962, though this schedule ended up pushed back.

J. Paul Getty contracted architect Claud Beelman to design the structure. Several years earlier, Getty had hired Beelman to design the Tidewater Building on Wilshire for Tidewater Oil, another company Getty controlled. Beelman's design borrowed heavily from his earlier Superior Oil Company Building. The building is five bays wide along Wilshire and four bays wide along Western, with three-foot columns. Horizontally, each bay comprises four-foot wide windows separated by three-foot wide pilasters. The columns and pilasters are clad in white marble, while the windows are separated vertically by dark spandrels. The building is equipped with eight elevators, and a rooftop helipad was built to allow the bank executives quick access to their regional offices.

Construction of the Getty Building began on March 14, 1961. The contractor was the Dinwiddie Construction Company. The steel structure was fabricated and erected by Bethlehem Steel and was completed in December 1961. By the summer of 1962, construction was two-thirds completed and the expected occupancy date was that December.

The dedication ceremony for the building took place at 9:30 am on April 22, 1963. The ceremony was presided over by Union Bank's president Harry Volk. Also present at the ceremony were Union Bank vice-president John W. Luhring, George Getty II, and chairman of the County Board of Supervisors Warren Dorn. During the ceremony, J. Paul Getty telephoned Volk and said, "it is the culmination of my fondest dream to have such a magnificent structure there." An open house followed the dedication, during which time 3,500 people toured the building. On Friday, October 1, 1963, a new gentlemen's club called the Los Angeles Club opened on the 22nd (top) floor of the building.

In 1982, Getty Oil began construction on the new 10 Universal City Plaza, which would replace the Getty Building as the company's headquarters. Accordingly, in April 1982, the company sold the building to Equitec '81 Real Estate Investors. However, before the new building was completed, in January 1984 Getty Oil was acquired by Texaco.

== Drawings ==
Beelman's plans for the building are held at the Art, Design & Architecture Museum as part of the Claud W. Beelman architectural drawings collection.
