= Lionel Vincent Mayell =

Canadian-born real estate developer (1897–1978)

- Born: 4 February 1897
- Died: 31 August 1978 (aged 81)
- Occupation: Real estate developer
- Known for: Pioneering condominium ownership in the western United States

Lionel Vincent Mayell (4 February 1897 – 31 August 1978) was a Canadian born real estate developer and promoter who is credited with pioneering the concept of "own-your-own-apartment" (later known as condominium ownership) in the western United States in the early twentieth century.

== Early life ==
When Lionel Vincent Mayell was born on 4 February 1897, in London, Ontario, Canada, his father, Arthur Mayell, was 33 and his mother, Una Verda Peters, was 30. It is said he was so small that his parents used a drawer for his crib.

Mayell was seven when his brother, Carman, was born. However, when the family left Canada for a new life in California, seven-year-old Carman contracted dysentery and never recovered. Carman died in Los Angeles on 6 January 1910.

== Career ==
As a young man, the diminutive Mayell—he stood just 5' 2" tall—spent summers working at a tuna packing plant while he attended Occidental College, a private liberal arts college in Los Angeles. After graduating college Mayell may have attended law school. Mayell became enchanted with the idea of modern, communal apartments that would be owned by the residents. By the early 1920s easterners were flocking into southern California, and many needed affordable housing.

Mayell formed a corporation, raised capital, and in 1921–1922 built his first own-your-own apartment complex which he named the Artaban. The building is located at 10 Atlantic Boulevard in downtown Long Beach, and still serves as studio and one bedroom condos. However, parking was not so much in demand in 1921, and the Artaban of 2023 suffers from a lack of that crucial California amenity.

In 1923 Mayell participated in the development and sale of the Cooper Arms at 455 East Ocean Blvd, Long Beach. (According to the National Register of Historic Places Registration Form prepared by Portia Lee, PhD, Mayell was named as secretary of the Cooper Arms Building Company and as the successful promoter of the Artaban Apartments in promotional literature.) Designed by Los Angeles architects Alexander Curlett and Claud Beelman, the Cooper Arms is a twelve-story steel-reinforced concrete building with exterior walls of brick finished with stucco. The design has been described as Renaissance Revival with neo-classical and neo-Egyptian ornamentation so typical for that time in Los Angeles. Originally developed as a housing cooperative with 159 apartments offered for sale on "the own-your-own apartment plan," and with a construction budget of $1,350,000, the Cooper Arms was the most expensive development in Long Beach history to that time. Demand for the new apartments was brisk, and in the six months before construction began, more than $1,250,000 in apartments had already been sold. The building's 12th floor solarium and ballroom, occupying a major portion of the top floor, were among its most notable features. A promotional brochure claimed that the Cooper Arms would have the latest amenities, including steam heating, high-speed elevators, "instantaneous hot water at all times," "Iceless Frigidors," "Disappearing beds," and "Dustless roller screens." The Cooper Arms would become one of the first structures to be designated a Long Beach Historical Landmark when the city launched its historic preservation program in 1980, and it was added to the National Register of Historic Places in 2000. The building is still operated as a condominium community in 2023.

Mayell's magnum opus was the 16-story 130-unit $2.75 million Villa Riviera on Ocean Boulevard in Long Beach. From the time it was completed in 1929 through the mid-1950s, the Villa Rivera was the second-tallest building, and the tallest private building, in Southern California – surpassed in height only by the iconic Los Angeles City Hall. Luxurious amenities included a ballroom, an Italianate roof garden, lounges, high-speed elevators, "vacuum-type heating," and a 100-car garage. The Châteauesque building designed by award-winning architect Richard D. King has been called the city's "most elegant landmark," and many considered it the building that most defined the up-and-coming Long Beach. The Villa Riviera was added to the National Register of Historic Places in 1996 and continues, as Mayell envisioned, as a condominium community and including three penthouses on the 16th floor featuring exceptional views of the city and Pacific Ocean (and gargoyles flanking the picture windows).

The Wall Street crash of 1929, and the ensuing Great Depression, derailed Mayell's business and fortunes. The market for luxury homes fell off, while a friend of his late father – Arthur had died in 1925 at the age of 61 – reportedly convinced Mayell to back a traveling theatrical variety show that would lift peoples' spirits. Instead, Mayell reportedly went in the hole to the tune of $25,000 per show.

By the time of the 1940 U.S. Federal Census Mayell was living with his mother and two children at 684 South June Street in Central Los Angeles, and working as an apartment manager which had earned him $720 in the previous year. However, the post-war housing boom of the late 1940s, together with his third marriage to Dorothy Bernice Anderson, seems to have rejuvenated Mayell's business ambitions. In the coming years he would develop at least 18 more occupant-owned apartment projects in Southern California, Arizona, and Florida, most of these being what would become known as mid-century modern.

Mayell projects in Pasadena, California during this period included Park Lane Pasadena (1949), Capri Aire (1951), Villa San Pasqual (1954), Plaza del Arroyo (1955), and Whispering Waters (1960).

The Villa Catalina in Tucson, Arizona, and the Villa del Coronado in Phoenix, are other Mayell projects of the Midcentury Modern genre. The former was constructed in two phases between 1957 and 1961 on what was then the eastern edge of the Sonoran desert. After several decades of growth, Villa Catalina is now in the middle of town, but the community still includes grass lawns, two swimming pools, a putting green, and built in barbecue grills for its aged 55+ occupants.

Lionel Mayell Enterprises was placed into bankruptcy in 1966. Mayell then left the building industry to start a new career working for the Campus Crusade for Christ in San Bernardino, California.

== Marriage and children ==
Mayell was first married to Marjorie Elizabeth Doolittle on 21 October 1922 in Los Angeles County, California. The marriage seems to have ended in divorce, Marjorie having been remarried to William Chaloner Talbot in about 1928. However, Mayell reported in the 1930 U.S. Federal Census that he was a widower. Regardless, the couple seems to have had no children together.

The 1930 U.S. Federal Census found Mayell living with his mother in a large house at 42 Kennebec Avenue in Long Beach. Also in the home were lodgers named Edwin Smith and Carma E. Lee, and a servant named Lulu Landsdowne. There is no known marriage record, but in 1931 Carma gave birth to a son who the couple named Lionel Vincent Mayell. A daughter named Myrna Yvonne Mayell followed in 1933.

The 1940 U.S. Federal Census found Mayell still living with his mother, but now at 684 South June Street in Central Los Angeles. Mayell's two children by Carma were also in the home, but Carma was not. Mayell reported to the enumerator that he was divorced, and Carma was evidently remarried to a man named Jarrett Beckett with whom she lived in Long Beach in 1940.

Mayell third married Dorothy Bernice Anderson on 26 November 1944 in Los Angeles. The couple had no children together, but Dorothy has been credited with reviving Mayell's business fortunes, and also in igniting an interest in religion that would persist for the rest of his life. It was Mayell who invited 25-year-old Billy Graham to speak at a Youth for Christ Conference in Los Angeles. Not long after that, Mayell suggested Graham as a speaker at an evangelistic outreach in Los Angeles in 1949. Because this event was so well-received and publicized, it launched Graham on his worldwide ministry. Graham later wrote to Mayell: "My dear friend, my brother, Lionel Mayell, whose hospitality and generous spirit has meant many happy and precious hours of sweet fellowship. How God has used you in our lives. Both Ruth and I send our love".

Mayell died on 31 August 1978, in San Bernardino, California, at the age of 80.
