= Cooper Arms Apartments =

- Cooper Arms
- U.S. National Register of Historic Places
- Long Beach Historic Landmark
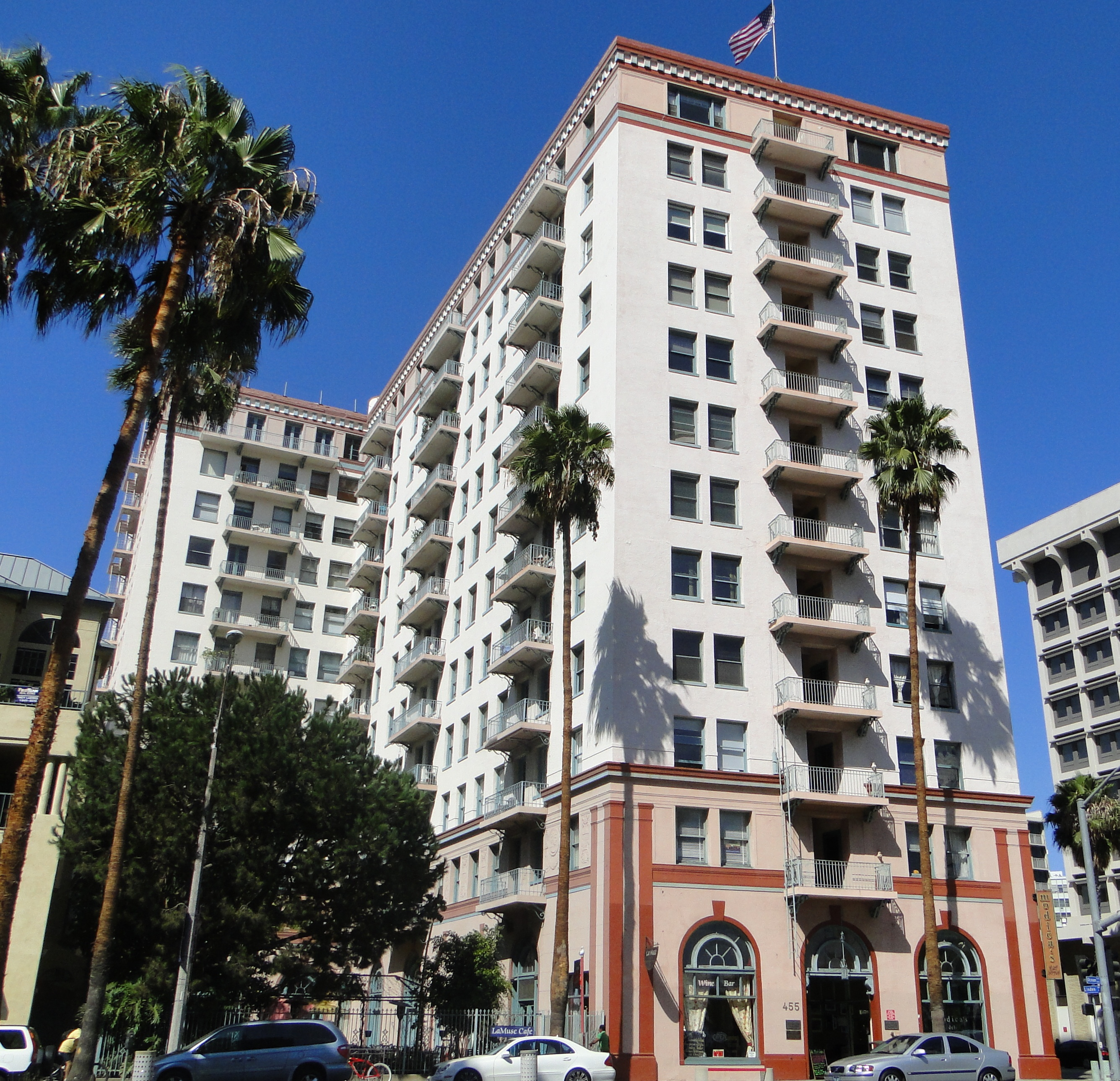

- Location within the Los Angeles metropolitan area Location within California Location within the United States
- Location: 455 E Ocean Blvd, Long Beach, California
- Coordinates: 33°46′1″N 118°11′13″W
- Built: 1923
- Architect: Curlett & Beelman; Scofield Construction
- Architectural style: Renaissance Revival
- NRHP reference No.: 00001538
- Added to NRHP: December 28, 2000

Cooper Arms Apartments is a registered historic building located on Ocean Boulevard in downtown Long Beach, California. The twelve-story Renaissance Revival apartment tower was built in 1923. It was one of the first structures to be designated a Long Beach Historical Landmark when the city launched its historic preservation program in 1980, and it was added to the National Register of Historic Places in 2000. It is currently operated as condominiums.

== Description and architecture ==
Cooper Arms is a twelve-story steel-reinforced concrete building with exterior walls of brick finished with stucco. Located on Ocean Boulevard (at the corner of Linden Avenue) in the East Village near downtown Long Beach, the structure was designed by Los Angeles architects Curlett & Beelman. The design of the L-shaped apartment building has been described as Renaissance Revival and "Adam Revival" with neo-classical and neo-Egyptian ornamentation.

Cooper Arms was originally developed as a housing cooperative with 159 apartments (and 406 rooms) which were offered for sale on "the own-your-own apartment plan," an idea that was promoted by Canadian born real estate developer Lionel Vincent Mayell (who also served as secretary of the Cooper Arms Building Company).

With a construction budget of $1,350,000, the Cooper Arms was the most expensive development in Long Beach history to that time. The construction was handled by Scofield Engineering and Construction Company, the same company that built the Los Angeles Biltmore. Demand for the new apartments was brisk, and in the six months before construction began, more than $1,250,000 in apartments had already been sold.

The building's 12th floor solarium and ballroom, occupying a major portion of the top floor, were among its most notable features. The ballroom included a domed ceiling and ornate moldings and lanterns. Another popular feature was the ground-level garden along Ocean Boulevard which opened onto a Spanish loggia extending through the structure to Linden Avenue.

A promotional brochure published in 1922 noted that the Cooper Arms would have the latest amenities, including steam heating, high-speed elevators, "instantaneous hot water at all times," "Iceless Frigidors," "Disappearing beds," and "Dustless roller screens."

== History ==
The Cooper Arms property was developed by Larkin Cooper. It was built on a portion of Ocean Boulevard that had previously been "given over to fine homes." There were originally eight houses on the site, all owned by Cooper. Cooper came to Long Beach from Emporia, Kansas, where he had been in the feed and grain business.

In April 1922, the Long Beach Daily Telegram announced the plan to build a luxury apartment building on the site. The planned development was billed as follows: "Long Beach to Have Finest Apartments in Whole Southland."

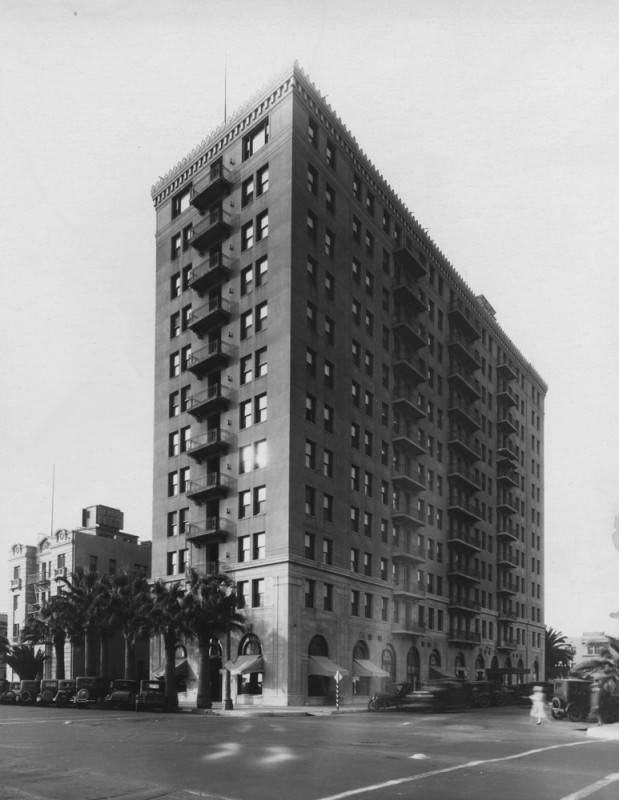
The Cooper Arms, c. 1925

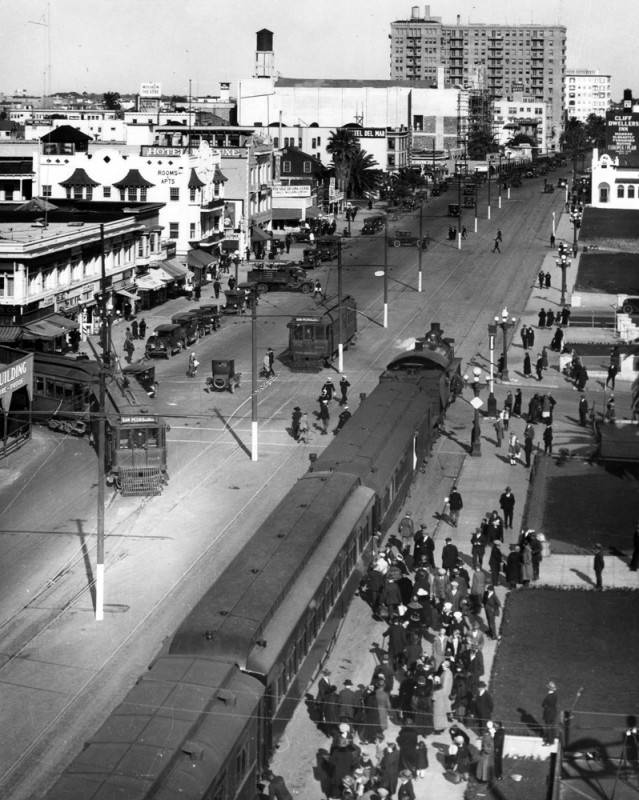
The Cooper Arms in the background, c. 1925

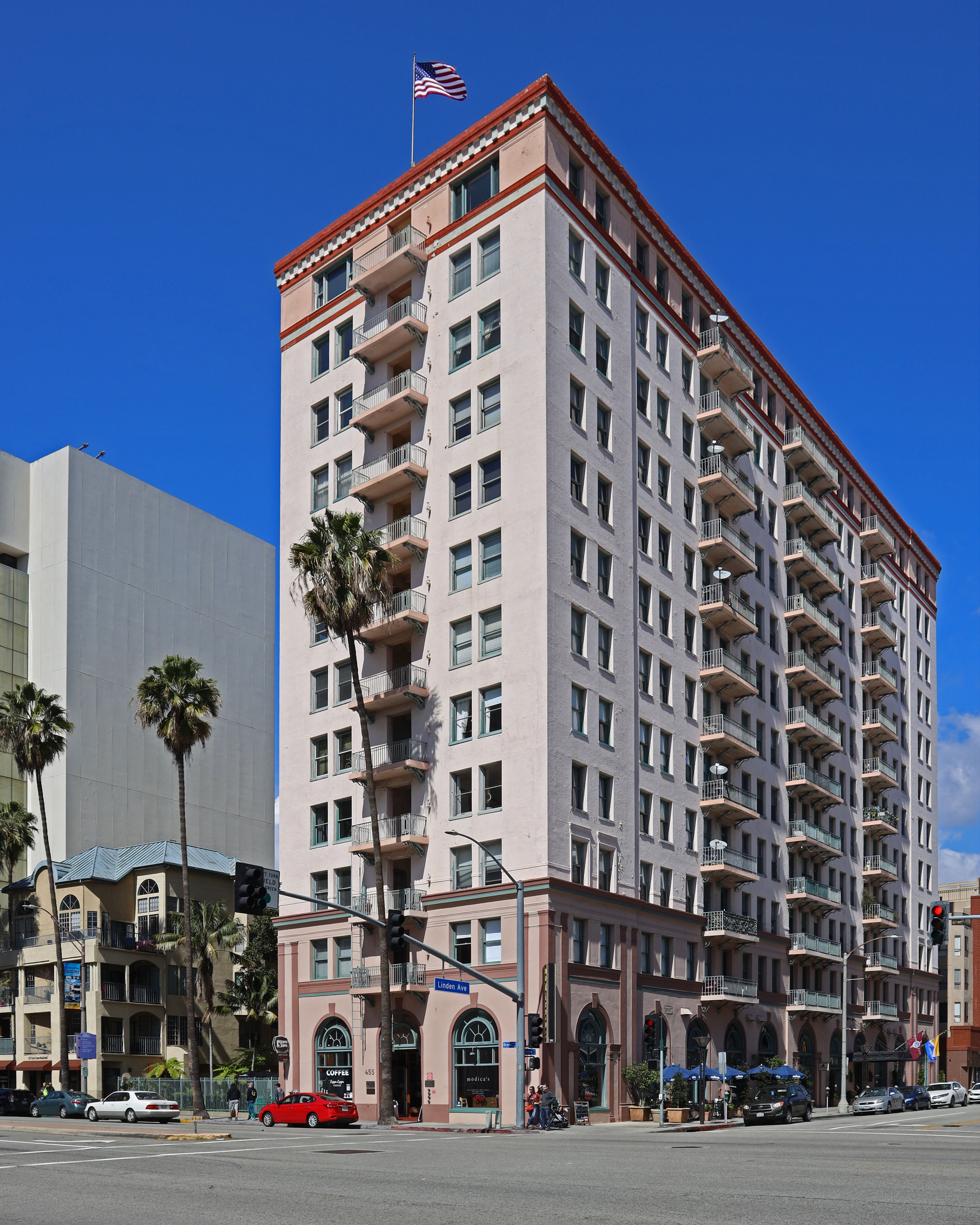
The Cooper Arms

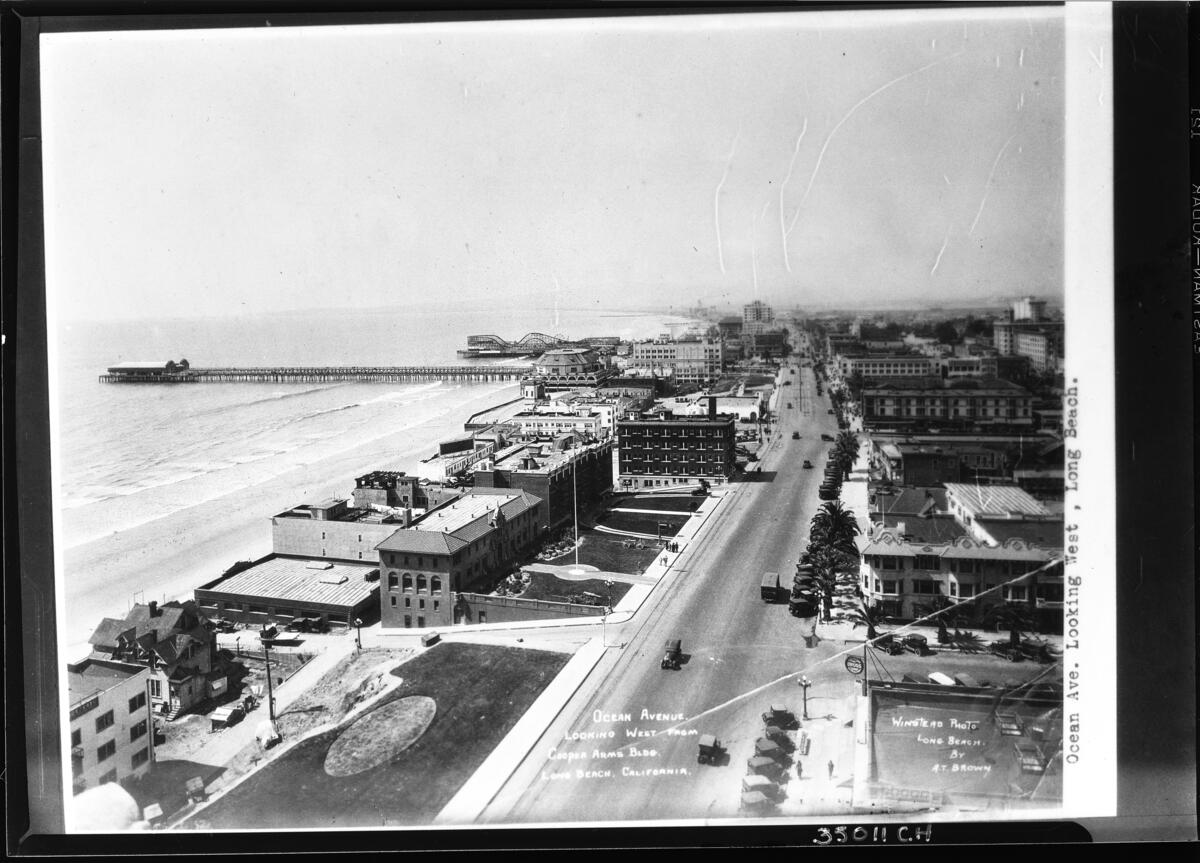
View looking west from the Cooper Arms, October 1929

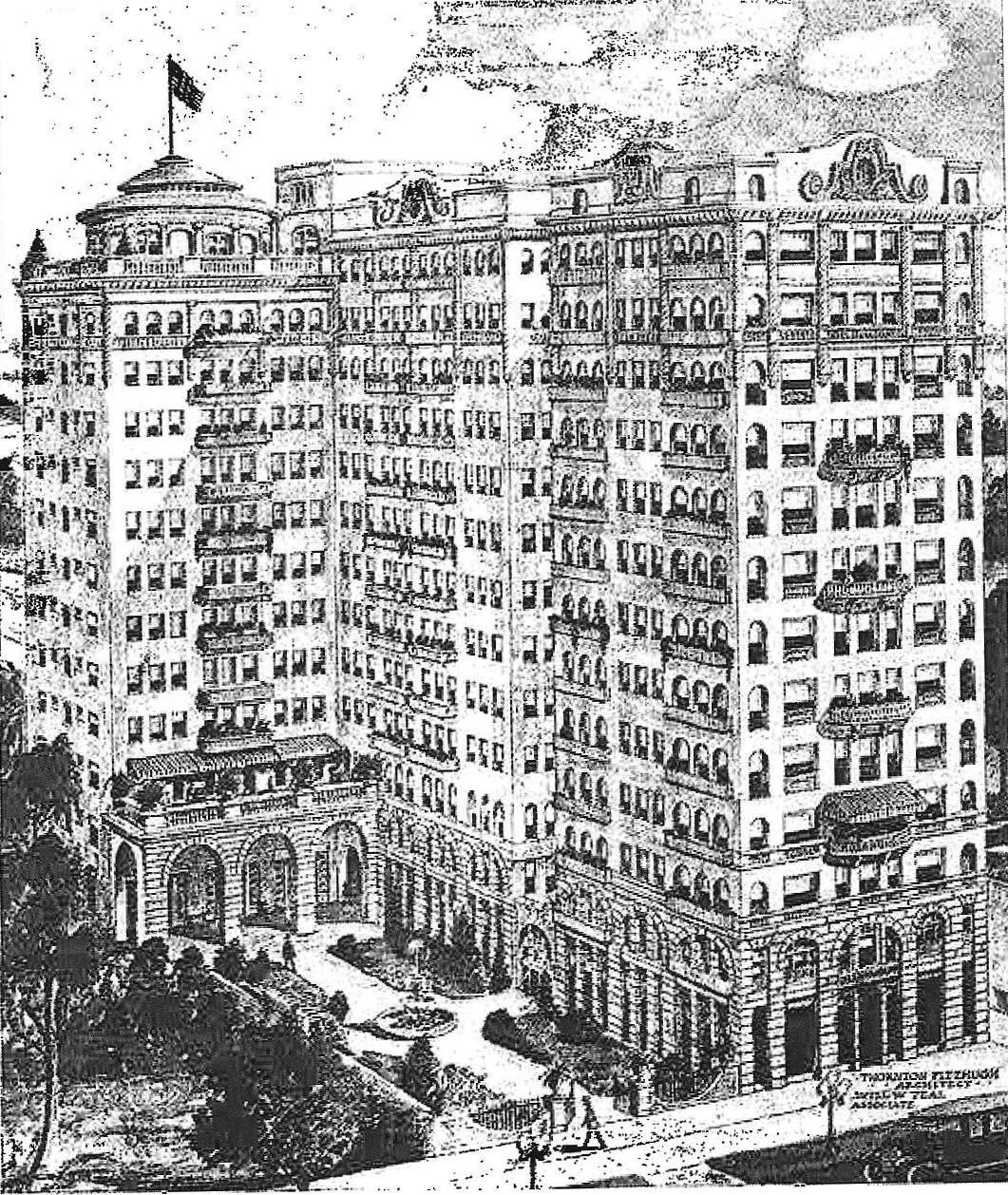
Drawing of the Cooper Arms from 1922 promotional brochure

The building was constructed from 1923-1924 when Long Beach was undergoing a building and population boom. When construction started in March 1923, the Los Angeles Times published a drawing of the Cooper Arms and described it as "an apartment-house which when completed, will be one of the most imposing structures of its kind west of Chicago." At the time, Long Beach's skyline lacked other skyscrapers, and the Times predicted that "this magnificent building will become a landmark that may be seen from ocean vessels miles away."

In 1933, the Cooper Arms survived the Long Beach earthquake without major damage. One long-time resident recalled standing on the roof of the building when the earthquake struck:

I was tinkering with an old radio when the earthquake hit. It knocked me flat on my face. I watched the old Edgewater Building topple down. This building [Cooper Arms] is built out of steel and concrete. It just swayed from east to west — but it held together. We heard there was going to be a tidal wave after the earthquake, so I gathered my camping gear and fishing pole, got into my Franklin automobile and drove to Lake Henshaw to do a little fishing until the excitement died down.

In 1974, the building celebrated its 50th anniversary with three of the original occupants still in residence. At the time, the Long Beach Independent Press-Telegram wrote that some of the excitement and luster had faded: "Party days at the Cooper Arms, along with the festive zest which once was the order of the day, have waned with the passage of years. The downtown lounge, with its plush oriental carpeting and ornate baroque ceilings, is now quiet and empty."

The building is currently operated as condominiums by the Cooper Arms Homeowners Association.

== Historic designation ==
In 1980, the Long Beach Cultural Heritage Committee designated Cooper Arms a Long Beach Historic Landmark. It was among the first group of seven structures to receive the designation. The other structures included in the first group were Villa Riviera, First Congregational Church, Rancho Los Cerritos, Rancho Los Alamitos, Jergins Trust Building and the Pacific Coast Club.

Cooper Arms was also listed on the National Register of Historic Places in October 2000.

== See also ==
- List of City of Long Beach Historic Landmarks
- National Register of Historic Places listings in Los Angeles County, California
