= Hollywood Professional Building =

Building in Los Angeles, California, U.S.

- U.S. Historic district – Contributing property
- Los Angeles Historic-Cultural Monument
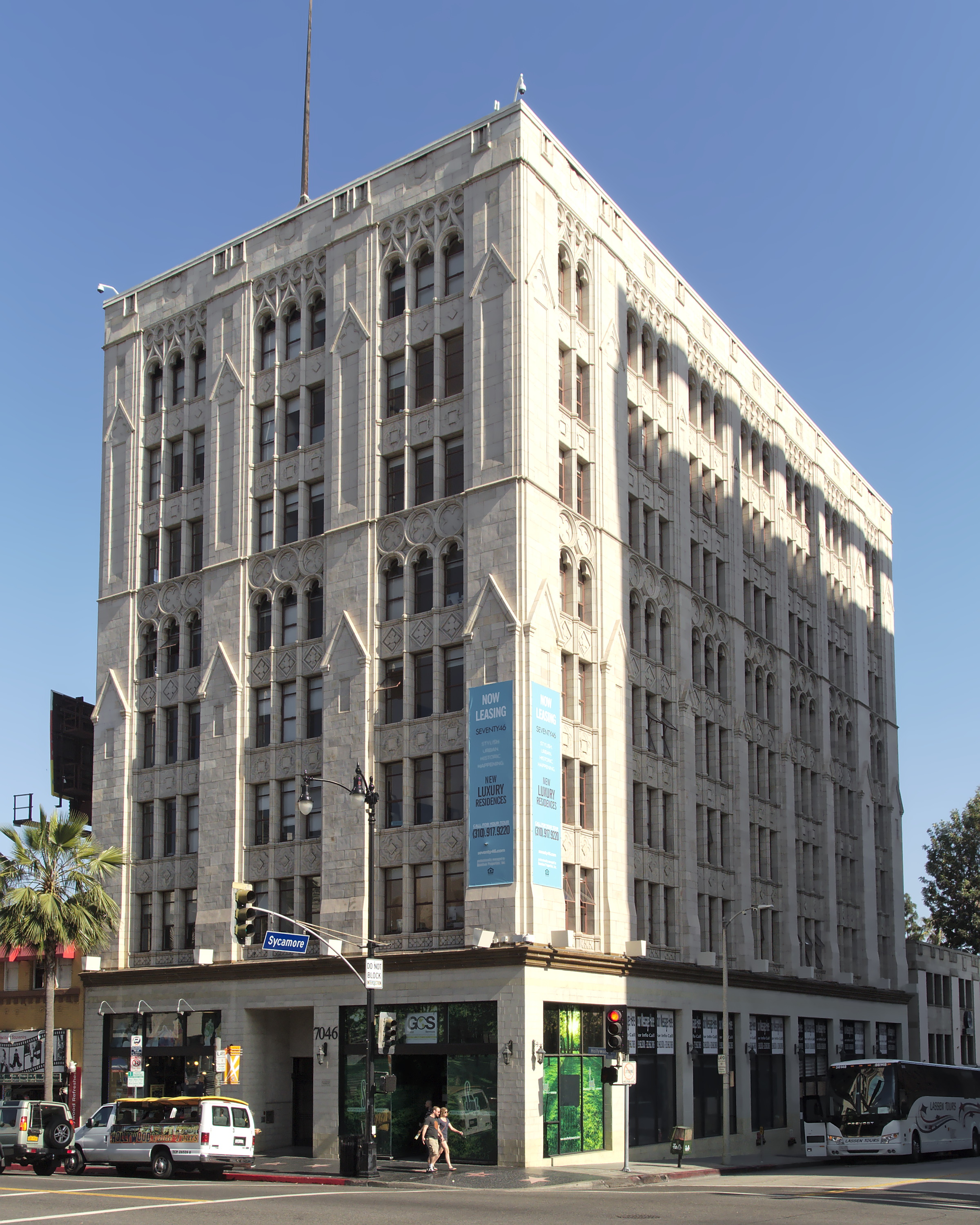
- Building in 2015

- Location within the Los Angeles metropolitan area
- Location: 7046 W. Hollywood Blvd., Hollywood, California
- Coordinates: 34.1015°N 118.3432°W
- Built: 1924
- Architect: Richard D. King
- Architectural style: Neo-Gothic
- Part of: Hollywood Boulevard Commercial and Entertainment District (ID85000704)
- LAHCM No.: 876

Significant dates
- Designated CP: April 4, 1985
- Designated LAHCM: February 15, 2007

Hollywood Professional Building, also known as SEVENTY46, is a historic eight-story building at 7046 W. Hollywood Blvd. in Hollywood, California. The Los Angeles Department of City Planning describe the building as exhibiting "character defining features of Neo-Gothic style architecture" and the United States Department of the Interior describe it as "an excellent example of Neo-Gothic commercial design."

== History ==
Built in 1924, Hollywood Professional Building was designed by Richard D. King and constructed to be an office building for Herman P. Rehbein, vice-president of the Bernard Oil Company. Originally, the building was five stories tall, but when ownership was transferred to Toberman & Company in 1929, the new owners added three stories to the top of the building. Toberman & Company maintained ownership of the building until 1961.

From 1930 to 1935, the Academy of Motion Picture Arts and Sciences had offices in this building, and from 1938 to 1956, the Screen Actors Guild was headquartered here, with future United States president Ronald Reagan's office in the building when he was president of the union from 1947 to 1953. John Lautner also had an office in the building.

In 1985, the Hollywood Boulevard Commercial and Entertainment District was added to the National Register of Historic Places, with Hollywood Professional listed as a contributing property in the district. In 2007, the building was designated a Los Angeles Historic-Cultural Monument.

In 2004, CIM Group acquired the building, after which they repurposed it to a loft-style apartment complex that they named SEVENTY46.

== Architecture ==
The United States Department of the Interior describe the Hollywood Professional Building as "an excellent example of Neo-Gothic commercial design," and the Los Angeles Department of City Planning further describe the building as exhibiting "high artistic value" and "character-defining features" of the neo-gothic style. The building was the first on Hollywood Boulevard to feature neo-gothic architecture.

The building is rectangular in plan and has a recessed centered entrance with bronze framed, glass paneled doors with transoms above. The building's facade is sheathed in ivory colored glazed terra cotta, with the second and eighth floors featuring pointed piers. The facade also features numerous decorative trefoils, quatrefoils, and circular tracery. Windows are large hopper style steel sash, grouped in threes and separated by fluted piers. A modified crenellated parapet serves as the capital of the composition. The building's interior lobby features four groin vaults and travertine wainscoting.

== See also ==
- List of Los Angeles Historic-Cultural Monuments in Hollywood
- List of contributing properties in the Hollywood Boulevard Commercial and Entertainment District
