= Hotel Hayward =

Historic structure in Los Angeles, California

- U.S. Historic district – Contributing property
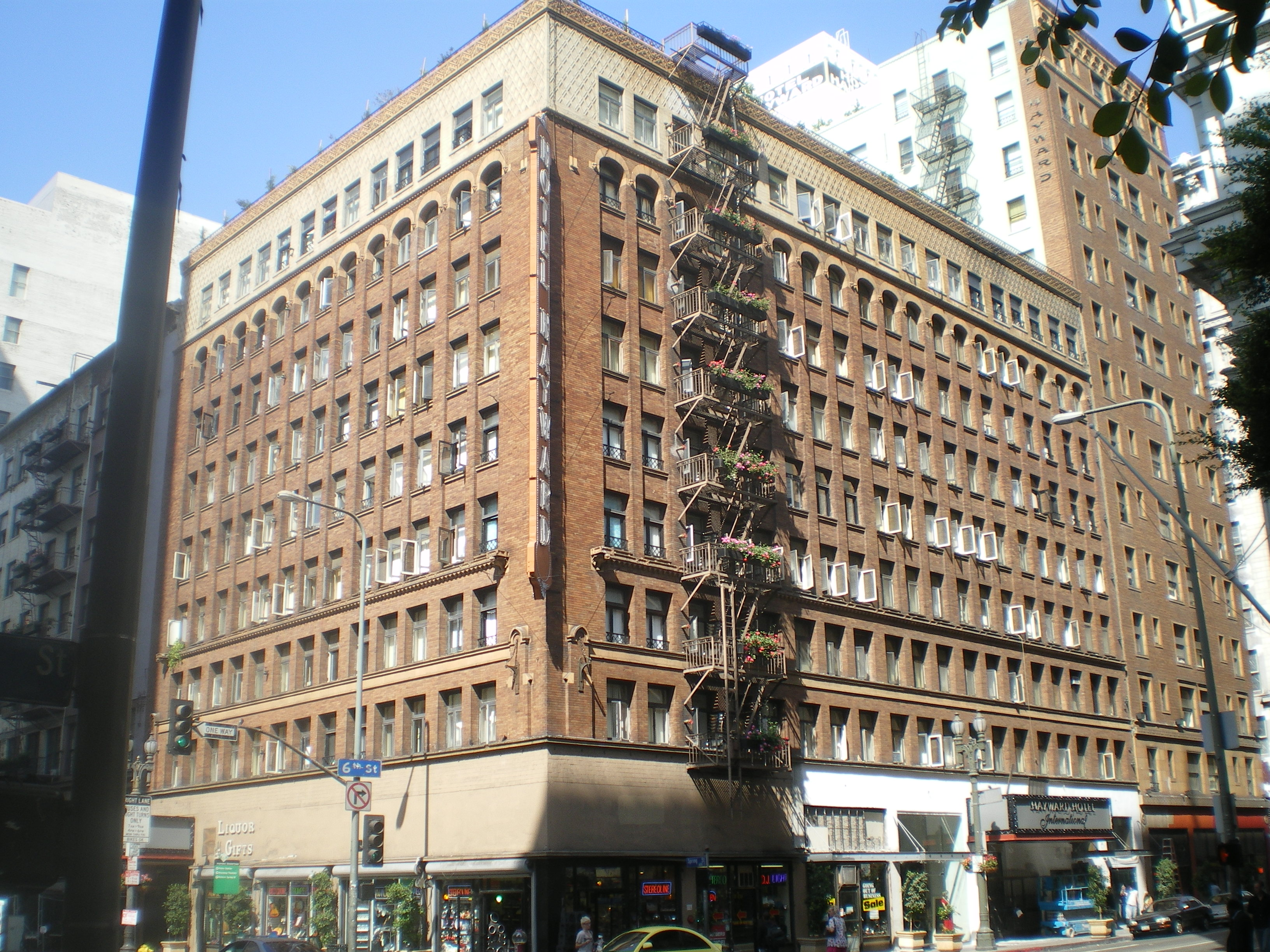
- The building in 2008

- Location within the Los Angeles metropolitan area
- Location: 601 S. Spring Street and 206 W. 6th Street, Los Angeles, California
- Coordinates: 34.0459°N 118.2513°W
- Built: 1905, 1918, 1925
- Architects: Charles Frederick Whittlesey (1905); Richard D. King (1918); Parkinson and Parkinson (1925)
- Part of: Spring Street Financial District (ID79000489)
- Designated CP: August 10, 1979

Hotel Hayward, also known as Hayward Manor, is a historic building located at 601 S. Spring Street and 206 W. 6th Street, on the corner of 6th and Spring, in downtown Los Angeles, California. It is a contributing property in the Spring Street Financial District.

== History ==
=== Beginnings ===
Hotel Hayward was designed by Charles Frederick Whittlesey and built in 1905. A south-side addition was designed by Richard D. King and built in 1918, and a west-side addition was designed by Parkinson and Parkinson and built in 1925. Real estate investor Henderson Hayward paid for the construction; the cost of the second annex was budgeted at $600,000 ($11 million in 2025). The hotel was originally advertised as an elegant building where “special attention is given to ladies traveling alone.”

In 1957, the Young Women's Christian Association opened a transient hotel for women on the sixth floor of this building. In 1979, the Spring Street Financial District was added to the National Register of Historic Places, with Hotel Hayward listed as a contributing property in the district.

=== Decline ===
In 1992, the City of Los Angeles bought and renovated Hotel Hayward for a budgeted $25 million ($57.4 million in 2025), after which the building was owned by a private partnership and used for low-income housing. The project was part of a larger $110 million effort that Mayor Tom Bradley called "the most ambitious affordable housing effort in Los Angeles history."

After the building's renovation, it was the only city-funded affordable-housing project with armed security on its premises. Despite this, the building was known for its crime during this time. The Los Angeles Police Department listed the building as one where drug dealing frequently occurs (including by Jimmy Lee Smith); prostitution, sexual assault, and robbery were known to occur; three homicides were reported in the building in 1993; and during one 18-month window, more than 2,000 security or criminal related activities were reported. The building was also infested with rodents and cockroaches, and at one point a decomposed body was discovered by following a trail of maggots under a doorway.

A receiver was appointed to the building in August 1995 and a lawsuit was filed against the hotel owners and security company that December. By 1997, the building had defaulted on its loans, resulting in losses of more than $10 million to taxpayer and $14 million to bondholders.

Izek Shomof purchased the building in 2002. In 2017, Los Angeles City Council voted to issue up to $80 million ($105 million in 2025) in bonds provide financing for the building.

== Architecture and design ==
Hotel Hayward is built of steel-reinforced concrete with a brick and terra cotta facade. The original construction features a Commercial Style design; the first annex matches this design and the second annex is similar in design. The original construction is eight stories, the first annex is seven stories, and the second annex is fourteen stories. The second annex features decorative cornice and a rear tower.

The building including its annexes has 525 units.

== See also ==
- List of contributing properties in the Spring Street Financial District
