= Bijou Theater (Hermosa Beach) =

Former theater in Hermosa Beach, CA

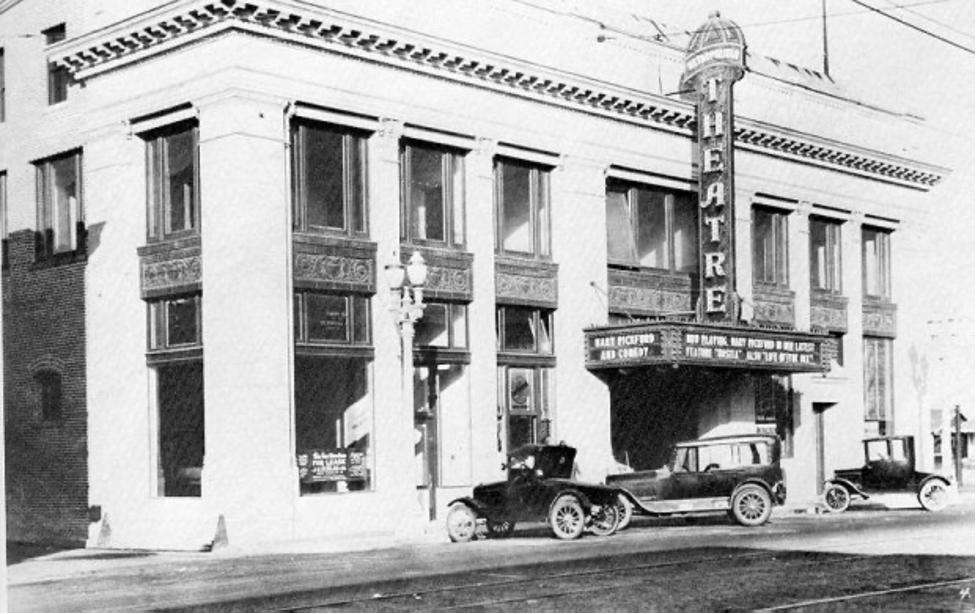
- The theater in 1924
- Interactive map of Bijou Theater
- Former names: Metropolitan Theater; Hermosa Theater; The Cove (and variants thereof)
- Address: 1229 Hermosa Ave. Hermosa Beach, California, U.S.
- Coordinates: 33.86297°N 118.40026°W
- Capacity: 864
- Type: Performing arts and movie

Construction
- Built: 1923
- Opened: June 27, 2023
- Renovated: 1985, 2000, 2013
- Closed: December 22, 1996
- Architect: Richard D. King

Bijou Theater, formerly Metropolitan Theater, Hermosa Theater, and The Cove, was a performing arts and movie theater located in Hermosa Beach, California, United States.

== History ==
In early 1923, Ralph Matteson, co-founder of First Bank of Hermosa Beach, announced plans to build a $200,000 ($3.78 million in 2025), 1,200-seat theater that would also contain banking rooms and offices. The building, built by Richard D. King, was named Metropolitan Theater, the name coming from a contest that saw more than 500 entries. It was operated by West Coast Theatres, sat 864, and opened on June 27, 1923, with five Orpheum acts, a novelty and a cooking comedy, and the premiere of Circus Days. Lew Lewis Orchestra also performed and Circus Days cast members as well as producer Sol Lesser were in attendance. The crowd overflowed the block before they were let in and the entertainment did not end until after 2AM.

The theater was sold to Fox West Coast Theaters, who renamed it Hermosa Theater c. 1931. It struggled to play first run movies due to studio distribution policies, but was still popular due to its location within Hermosa Beach. It was converted to CinemaScope in 1954. In 1969, it and several other theaters in the Los Angeles area were cited for screening I Am Curious (Yellow).

The theater was repeatedly renamed various forms of The Cove from the 1970s to 1983. It showed mostly surf movies, Rocky Horror Picture Show, and the occasional punk rock concert during this time. On December 28, 1982, the crowd for a concert featuring The Alley Cats, Redd Kross, Channel 13, and The Joneses caused significant damage to the theater and nearby neighborhood; as a result, the theater was closed and sold the following year.

The new owners reopened the theater as Bijou Theater on September 29, 1983. This theater, which screened foreign, art, and other lesser known films, struggled to turn a profit. It underwent a $50,000 upgrade in 1985 ($149,675 in 2025) and closed on December 22, 1996.

The building was designated a Hermosa Beach historic landmark in 1999. That same year, city council voted 4–1 to convert it to retail. CIM Group performed the conversion, which kept the facade intact but gutted the interior. By 2001, the building was occupied by an architect, coffee shop, and ice cream parlor, and an art gallery became its main tenant in 2003.

The building was renovated again in 2013, after which it was occupied by a Chase bank. It sold for $18 million in 2019 ($22.7 million in 2025).

== Architecture and design ==
The building is rectangular in plan, with 100-by-150-foot (30 m × 46 m) dimensions. It featured a neo-classical design with a terra cotta facade.

The building originally contained a first floor lobby, bank, theater, and storefront, fourteen second floor offices, and a third floor Masonic lodge and club rooms. The lobby was prominently arched, covered in title, lined with multi-colored jazzed plaster, and filled with alcoves, hangings, and paintings. The theater featured a $20,000 ($377,930 in 2025) pipe organ and seats that included large divans and leather opera chairs.
