= Roosevelt Theatre =

Former theater in Los Angeles, CA

- Interactive map of Roosevelt Theatre
- Address: 803 South Vermont Avenue; Los Angeles, California, U.S.
- Coordinates: 34.0576°N 118.2919°W
- Capacity: 800
- Type: movie

Construction
- Built: 1921
- Opened: 1922
- Expanded: 1930
- Closed: c. 1958
- Demolished: before 1985
- Architects: Walker & Eisen (1921); Richard D. King (1930)

Roosevelt Theatre, also known as Chotiner's Parisian Theatre and Fox Parisian Theatre, was a movie theater located in Los Angeles, California, United States.

== History ==
Roosevelt Theatre, designed by Walker & Eisen, was built in 1921 and opened in 1922. The building was originally one story and the theater had a capacity of 800.

The Chotiner Company leased the building in 1930, after which Richard D. King added a second story and also remodeled the theater in the art deco style. The theater's name changed to Chotiner's Parisian Theatre after the remodel.

In 1938, the theater obtained an elephant and paraded it down Vermont Avenue in conjunction with the screening of Gunga Din.

The theater was later purchased by Fox West Coast Theaters, who renamed the theater Fox Parisian Theatre. It closed c. 1958, after which a neighboring restaurant expanded into the building. The building was demolished sometime before 1985.
