= La Brea Theatre =

Former movie theatre in Los Angeles, California, United States

Coordinates: 34°03′33″N 118°20′44″W

The La Brea Theatre, also known as Chotiner's La Brea, Fox La Brea, Art La Brea and Toho La Brea was a single-screen movie theater in Los Angeles, California at 857 S. La Brea Avenue. The theatre was notable for being one of the few movie theatres showing Japanese films in the United States after World War II. It opened in 1926 with a capacity of 1,200, later reduced to 900.

The theatre was built initially as part of the "Chotiner's" movie chain. It became part of the Fox theatre chain. It closed in 1954, and re-opened in 1960 as the Art La Brea after a US$70,000 renovation. The 1960 renovation reduced the number of seats to 640. Later in the 1960s, the theatre was taken over by the Toho company of Japan and used to screen its films and other Japanese films directly, without a distributor. The Toho company also took over cinemas in San Francisco and New York City.

The building was designed by Richard D. King. The architecture used numerous gothic arches over the doorways and second floor windows. The main lobby's exterior and second floor architecture was reminiscent of a steeple, however it did not have a spire. The building still stands today, and is used as a church.
