= Redwine Building =

Office building in Los Angeles, California

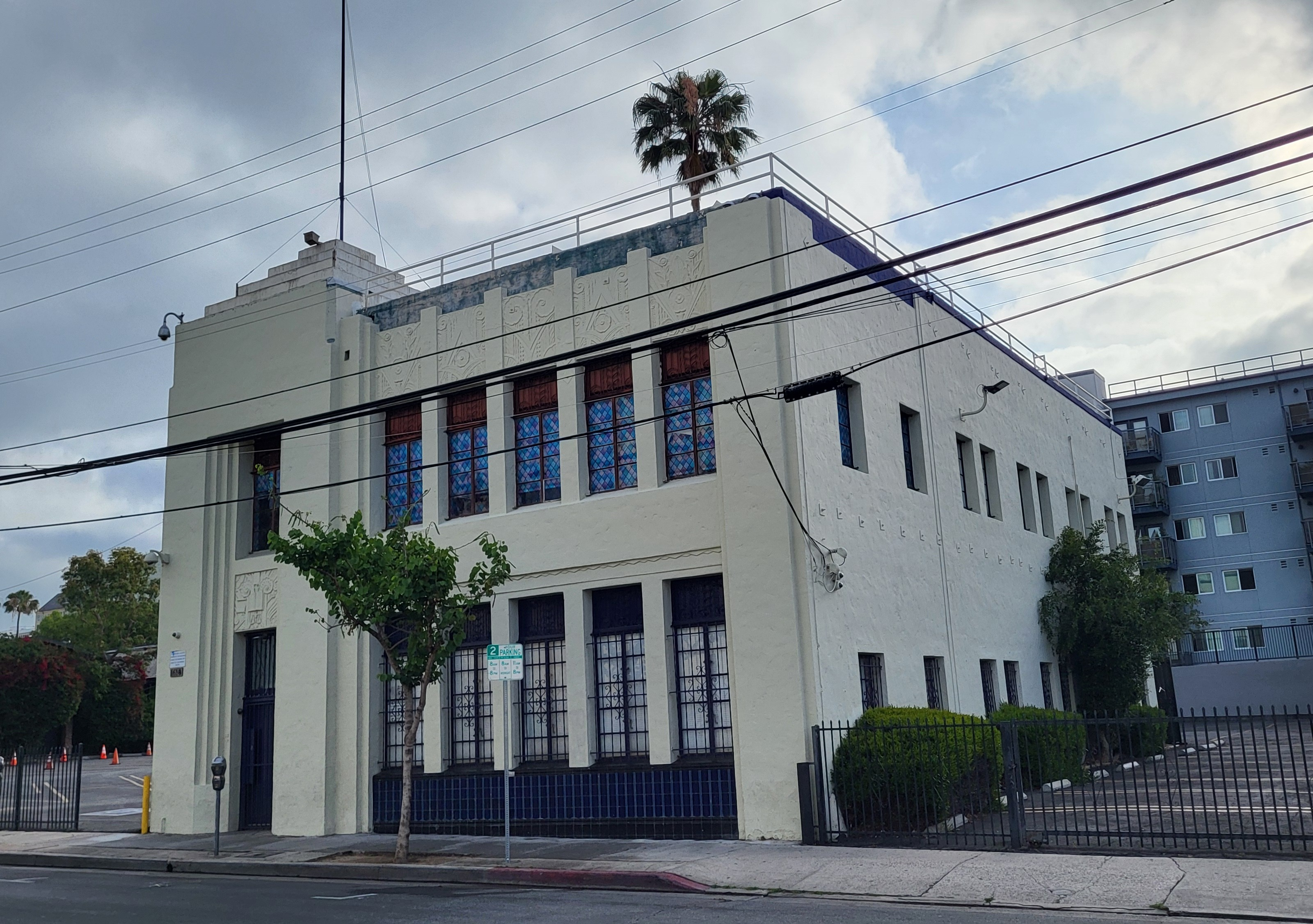
- The building in 2026
- Interactive map of the Redwine Building area

General information
- Architectural style: Art Deco
- Location: 1618 North Las Palmas Ave, Hollywood, Los Angeles, California
- Coordinates: 34.1005°N 118.3359°W
- Named for: Hiram G. Redwine
- Completed: 1931

Design and construction
- Architect: Richard Douglas King

Los Angeles Historic-Cultural Monument
- Designated: May 18, 2016
- Reference no.: 1114

Redwine Building is a historic two-story office building at 1618 North Las Palmas Ave in Hollywood, Los Angeles, California.

== History ==
Redwine Building was designed by Richard Douglas King and constructed by May and Grimwood for attorney Hiram G. Redwine in 1931. Redwine's family residence was originally located on the site.

Once opened, the building served as offices for Redwine and other companies (including at one point Shell Oil) and as a meeting place for various organizations. The building suffered minor fire damage in 1935, the interior was modified in 1937, and the parapet was modified for seismic reasons in 1955.

Redwine died in 1963 but the building stayed under his family's ownership until it was sold in 1977. The building was sold again in 1987, 2006, and 2013.

In 2015, the building was nominated by Charles J. Fisher to become a Los Angeles Historic-Cultural Monument. Both Hollywood Heritage and the Los Angeles Conservancy supported the nomination, which was accepted the following year.

== Architecture and design ==
Redwine Building is rectangular in plan, made of brick with stucco cladding, and designed in the Art Deco style. Character defining features of the building include:

- a highly ornamented front façade
- a stepped pyramid tower with a flagpole above the off-center front entrance
- vertical emphasis through tall steel casement windows, concrete bands that extend from the ground floor windows to above the parapet, and a full height three-tier inset in the entryway
- decorative transoms above the second-floor windows that feature art deco designs and Freemason symbols
- a transom over the entrance that features scales of justice, a gavel, and an open book
- cast concrete artwork and decorative grille work that reference it
- a flat rolled asphalt roof

The interior features a main staircase, individual office doors featuring single light-obscured glass panels, and a second-story conference room lit by skylights.

At some point, the main entrance was moved to the rear of the building, with the front entrance converted to an emergency exit.

== See also ==
- List of Los Angeles Historic-Cultural Monuments in Hollywood
