= Richard D. King (architect) =

American architect

Richard Douglas King
- Born: December 31, 1879; Jackson, Tennessee
- Died: July 31, 1945 (aged 65); Los Angeles County, California
- Resting place: Inglewood Park Cemetery
- Occupation: Architect
- Spouse: Margaret P. King
- Children: 1
- Buildings: Villa Riviera; Hollywood Professional; Redwine Building

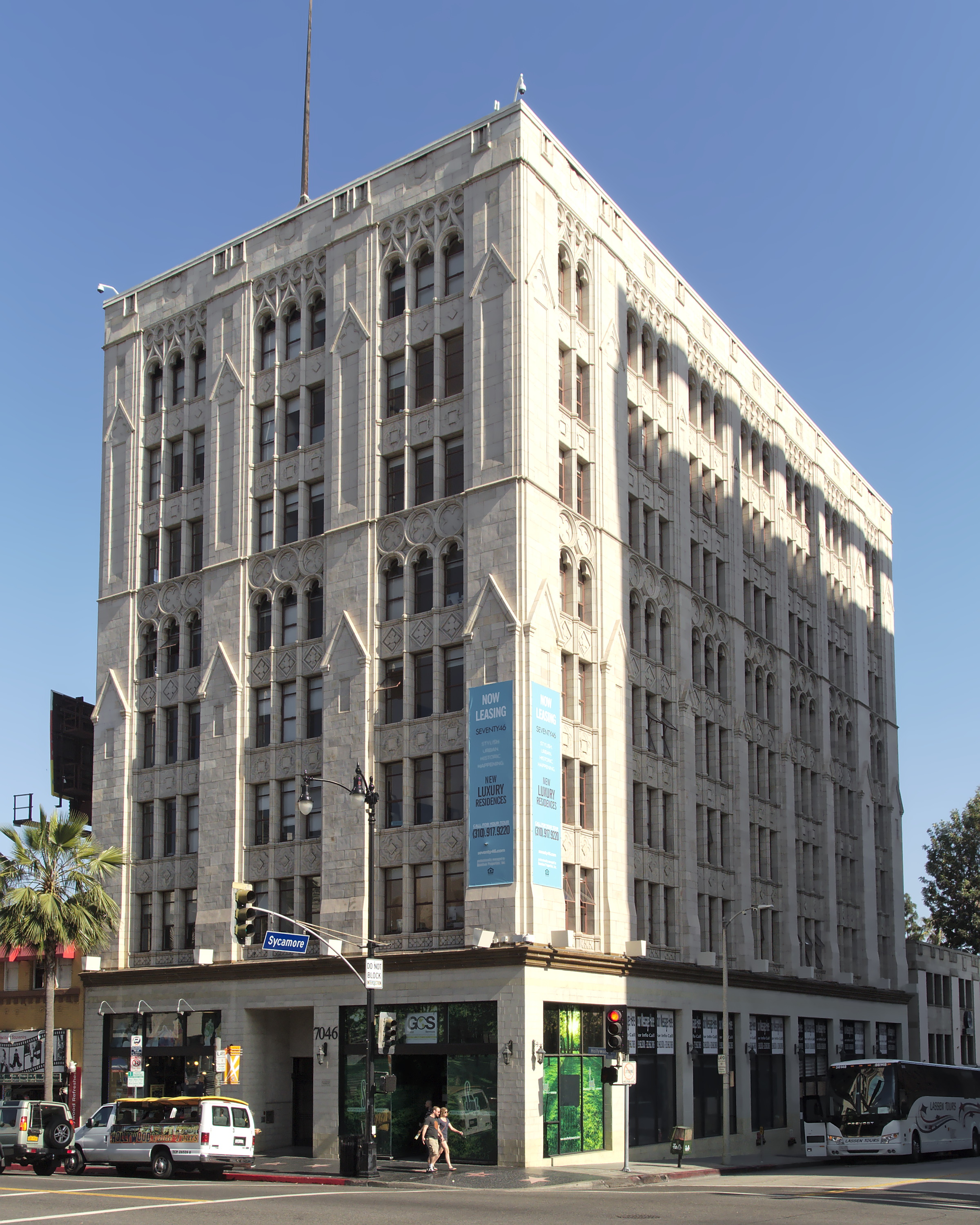
Hollywood Professional Building

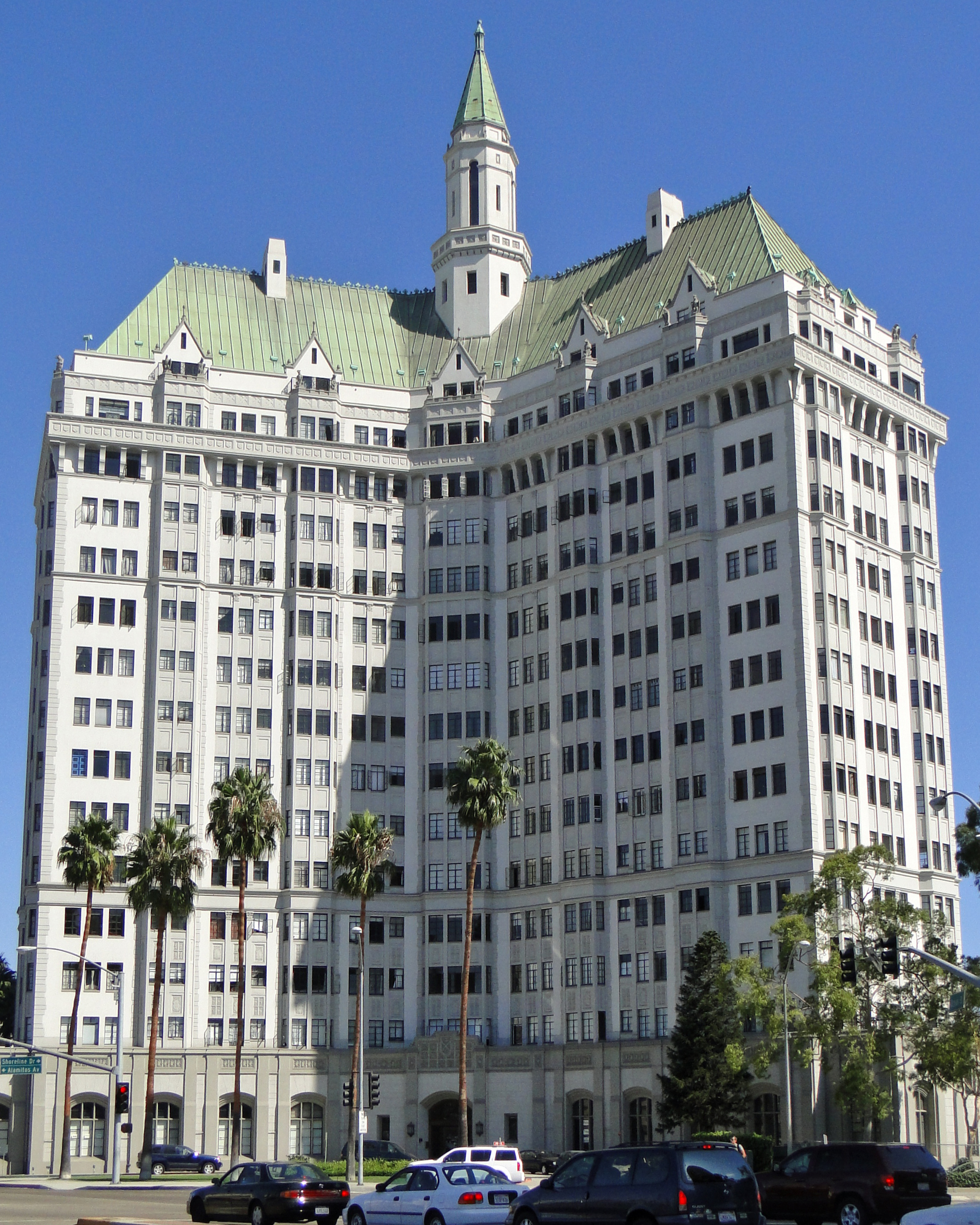
Villa Riviera

Richard Douglas King (1879–1945) was an American architect known for his work in southern California.

== Biography ==
Richard Douglas King was born on December 31, 1879 in Jackson, Tennessee. His father was a miller and his mother a music teacher.

King worked as a hardware store clerk in Helena, Arkansas c. 1900, and by 1909, he was working as a draftsman in Sacramento for the state of California. In 1911, he moved to Los Angeles, where first worked as a project manager at Morgan, Walls & Morgan. He partnered with Ellis Wing and Edward C. Taylor the following year and the partnership ended in 1914. King worked as a solo practitioner the rest of his career.

King produced more than 125 works in southern California and he achieved international recognition for Villa Riviera, completed in 1929. He also built his own home in Hermosa Beach in 1917; his office, however, was located in downtown Los Angeles.

King married Margaret P. King and they had one daughter together. He died of a heart attack while inspecting a ship for the Maritime Commission on July 31, 1945; he was buried in Inglewood Park Cemetery.

== List of works ==
=== Los Angeles ===
- Hotel Hayward Annex (1918), NRHP-listed
- Coca Cola bottling plant (1920, demolished prior to 1939)
- Hollywood Professional Building (1922), LAHCM No. 876, NRHP-listed
- Ravenna Theatre (1924)
- La Brea Theatre (1926)
- Apartment building at 1523 N. McCadden Pl. (1928)
- Sparkletts Bottling Plant (1929)
- Roosevelt Theater (1930 remodel and addition)
- Redwine Building (1931), LAHCM No. 1114
- Apartment building at 620 South St. Andrews Place, NRHP-listed
- Children's Hospital of Los Angeles

=== Elsewhere in southern California ===
- Symphony Theatre and Hotel (1923, destroyed 1933), Compton
- Metropolitan Theatre (1923), Hermosa Beach historic landmark
- Villa Riviera (1929), Long Beach Historic Landmark No. 16.52.010, NRHP No. 96000778
- Vernon City Hall

== See also ==
- List of American architects
- List of people from Los Angeles
