= Villa Riviera =

- U.S. National Register of Historic Places
- Long Beach Historic Landmark
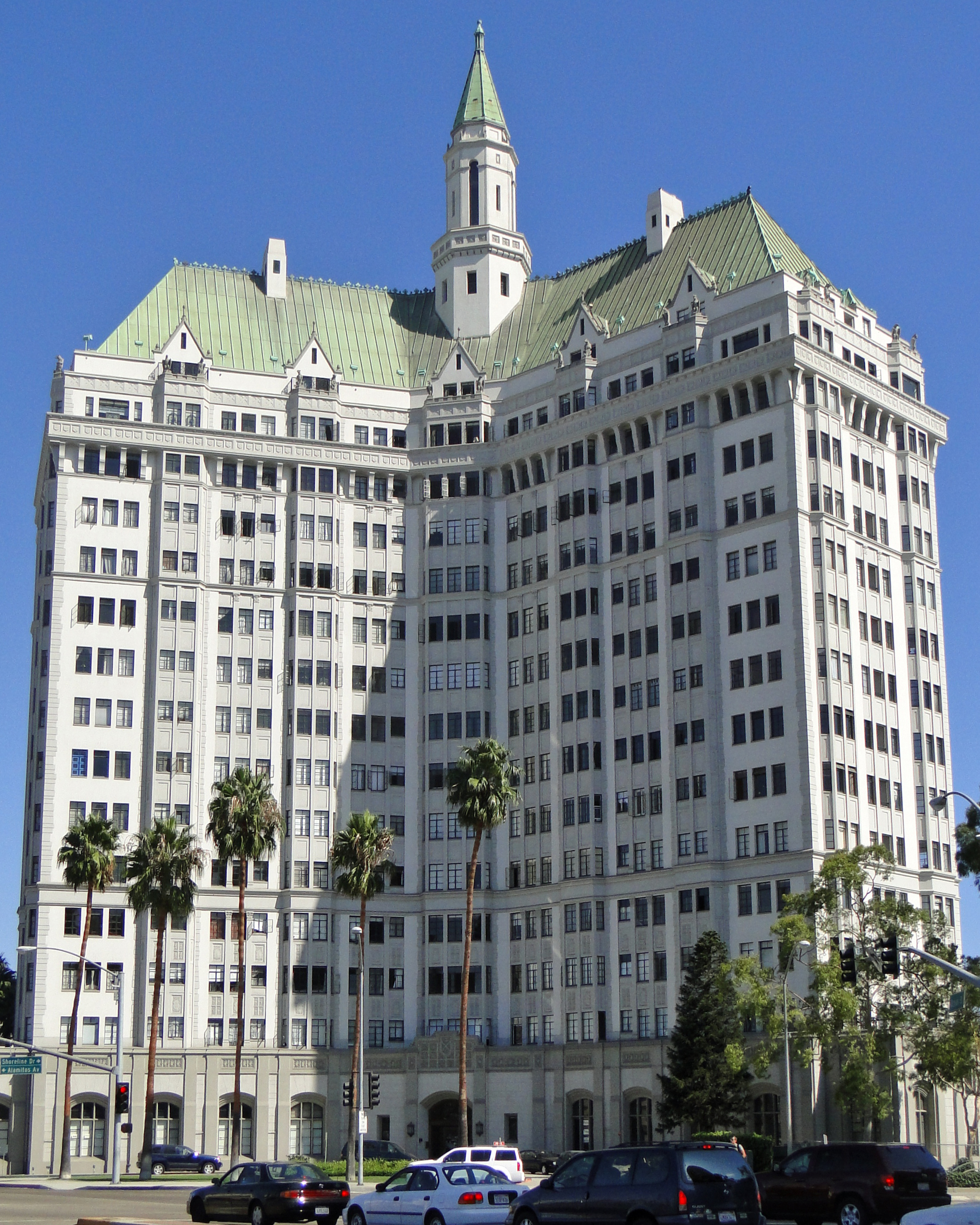

- Location within the Los Angeles metropolitan area
- Location: 800 East Ocean Boulevard, Long Beach, California
- Coordinates: 33°45′57.1″N 118°10′57.6″W
- Built: 1928
- Architect: Richard D. King
- Architectural style: French Châteauesque, Gothic Revival
- Website: https://www.villariviera.net/
- NRHP reference No.: 96000778
- Added to NRHP: July 25, 1996

Villa Riviera is a registered historic building on Ocean Boulevard in the Alamitos Beach neighborhood of Long Beach, California, United States. The building was an "own-your-own" apartment building and each unit was sold fully furnished. In those days, Apartment-Hotels were apartment buildings featuring full service hotel amenities. The Villa Riviera provided maid service, valets, doormen, concierge, and managers on duty to cater to the needs of residents. The Villa Riviera was completed, and the owners moved in, by the end of 1928, enjoying a grand opening party January 1929.

From the time of its completion in 1928 through to 1955, it was the second-tallest building, and the tallest private building, in Southern California. The 16-story Châteauesque building has been called the city's "most elegant landmark" and a building that "has helped define the city." The building was added to the National Register of Historic Places in 1996 and is currently used as condominiums with approximately 134 units, including three penthouse apartments occupying the areas on the 15th and 16th floors of the building, complete with grotesques outside the 16th floor windows.

== Description and architecture ==
Built in 1928 at a cost of $2.75 million, the Villa Riviera is a 16-story French Gothic Building. The steel-framed structure is topped with a steeply pitched verdigris copper roof. The building was designed by architect Richard D. King who won a grand prize at an international contest for the design that he referred to as "Tudor Gothic." The structure features fierce-looking grotesques perched along the ridges of the higher floors. The four styles of grotesques are: a bear holding a shield, a cougar, an eagle, and a winged chimera featuring a wolf's head and a bird's body. They adorn each uppermost corner of the building and both sides of the 16th floor balconies overlooking the city and ocean. The building was also equipped with luxurious features, including a roof garden, the "Umbrella Room" lobby, high-speed elevators, "vacuum-type steam heating," and a 100-car garage replete with car elevator to aid the staff valets. There was a private beach and food stand for the residents and their guests to enjoy.

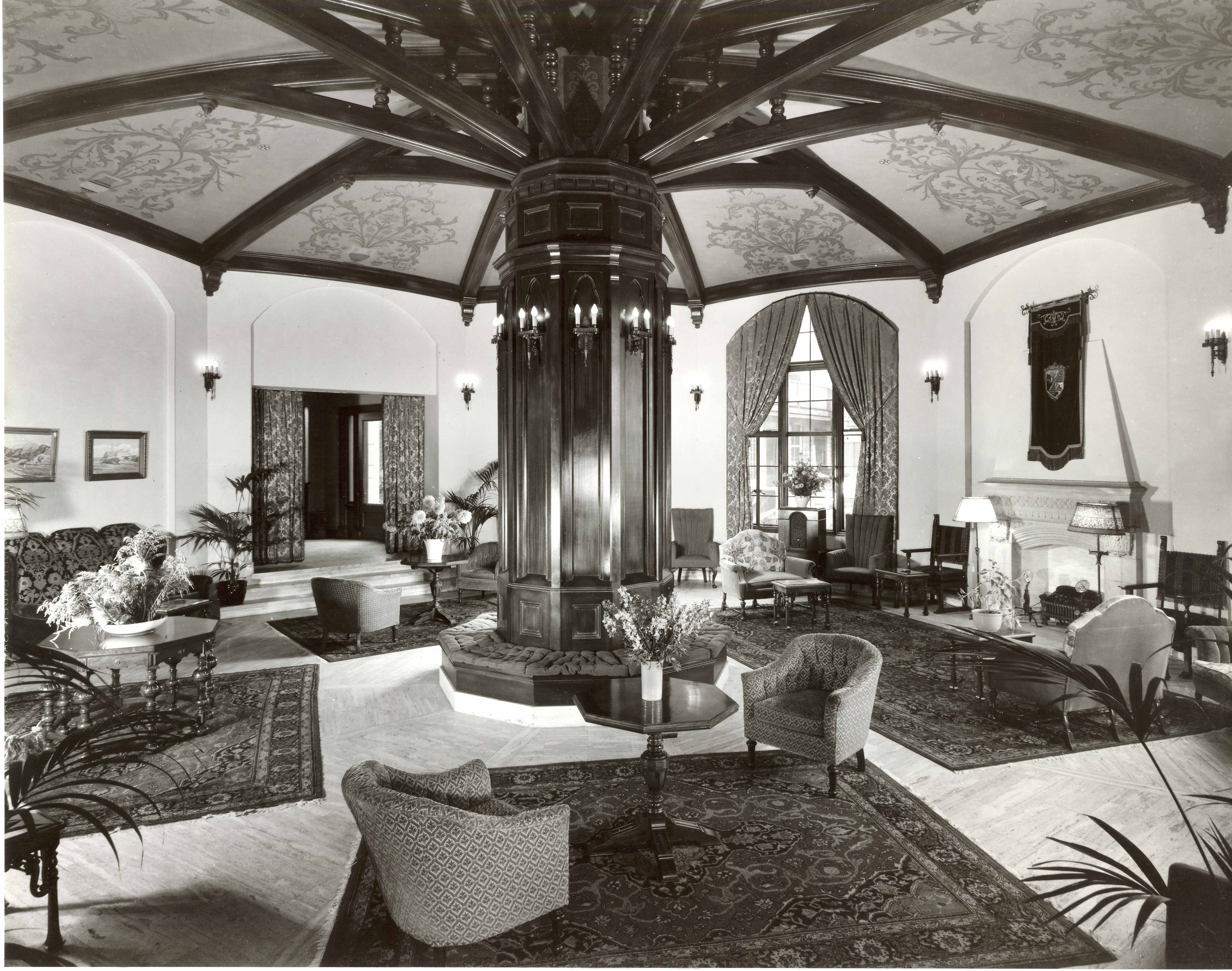

The Villa Riviera was originally built as a luxury residential cooperative. The 1928 promotional brochure for the building noted :

In its exterior design, VILLA RIVIERA will be distinctively individual. In general, it will savor of the majestic Tudor Gothic, but with a marked feeling of French and Italian Renaissance, all blended into a composite grace of line which will overshadow any single decorative detail. ... Within VILLA RIVIERA will provide its one hundred and thirty owner-residents and their families with every comfort, luxury and modern convenience afforded by the finest hotel or the perfectly appointed individual home.

When the Villa Riviera was completed, the 277-foot high structure was the second tallest in the region—surpassed only by Los Angeles City Hall. Until the 1950s, it remained the second-tallest building in Southern California and "the tallest private building in Southern California."

== History ==
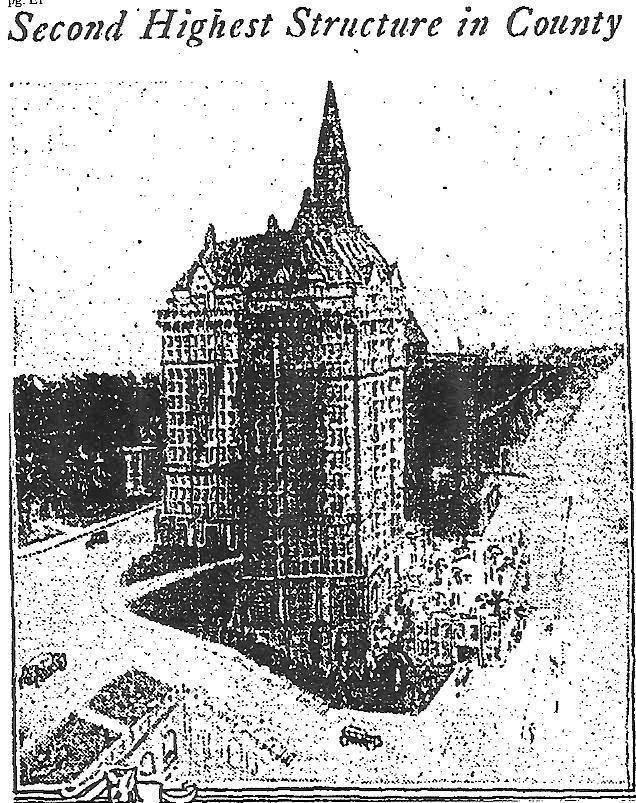
Drawing of the Villa Riviera published by the Los Angeles Times in 1928

Shortly after the Villa Riviera opened, the Great Depression hit, and the demand for luxury cooperative apartments declined. While some original owners gave up their apartments, others stayed. The buildings control and management was ceded to the mortgage company renting many of the apartments.

The most prominent construction engineering firm in the country, McClintic-Marshall, structurally designed and built the high-rise’s heavy duty Bethlehem steel skeleton. One thousand tons of steel, heavier than required at that time, was used. They used foundation a revolutionary new method designed to be more stable, faster, and safer, Rather than simply digging a foundation hole, they dug a large central trench down to stable soil with radiating perpendicular side trenches radiating out which were all filled with concrete. On top of that base, they poured forty-five wide stepped concrete bases to support the vertical heavy duty steel beams. All structural steel was then encased in concrete. "After tests made in the California Institute of Technology., McClintic-Marshall engineers stated in substance that the earthquake resisting steel work specified for use in (the) Villa Riviera, and subsequently installed, was the equivalent, if not, the superior in strength of any ever put into a steel frame structure in the West." The Villa Riviera is considered among the earliest examples of skyscrapers designed for seismic safety. After completing the Villa in 1928, McClintic-Marshall structurally designed many significant buildings and bridges including, the Empire State Building (1930) and the Golden Gate Bridge (1933).

The 1933 Long Beach earthquake, which occurred on March 10, caused significant damage across Southern California. The earthquake, with a magnitude of 6.4, resulted in the destruction or severe damage of about 70 schools and over 120 buildings, including homes and businesses in the area. Thousands of other buildings were also damaged to varying degrees. Most of the destruction was concentrated in Long Beach, but other parts of Los Angeles and Orange Counties were also affected.

Though shaken, the high-rise Villa Riviera suffered no structural or significant damage due to its construction, even though it was the 2nd tallest building in the area affected by the quake. A newspaper account described the reaction of the Villa Riviera occupants to the earthquake as follows:

"The Villa Riviera, a 16-story apartment hotel, where most of the high-ranking officers of the Navy resided, swayed violently but suffered no more than a few cracks and fallen plaster. Admiral Richard H. Leigh, commander-in-chief of the United States fleet, after rushing down the stairway with most of the other 400 occupants and out into the street, returned to his suite around midnight in disdain of the succeeding shocks, which continued through the night. George Kingreet, assistant manager of the Villa Riviera, painted a picture of the hurried exit of the naval notables when the first shock came. 'The elevator stopped and everybody rushed down the stairs and out into the street. The bellboy stuck right on the job and went through the rooms, clearing them of people."'

In 1934, just months after prohibition ended, the Villa Riviera added a new cocktail bar adjacent to the Villa Riviera Cafe, (a fine dining establishment serving breakfast, lunch, and dinner). The cocktail bar featured art deco styling with a beamed barrel roof and half moon shaped bar. Currently the space serves as a Barber Shop. Another post-prohibition addition was the "Oceanic Club" on the 15th floor where patrons drank and danced the night away. It is now a privately owned space.

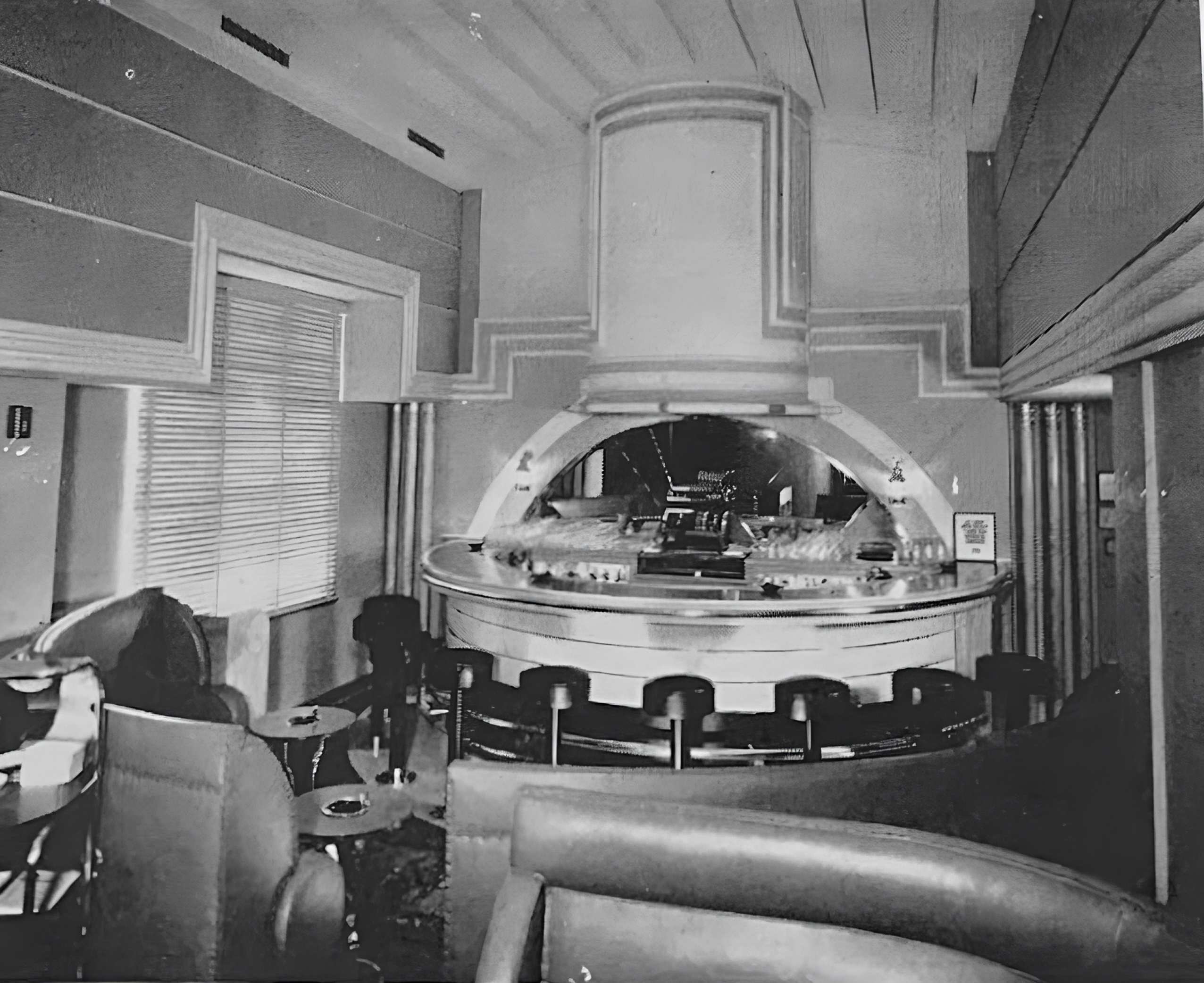

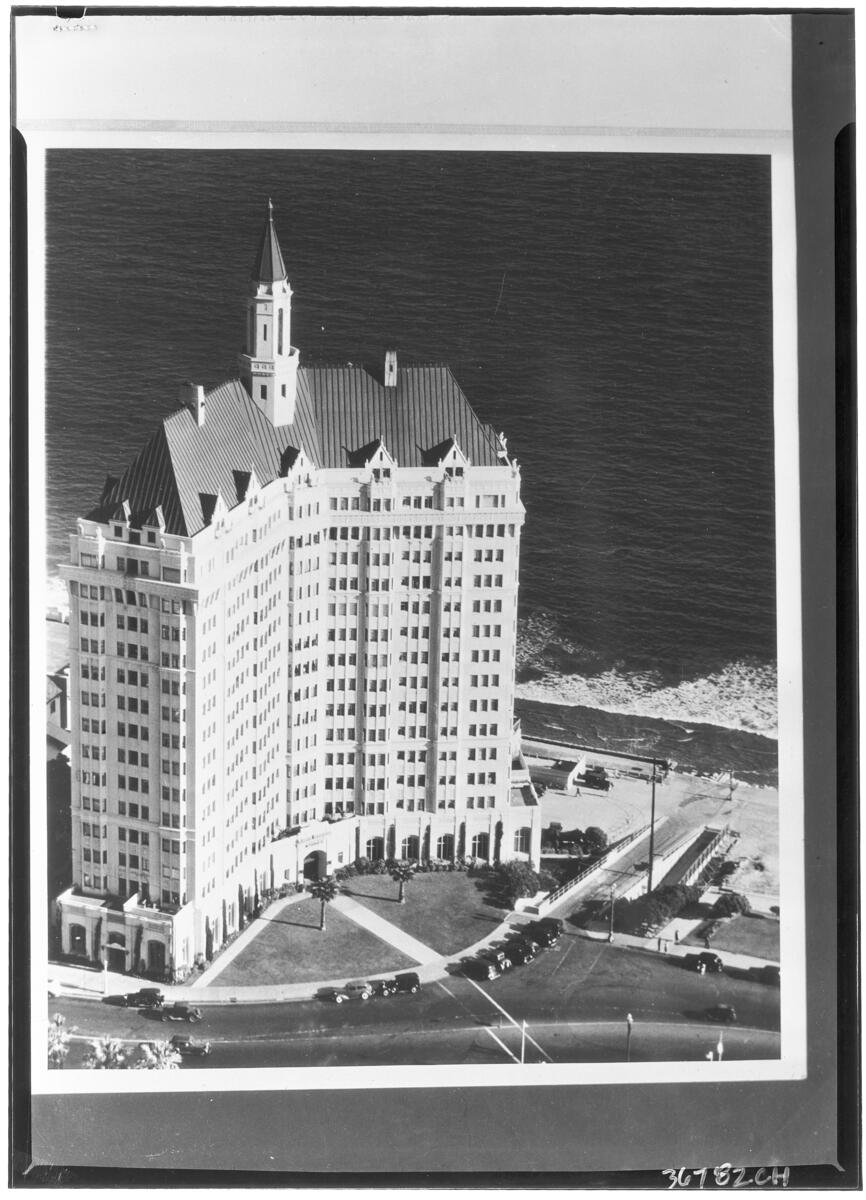
Aerial view of the Villa Riviera, showing the beach before land reclamation, undated

In 1937, silent film star Norma Talmadge and her ex-husband Joseph M. Schenck, president of 20th Century Fox, bought the building for $1.5 million. The Los Angeles Times reported that "the deal was one of the largest realty transactions in Southern California in several years." Talmadge lived in the penthouse for a time.

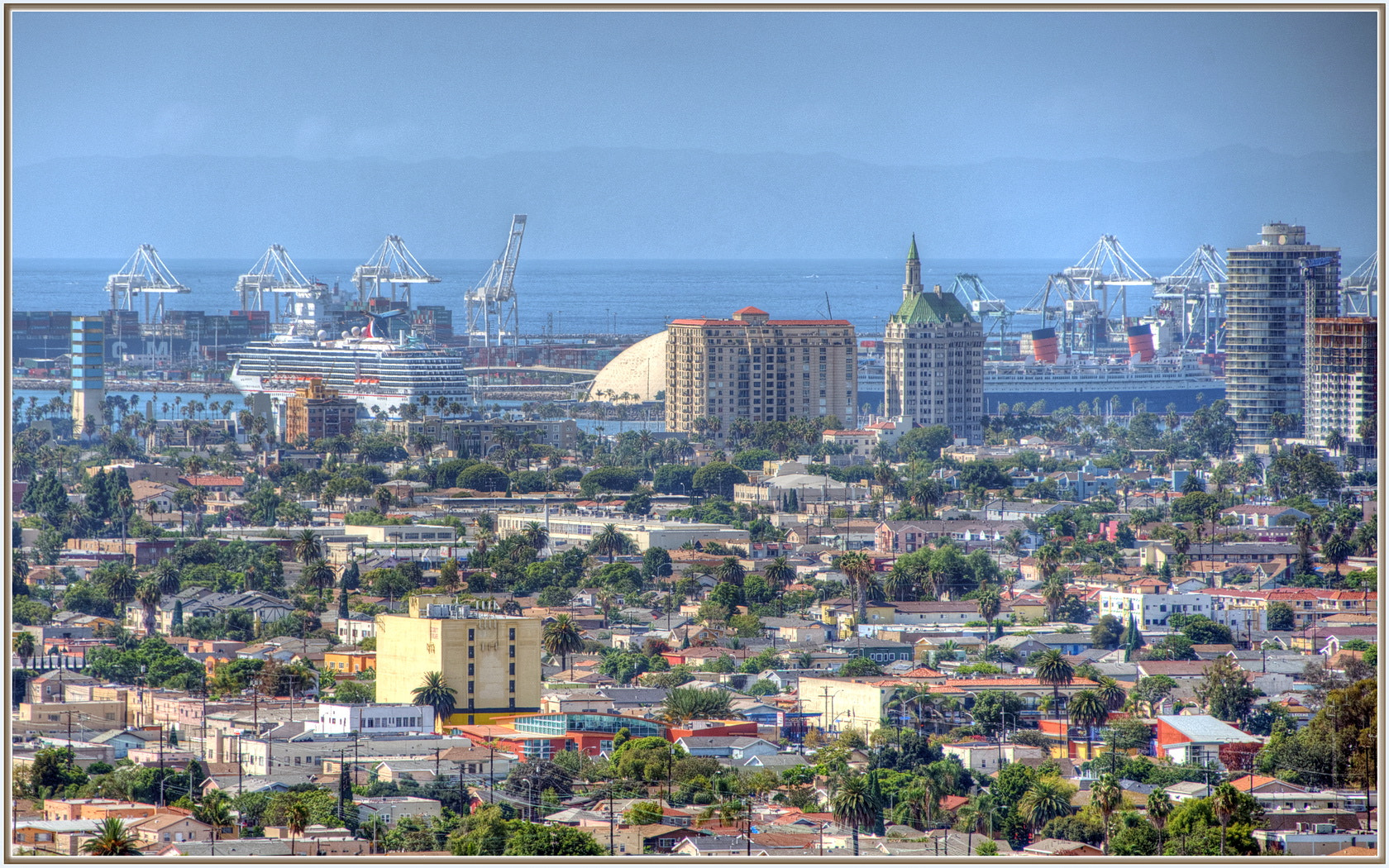
The Villa Riviera with the Port of Long Beach and Santa Catalina Island in the background

Since 1932, when the US Navy brought the Pacific Fleet to Long Beach, the Villa Riviera was known as the "Home of Admirals" as it served as the home of many of the senior officers of the United States Pacific Fleet. During World War II, several U.S. Navy officers lived at the Villa Riviera.[1] The turret-like tower atop the building was used by the Navy to spot enemy ships off the Southern California coast. In 1955, the building was purchased by the Morris Hotel chain for $1.75 million. Within months, the new owner converted the building to its original use as a residential "own-your-own" cooperative building. Despite the conversion, the owners kept the hotel's cocktail lounge, beauty salon, coffee shop, dining room and valet service for the convenience of the cooperative residents.

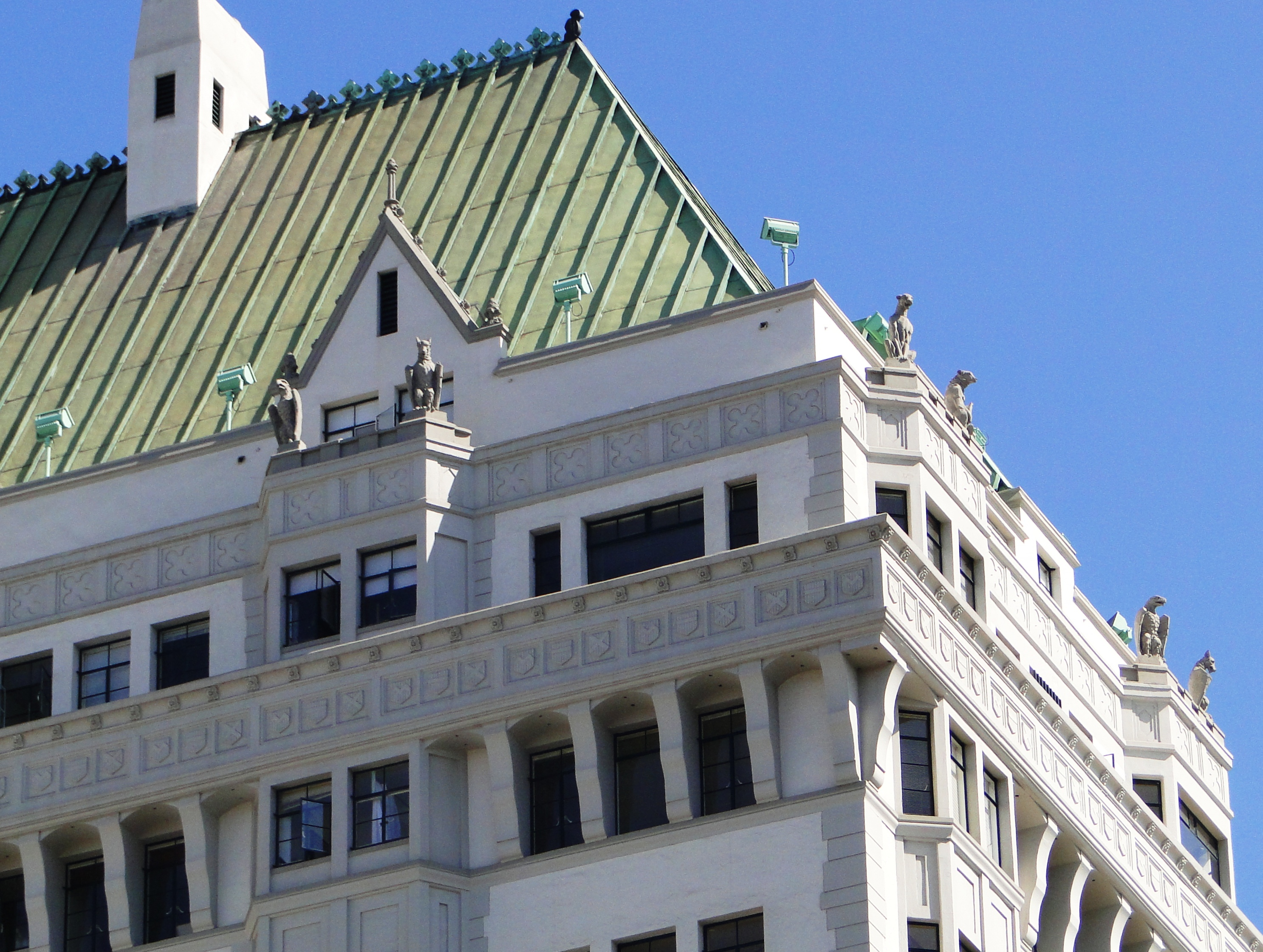
Grotesques atop the Villa Riviera

The first Miss Universe Pageant was held in Long Beach in 1952 and the Villa Riviera provided the backdrop to many of the photos and the parade on Ocean Boulevard. Marine Corps and Navy officers acted as escorts, one for each contestant. In 1952, George Allen announced the Villa Riviera would seek tourist business and add hotel operations to Villa's many long term apartment residents and owners. This was a short lived experiment as the Villa was converted back to a co-op building in January 1955. All apartments were sold to private owners.

A newspaper feature in 1965 reported that apartments at the Villa Riviera sold "for anywhere from $10,000 to $40,000 according to size." In 1969, Long Beach residents were surprised to learn that the city had condemned the Villa Riviera as a fire hazard. After the violations were corrected, the building emerged from the condemnation in 1971.

In 1991, the building was converted to condominiums. In 1996, the building was added to the National Register of Historic Places. In 2003, the Los Angeles Times called it "Long Beach's most elegant landmark", a building that "has helped define the city for nearly three-quarters of a century."

In 2007 and 2008, the Homeowners Association conducted a $4 million facelift that included restoration of certain historical elements, including replacement of six of the original grotesques that had been removed.

In 2022, the Villa Riviera's North Penthouse was restored to its 1928 glory by the current owners.

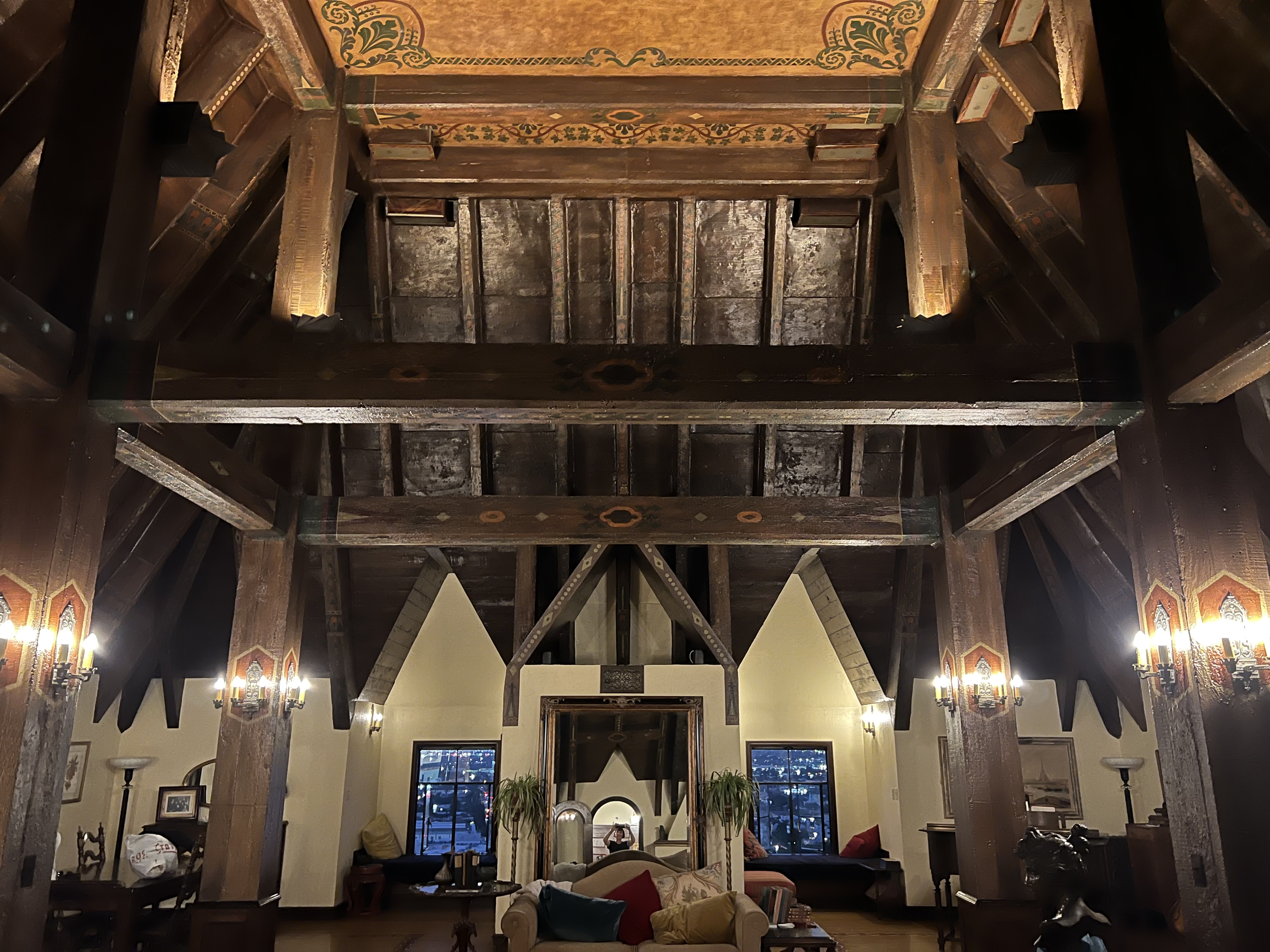
The North Penthouse Amusement Room

The North Penthouse was originally owned by Clyde and Jessie McWhinney. They purchased three penthouse apartments to be reimagined as a single grand penthouse. (All the five apartments on the 15th floor called "The Penthouse House" Floor and were two-story apartments, each had an internal staircases to access additional rooms on the 16th floor. Only three Penthouse apartments remain and only the Petite Penthouse has its original floor plan.) The architect, Richard D. King, designed the largest penthouse for the McWhinney's--a grand completely custom apartment which included: three bedrooms, private foyer, five bathrooms, live-in maid's quarters & bath, living room, dining room, study, two kitchens, and an Amusement Room replete with a Wurlitzer Pipe Organ. The Amusement Room had been used various ways over the decades—as a private residence, a nightclub called the Oceanic Club, the "Chapel in the Sky", an event space, before being returned to a private residence in 1952. Most of the original 15th floor spaces were converted into separate apartments sometime after 1938. The upstairs bedroom and "Fish" bathroom of the Architect's personal Penthouse were connected to the Amusement Room in 1968 creating its current floor plan. The North Penthouse's "Amusement Room" (per the original blueprints and 1928 photographs) still possesses its soaring two story ceilings, original stenciled beams and faux wood effects, wood floor, fireplace and original fireplace screen, and original art deco bathroom tile. Fortunately, in all those incarnations, no one ever saw fit to redecorate, making it the Amusement Room only space used publicly, while maintaining the architect's original vision. The rest of the grand North Penthouse has been reimagined to reflect the amazing gothic revival style of 1928 in harmony with the Amusement Room in design, decor, and scale.

== See also ==
- List of City of Long Beach historic landmarks
- National Register of Historic Places listings in Los Angeles County, California
