= Bryan Scott (quarterback) =

American gridiron football player (born 1995)

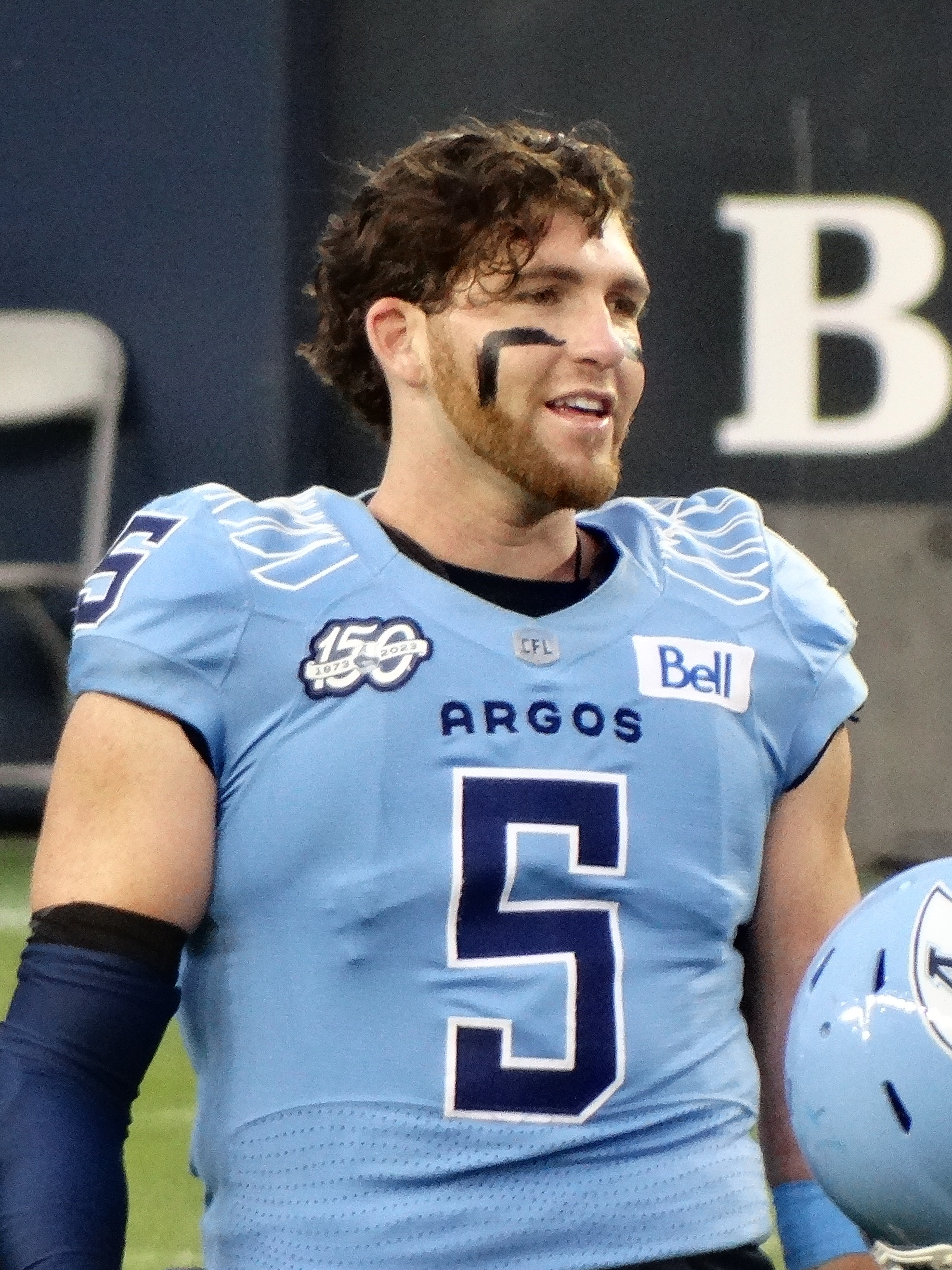
- Scott with the Toronto Argonauts in 2023

Profile
- Position: Quarterback

Personal information
- Born: August 17, 1995 (age 31); Rolling Hills, California, U.S.
- Listed height: 6 ft 2 in (1.88 m)
- Listed weight: 220 lb (100 kg)

Career information
- High school: Palos Verdes (Palos Verdes Estates, California)
- College: Occidental (2013–2016)
- NFL draft: 2017: undrafted

Career history
- BC Lions (2017)*; Edmonton Eskimos (2019–2020)*; Philadelphia Stars (2022); Vegas Vipers (2023)*; Toronto Argonauts (2023–2024); Winnipeg Blue Bombers (2024)*; Toronto Argonauts (2024)
- * Offseason or practice squad member only

Awards and highlights
- Grey Cup Champion (2024); IFAF U-19 World Cup gold medal (2014); IFAF U-19 World Cup MVP (2014); SCIAC Newcomer of the Year (2013); 2× First-team All-SCIAC (2015, 2016); SCIAC Player of the Year (2016)

Career USFL statistics
- Passing attempts: 85
- Passing completions: 60
- Completion percentage: 70.6
- TD–INT: 5–2
- Passing yards: 558
- QBR: 98.1
- Stats at CFL.ca

Bryan James Scott (born August 17, 1995) is an American professional football quarterback. He most recently played for the Toronto Argonauts of the Canadian Football League (CFL). He played college football at Occidental College. He also played for the Philadelphia Stars of the United States Football League (USFL).

== Early life ==
Bryan Scott grew up in Rolling Hills, California. He was raised by his parents Robert and Leslie Scott, and has a sister, Lauren.

Scott played for Palos Verdes High School. He became the starting quarterback early in the 2012 season. During the 2012 season, he passed for a total of 1,988 yards. In 2012, with Scott in the starting position, Palos Verdes won the Bay League title and the CIF Southern Section title for the first time in 47 years.

== College career ==
From 2013 to 2017, Scott attended Occidental College, in California, majoring in urban environmental policy. In his true-freshman season at Occidental, Scott was selected for the SCIAC All-Conference Second Team, and named Newcomer of the Year. In the last game of his freshman year Scott passed for 473 yards and six touchdowns, setting single game records at Occidental in each category. In 2014 Scott was selected to play for the U-19 USA National Football Team. Scott led Team USA to a Gold Medal finish at the IFAF World Championship in Kuwait. Scott brought his team back from a 14–12 deficit at halftime, with four consecutive passing touchdowns, to capture the Gold Medal. He was awarded with the IFAF tournament's MVP award. Later, during the 2014 season, Scott was selected for the SCIAC All-Conference First Team after leading the conference in every major passing category. During his tenure at Occidental, Scott set nine school records and three Southern California Intercollegiate Athletic Conference records: career passing yards (9073), completions (763), and total offense (9475). He was named first-team all-conference quarterback, Occidental's team MVP, and Occidental's team captain in the 2016 season. That season, he was also named SCIAC Player of the Year. In 2016, Scott's final season with Occidental, he passed for over 3000 yards in nine games played with 27 touchdowns. It was also the season that he became the all-time passing yardage leader for both Occidental College and the SCIAC, with 9073 yards, 77 touchdowns, and 22 interceptions in 33 career games.

=== College statistics ===
College career statistics
| | | Passing | | | | | | | | Rushing | | | | |
| Year | GP | Comp | Att | Pct | Yds | TD | INT | LG | Rating | Att | Yds | Avg | TD | LG |
|---|---|---|---|---|---|---|---|---|---|---|---|---|---|---|
| 2013 | 7 | 101 | 187 | 54.0% | 1,476 | 11 | 6 | 76 | 133.3 | 35 | 102 | 2.9 | 1 | 17 |
| 2014 | 8 | 171 | 271 | 63.1% | 1,998 | 17 | 5 | 62 | 142.0 | 38 | 109 | 2.9 | 0 | 42 |
| 2015 | 8 | 238 | 366 | 65.0% | 2,541 | 22 | 6 | 60 | 139.9 | 29 | -27 | -0.9 | 4 | 51 |
| 2016 | 9 | 253 | 381 | 66.4% | 3,058 | 27 | 5 | 84 | 154.6 | 56 | 218 | 3.9 | 8 | 45 |
| Totals | 32 | 763 | 1,205 | 63.3% | 9,073 | 77 | 22 | 84 | 144.0 | 158 | 402 | 2.5 | 13 | 51 |

== Professional career ==
=== BC Lions ===
In March 2017, Scott attended USC's Pro Day workout, completing 62 of 64 passes with one drop. Scott signed with the BC Lions of the Canadian Football League (CFL) on April 18, but was released on May 1. Scott had a rookie mini-camp tryout with his hometown team, the Los Angeles Rams, following the 2017 NFL draft.

=== The Spring League (first stint) ===
In April 2018, Scott participated in The Spring League, where he was named Player of the Game for two games. His performance led a workout with the Kansas City Chiefs. In May 2018, he tried out at rookie mini-camps with the Chiefs and Atlanta Falcons.

=== Edmonton Eskimos ===
Scott was signed to the practice roster of the Edmonton Eskimos on October 8, 2019. He was released from the practice roster and signed to a futures contract for the 2020 season on October 14, 2019. After the CFL canceled the 2020 season due to the COVID-19 pandemic, Scott chose to opt-out of his contract with the Eskimos on August 31, 2020.

=== The Spring League (second stint) ===
Scott was selected by the Generals of The Spring League (TSL) during its player selection draft on October 12, 2020. He won the starting quarterback competition against Zach Mettenberger. Scott led the Generals to an undefeated 4-0 season and the 2020 championship, with a win over the Aviators 37-14. He went 22-of-32, 264 yards, and three touchdowns passing, 25 yards rushing and a touchdown, and won his second TSL MVP, and becoming the only quarterback to throw for 1000 yards and complete 10 touchdowns in a TSL season. Scott was awarded as the MVP of The Spring League Championship in 2020. Scott worked out for the Indianapolis Colts in February 2021.

=== Philadelphia Stars ===
On February 22, 2022, Scott was drafted third overall by the Philadelphia Stars of the United States Football League (USFL). After the second week of play, Scott led the league in passing yards (474), touchdowns (four), and completion percentage (70.8%). He was transferred to the inactive roster on May 5, with ankle and knee injuries. Scott was placed on injured reserve on June 1. His Stars jersey was included as part of a USFL exhibit at the Pro Football Hall of Fame.

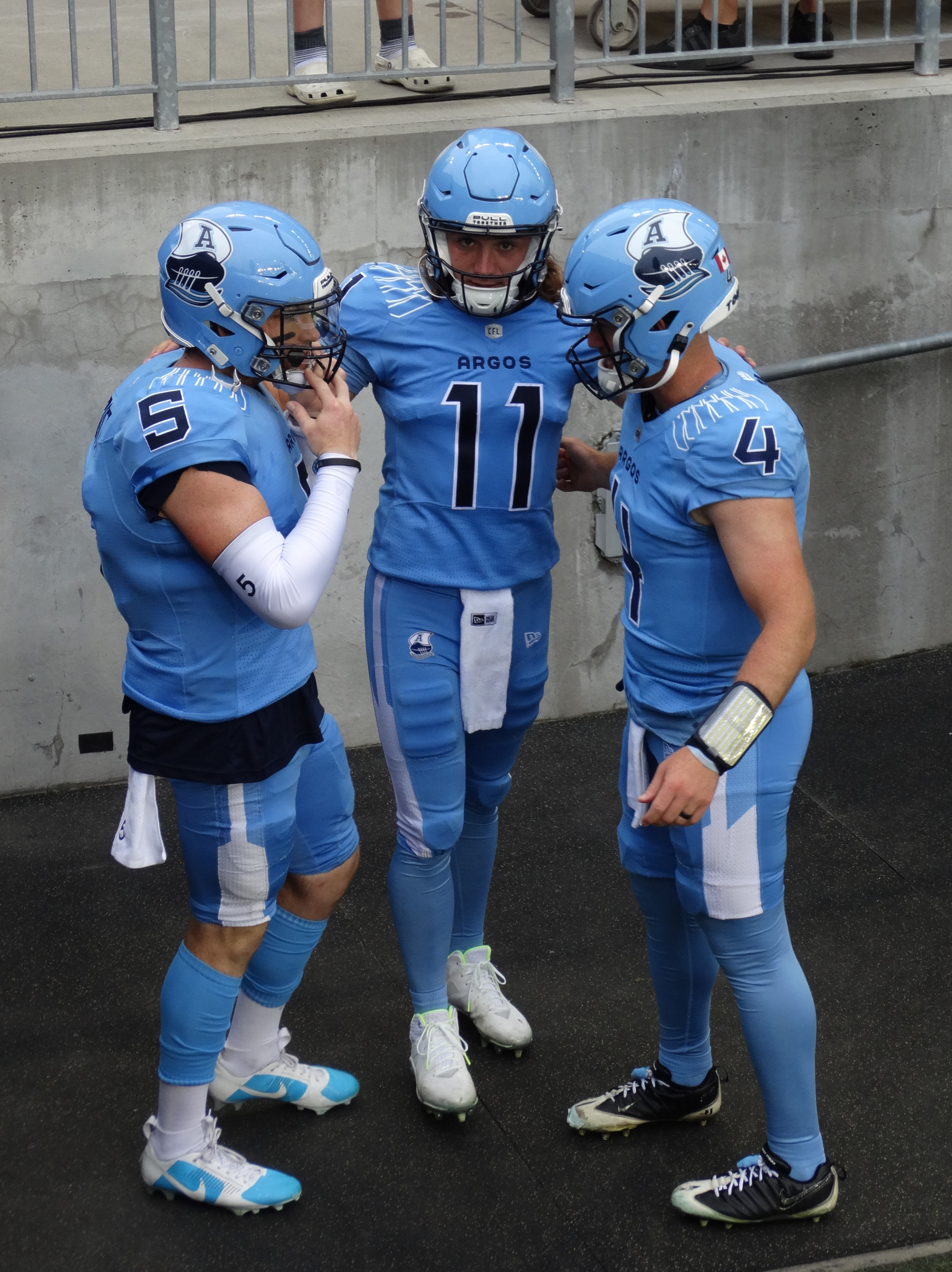
Scott (left) with the Argonauts in 2024

=== Vegas Vipers ===
Scott was assigned to the Vegas Vipers of the XFL on January 1, 2023, after his USFL contract expired. He was released on January 30.

=== Toronto Argonauts (first stint) ===
Scott signed with the Toronto Argonauts of the CFL on March 1, 2023. He dressed in all 18 games in 2023 as the third-string quarterback and had four pass attempts with no completions. In 2024, Scott dressed in the first nine regular season games where he completed five passes out of five attempts for 79 yards and his first CFL touchdown pass. Following the reinstatement of Chad Kelly from suspension, Scott was released on August 20, 2024.

=== Winnipeg Blue Bombers ===
On September 16, 2024, it was announced that Scott had signed a practice roster agreement with the Winnipeg Blue Bombers. He did not play in a game and was released on September 30.

=== Toronto Argonauts (second stint) ===
On November 11, 2024, Scott re-signed with the Argonauts following an injury to Chad Kelly, just prior to the 111th Grey Cup. He dressed as the third-string quarterback in the game and won his first Grey Cup championship as the Argonauts defeated the Blue Bombers 41–24. He became a free agent upon the expiry of his contract on February 11, 2025.

=== Professional statistics ===
Professional statistics (through the end of the most recent complete season)
| Year | Team | Games | | Passing | | | | | | | | Rushing | | | |
| Year | Team | GP | GS | Cmp | Att | Pct | Yds | Y/A | TD | Int | Rtg | Att | Yds | Avg | TD |
|---|---|---|---|---|---|---|---|---|---|---|---|---|---|---|---|
| 2022 | PHI | 3 | 3 | 60 | 85 | 70.6 | 558 | 6.6 | 5 | 2 | 98.1 | 9 | 23 | 2.6 | 1 |
| 2023 | TOR | 18 | 0 | 0 | 4 | 00.0 | 0 | 0 | 0 | 0 | 0 | 0 | 0 | 0 | 0 |
| 2024 | TOR | 9 | 0 | 5 | 5 | 100.0 | 79 | 15.8 | 1 | 0 | 158.3 | 0 | 0 | 0 | 0 |

== Later career ==
Following his retirement from professional football, Scott founded RISE Environmental, an environmental services company specializing in waste transportation, logistics, and recycling. The company continued his family's involvement in the industry, as his father, Bob Scott, had previously co-founded Environmental Recovery Services (EnviroServ).
