= Rancho Del Mar High School =

Coordinates: 33.758257°N 118.358756°W

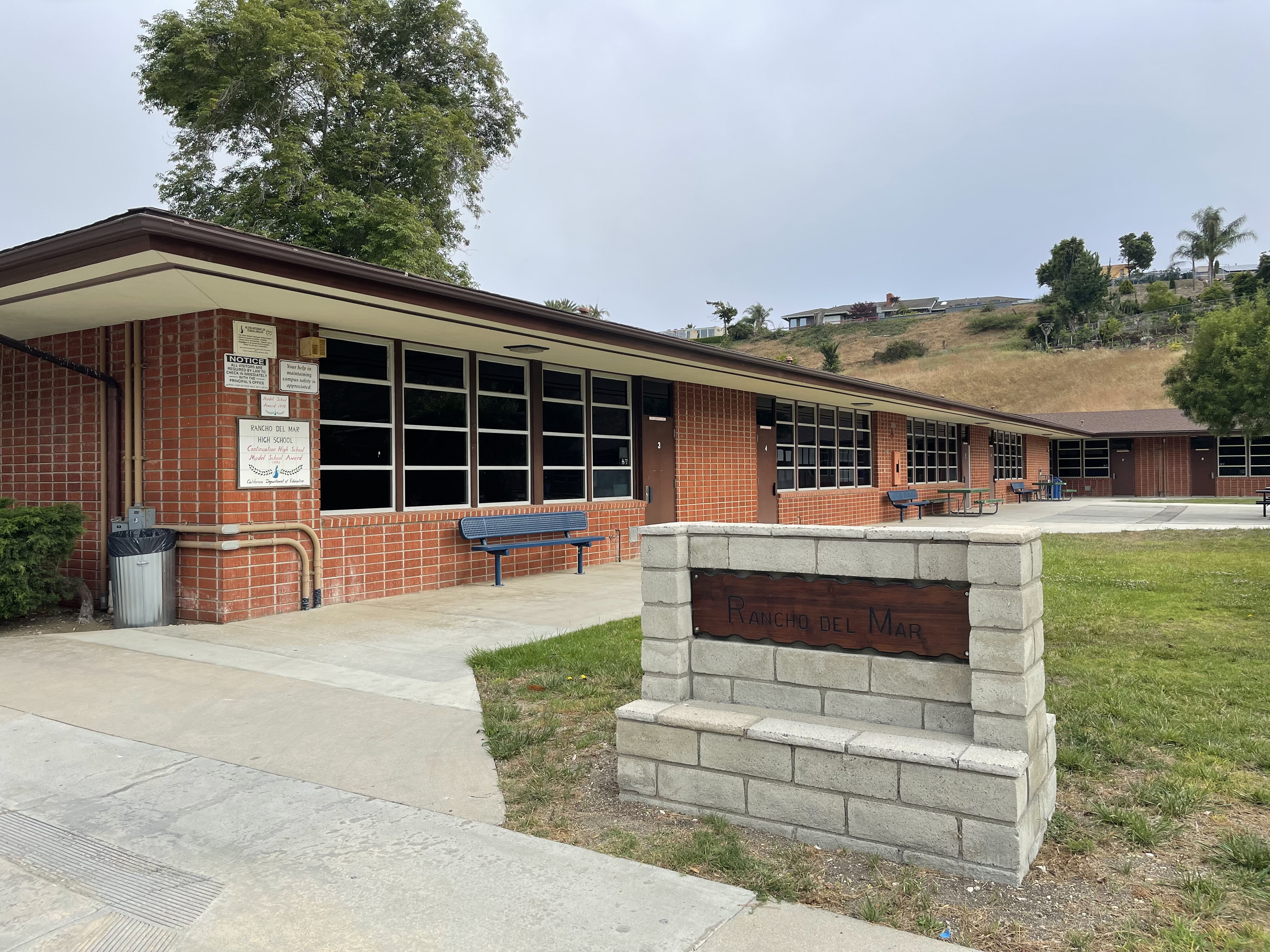

Location
- 38 Crest Road West; Rolling Hills, California 90274; United States

Information
- Principal: Brett Egan
- Enrollment: 43 (2023–2024)
- Colors: Navy and White
- Mascot: Peacock
- Website: RdM Website

Rancho Del Mar High School is one of three public high schools on the Palos Verdes Peninsula (the others being Palos Verdes Peninsula High School and Palos Verdes High School). Located on Crest Road in Rolling Hills, the school is part of the Palos Verdes Peninsula Unified School District.

Rancho Del Mar was opened in 1984 on the former site of La Cresta Elementary School.

With a relatively small enrollment, Rancho Del Mar High School focuses on students who experience difficulty with the regular high school environment or curriculum. It is a common secondary destination for those struggling with behavioral or academic issues at either Palos Verdes or Palos Verdes Peninsula High School. Enrollment is only granted through administrative recommendation.
