= Erik Lorig =

American football player (born 1986)

No. 44, 41
- Position: Fullback

Personal information
- Born: November 17, 1986 (age 39); Rolling Hills, California, U.S.
- Listed height: 6 ft 4 in (1.93 m)
- Listed weight: 265 lb (120 kg)

Career information
- High school: Palos Verdes Peninsula (Rolling Hills Estates, California)
- College: Stanford (2005–2009)
- NFL draft: 2010: 7th round, 253rd overall pick

Career history
- Tampa Bay Buccaneers (2010–2013); New Orleans Saints (2014)

Career NFL statistics
- Receptions: 39
- Receiving yards: 220
- Receiving touchdowns: 2
- Stats at Pro Football Reference

Erik Lorig (born November 17, 1986) is an American former professional football player who was a fullback for the Tampa Bay Buccaneers and New Orleans Saints of the National Football League (NFL).

He played defensive end and occasionally tight end in college football for the Stanford Cardinal. He was selected by the Buccaneers in the seventh round of the 2010 NFL draft, converted to fullback in his rookie season, and played for the team for four years. His rookie contract was for four years with incentive escalators. In March 2014, the Saints signed Lorig in free agency to a four-year contract.

== Early life ==
Lorig was born in Rolling Hills, California. He is of German and Scandinavian descent and is Jewish.

He played high school football as a tight end and linebacker at Palos Verdes Peninsula High School in California. He was named the All-Bay Conference Defensive Player of the Year both his junior and senior years. He received Cal-Hi Sports, Parade Magazine, PrepStar and SuperPrep All-America honors as a senior.

== College career ==
He played college football for the Stanford Cardinal at defensive end. At 6-foot-4, 280 pounds, he ran the 40-yard (37 m) dash in 4.76 seconds, and was known for having a quick burst off the line. Lorig did not work out while at the combine due to injury. In his first two years at Stanford, Lorig played tight end and wore number 80. In his freshman campaign, Lorig played in all 12 games where he contributed on special teams and served as the offense's blocking TE, often lining up in the backfield as an H-back/fullback. He recorded 10 catches for 100 yards.

He was then asked by the new coaching staff to switch to defensive end for his junior year, and proceeded to record 39 tackles, including 6 tackles for loss and 3 sacks in 2008, and had 37 tackles, 7.5 tackles for loss and 2 sacks in 2007. His NFL prospect status took a severe hit in 2009, when he sat out most of the season because of a torn pectoral muscle.

In his five years at Stanford he started 25 of 29 games, and had 95 tackles, 16.5 tackles for a loss, and 4.5 sacks, earning Honorable Mention All-Pac 10 as a junior, and All-Pac All-Academic team twice (2008, 2009).

As an undergraduate at Stanford, Lorig majored in Public Policy, a sub-department within the School of Economics, with an emphasis in Technology Policy, and minored in Film and Media Studies. As part of the team's approach to academics as well as sports, the players' GPAs were posted in the locker room, along with their weight lifting results. He obtained a master's degree in Digital Media Technologies at Stanford in 2011, taking classes during his off-seasons.

== Professional career ==
=== Tampa Bay Buccaneers ===
Lorig was selected by the Tampa Bay Buccaneers in the seventh round (253rd overall) of the 2010 NFL draft. He was signed to a four-year contract for $1.8 million on June 18, 2010.

Lorig switched from defensive end to fullback/tight end on October 3, 2010. He made his NFL debut at Cincinnati a week later, and had his first NFL start against Carolina on November 14, 2010, starting at fullback. In 2010, he played in 12 games, starting 1, and in 2011, he played in 16 games, starting 7.

On September 9, 2012, he tied for first on the team with a career-high four receptions. He had his first career touchdown reception at Minnesota on October 25, 2012. In 2012, he played in all 16 games, starting 7. In 2013, he played in 15 games, starting 9. In his four seasons with the Buccaneers, he played in 62 regular season games (starting 24 at fullback and tight end), while catching 30 passes for 193 yards and one touchdown. Lorig helped lead running back Doug Martin to several Buccaneer franchise records including: Martin's 1,926 yards from scrimmage in a single season ranks him second in Buccaneers' history behind James Wilder Sr. (2,229 yards from scrimmage) Martin went on to two Pro Bowl selections in 2012 and 2013, with Lorig as his lead blocker.

Lorig became a free agent in 2014. In February 2014, the Buccaneers were reported to be interested in re-signing him.

=== New Orleans Saints ===
During NFL free agency, Lorig signed a four-year contract reportedly worth $5 million with a $1 million signing bonus with the New Orleans Saints on March 18, 2014. In the 2014 season, Lorig lead running back Mark Ingram II to a franchise rushing record for consecutive 100 yard games in a season, and helped elect Ingram to a Pro Bowl selection.

After suffering a broken ankle in his first training camp with the team, Lorig returned to play on October 18 against the Green Bay Packers, leading running back Mark Ingram II run for over 100 yards and recording two receptions from Drew Brees. In the final seconds of the game, Lorig took two carries of the football while the game clock wound down.

On November 28 against the Pittsburgh Steelers, Lorig scored his first touchdown with the Saints in the 2nd quarter, giving the Saints the lead over the Steelers.

He was released by the Saints later in the 2015 season. After departing the Saints, Lorig spent the 2016 season with several other teams. He has played 66 games in the NFL.

== Accolades ==
In 2015 he was inducted into the Southern California Jewish Sports Hall of Fame.

== Post-football ==
Lorig is an MBA student at the Wharton School of the University of Pennsylvania, Class of 2020, focusing on finance and real estate.

== See also ==
- List of select Jewish football players
