= Eli Morgan =

American baseball player (born 1996)

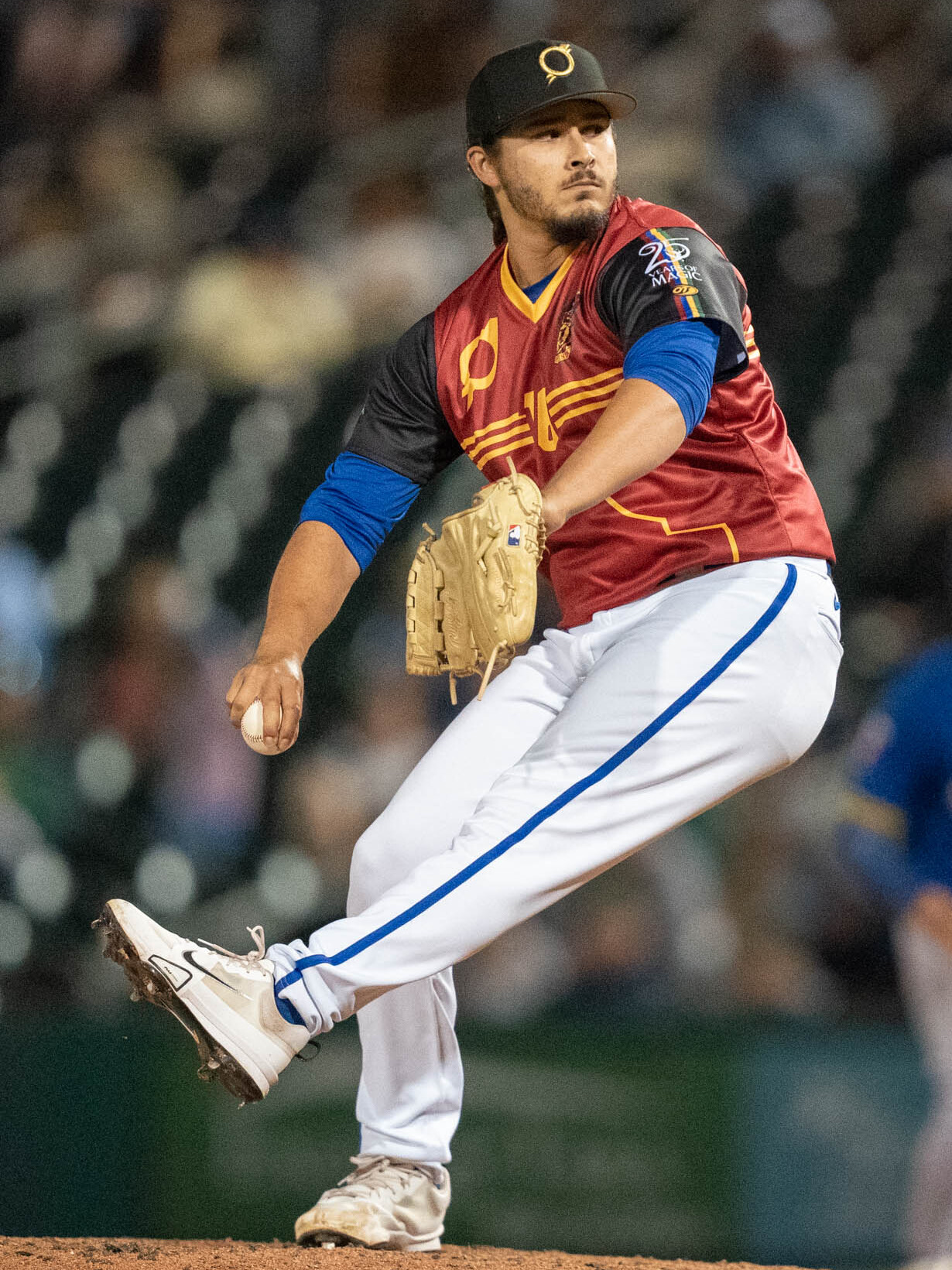
- Morgan with the Omaha Storm Chasers in 2026

Free agent
- Pitcher
- Born: May 13, 1996 (age 30); Rancho Palos Verdes, California, U.S.
- Bats: Right Throws: Right

MLB debut
- May 28, 2021, for the Cleveland Indians

MLB statistics (through 2026 season)
- Win–loss record: 18–14
- Earned run average: 4.25
- Strikeouts: 282
- Stats at Baseball Reference

Teams
- Cleveland Indians / Guardians (2021–2024); Chicago Cubs (2025); Kansas City Royals (2026)

Elijah Allan Morgan (born May 13, 1996) is an American professional baseball pitcher who is a free agent. He has previously played in Major League Baseball (MLB) for the Cleveland Guardians, Chicago Cubs, and Kansas City Royals. Morgan played college baseball for the Gonzaga Bulldogs. He was selected by Cleveland in the eighth round of the 2017 MLB draft, and made his MLB debut in 2021.

== Early and personal life ==
Morgan was born in Rancho Palos Verdes, California, to Diana and Dave Morgan, a former deputy sports editor for the Los Angeles Times. He has a sister, named Briana. He resides in Redondo Beach, California. Morgan is of Jewish parentage, his father being Jewish, but does not identify as Jewish himself.

== High school ==
Morgan attended Peninsula High School in Rolling Hills Estates, California. In 2014, as a senior, he had a 10–2 win–loss record with a 1.23 earned run average (ERA). He was named Bay League Co-Pitcher of the Year and All-California Interscholastic Federation First Team. He was not drafted out of high school in the 2014 Major League Baseball draft. In the summer of 2014, he was 8–0 and an All Star for the Yakima Valley Pippins in the collegiate West Coast League.

== College career ==
Morgan enrolled at Gonzaga University, where he played college baseball for the Gonzaga Bulldogs after being offered a spot on the team as a walk-on. In 2015, as a freshman, Morgan pitched to a 1–0 record with a 2.36 ERA (10th in the West Coast Conference; WCC) in 14 appearances (three starts), had a 1.118 WHIP (9th), gave up 1.6 walks/9 innings pitched (4th), and had 4.5 strikeouts/walk (4th). Pitching for the Mat-Su Miners in the collegiate Alaska Baseball League in the summer of 2015, he was 5–0 with an 0.73 ERA, and was named to the All-League Team. In 2020, he was named to the Miners' All-Decade Team.

As a sophomore in 2016, Morgan transitioned into a full-time starter, going 10–3 (his 10 wins were 2nd in the Conference) with a 3.73 ERA and 107 strikeouts (4th), and leading the Conference with 3 shutouts in 111 innings over 16 starts, earning him a spot on the All-WCC First Team. After the season, he played in the collegiate Cape Cod League for the Orleans Firebirds.

In 2017, his junior season, Morgan compiled a 10–2 record (his 10 wins were again 2nd in the Conference) with a 2.86 ERA in 14 starts, during which he had 2 shutouts (tied for the Conference lead), struck out a Conference-leading 138 batters (2nd-most in school history, and 3rd in the nation) in 100 2/3 innings (12.3 strikeouts/9 innings), had a 1.103 WHIP (10th), had 4.45 strikeouts/walk (8th), and was once again named to the All-WCC First Team. He was one of four pitchers in the country with multiple 15-strikeout games. He was also named Perfect Game/Rawlings First Team All-American, Collegiate Baseball Second Team All-American, three-time National Player of the Week, and five-time Rawlings WCC Pitcher of the Week.

== Professional career ==
=== Cleveland Indians / Guardians ===
==== 2017–19 ====
The Cleveland Indians selected Morgan in the eighth round of the 2017 Major League Baseball draft. He signed with the Indians for a $135,000 signing bonus. He made his professional debut that season with the Mahoning Valley Scrappers of the Low–A New York–Penn League, pitching to a 3–2 record with a 1.03 ERA (3rd-lowest in the league) in 35 innings in which he struck out 58 batters (14.9 strikeouts per 9 innings) and had a 0.94 WHIP. He was recognized by Baseball America for having the best changeup in Cleveland's farm system.

Morgan began 2018 with the Lake County Captains of the Single–A Midwest League, and was promoted to the Lynchburg Hillcats of the High–A Carolina League in May. In 27 starts between the two clubs, Morgan went 9–7 with a 3.27 ERA, striking out 156 batters in 143 1/3 innings (9.8 strikeouts per 9 innings). For the second straight season, he was recognized by Baseball America for having the best changeup in Cleveland's farm system, and he was also named an MiLB.com Organization All Star and the Indians' 2018 Minor League Pitcher of the Year.

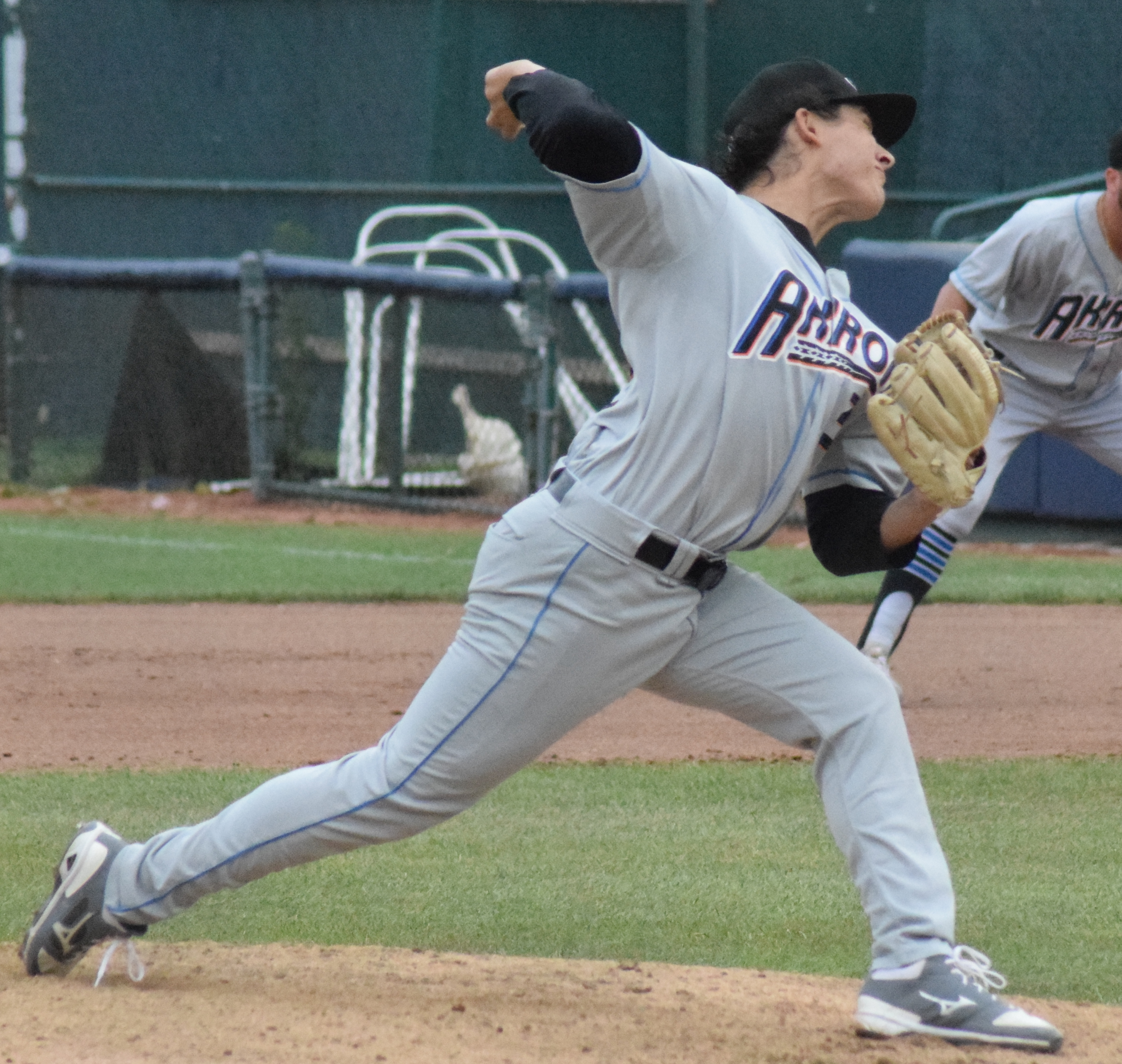
Morgan with the Akron RubberDucks in 2019

In 2019, Morgan began the year with Lynchburg before being promoted to the Akron RubberDucks of the Double–A Eastern League in May, with whom Morgan was named a mid-season All-Star. In July, he made one spot start with the Columbus Clippers of the Triple–A International League before being reassigned to Akron, with whom he finished the year. Over 26 games (25 starts) between the three clubs, Morgan went 9–6 with a 3.39 ERA, striking out 146 over 140 2/3 innings (9.3 strikeouts per 9 innings). He led the Indians' minor leaguers in innings, was second in strikeouts, and was named an MiLB.com and MLB.com Organization All Star.

==== 2020–21 ====
Morgan did not play in a game in 2020 due to the cancellation of the minor league season because of the COVID-19 pandemic, and instead spent the season at the team's Lake County Alternate Training Site. He was once again recognized by Baseball America as having the best changeup and control among Indians minor league pitchers. Through 2020, he averaged 10.2 strikeouts and 2.3 walks per 9 innings in the minor leagues. The Indians added him to their 40-man roster on November 20, 2020.

To begin the 2021 season, Morgan returned to Columbus, now members of the newly-formed Triple-A East, with whom he pitched in five games. Baseball America ranked him as having the best command in Cleveland's system.

==== Major leagues ====
The Indians promoted Morgan to the major leagues on May 28, 2021, and he made his major league debut that same day, starting against the Toronto Blue Jays. With winds gusting up to 45 mph in a game called early due to weather, over 2 2/3 innings he gave up six earned runs, eight hits (including three doubles), and two walks, and struck out one, and was tagged with the loss as the Indians fell 11–2. Indians manager Terry Francona said: "I don't know how you evaluate that outing. I thought he was going to get blown off the mound.... That was some of the worst conditions I think I've ever seen."

Morgan had a lower ERA each successive month of the season, culminating with his five starts in the last month of the season in which he was 3–1 with a 3.90 ERA and held batters to a .240 batting average. For the 2021 Indians, Morgan started 18 games in which he went 5–7 with a 5.34 ERA and 81 strikeouts over 89 1/3 innings.

Pitching for Cleveland in 2022, Morgan was 5-3 with 10 holds and a 3.38 ERA, as in 50 games (one start) he pitched 66 2/3 innings. He gave up 46 hits (holding hitters to a .192 batting average) and 13 walks for an 0.885 WHIP, struck out 72 batters, and had a strikeout-to-walk ratio of 6.09 (fourth in the league). Among American League relievers who pitched 60 or more innings, he had the highest first-strike percentage (70.9%), gave up the second-fewest walks per 9 innings (1.55), had the third-highest strikeout-to-walk ratio, and had the fourth-lowest WHIP.

In the post-season, Morgan pitched in the 2022 American League Wild Card Series, where in 1 1/3 innings he struck out two batters and did not allow any baserunners.

In 2023, Morgan was 5-2 with one save, seven holds, and a 4.01 ERA, as in a career-high 61 games he pitched 67 1/3 innings. He struck out 75 batters, and struck out 10.0 batters per 9 innings. He had a salary of $727,000. In 2024, he was 3–0 with a 1.93 ERA and 34 strikeouts, in 32 games covering 42 innings, with a WHIP of 0.976.

=== Chicago Cubs ===
On November 20, 2024, the Guardians traded Morgan to the Chicago Cubs in exchange for minor league prospect Alfonsin Rosario. He struggled to an 0-1 record and 12.27 ERA with four strikeouts over his first seven games, and was placed on the injured list with a right elbow impingement on April 15, 2025. Morgan was transferred to the 60-day injured list on May 10, with what was specified as an inflamed ulnar nerve in his right elbow. He was activated on September 21, and was subsequently optioned to the Triple-A Iowa Cubs. On November 21, Morgan was non-tendered by Chicago and became a free agent.

=== Kansas City Royals ===
On January 29, 2026, Morgan signed a minor league contract with the Kansas City Royals. On March 25, the Royals selected Morgan's contract and subsequently optioned him to the Triple-A Omaha Storm Chasers. He made 16 appearances for Kansas City, logging an 0–1 record and 5.12 ERA with 16 strikeouts and one save across 19 1/3 innings pitched. Morgan was designated for assignment following the signing of Tony Gonsolin on August 13. He elected free agency after clearing waivers on August 16.

=== New York Yankees ===
On August 21, 2026, Morgan signed a minor league contract with the New York Yankees. In nine games with Triple-A Scranton/Wilkes-Barre Railriders, he threw 11 innings of relief, going 0-1 with a 4.09 ERA and 11 strikeouts. Morgan elected free agency on November 2.

== Pitching style ==
Morgan has a low-90s four-seam fastball that touches 94 miles per hour (151 km/h) and averages 3.3 inches (84 mm) of horizontal movement (which is 48% better than average), an above-average "Bugs Bunny" four-seam changeup, and a slider (one soft version of it in the 82 miles per hour (132 km/h) range, and another version of it in the 87–88 miles per hour (140–142 km/h) range). His changeup had an average velocity of 75.1 miles per hour (120.9 km/h), the slowest among major league pitchers who worked at least 40 innings in 2021. In 2022 he threw his fastball half the time and batters hit .205 against it, his changeup a quarter of the time (.184), and his slider 16% of the time (.182). He is known for his command.
