= Nina Easton =

American author and journalist (born 1958)

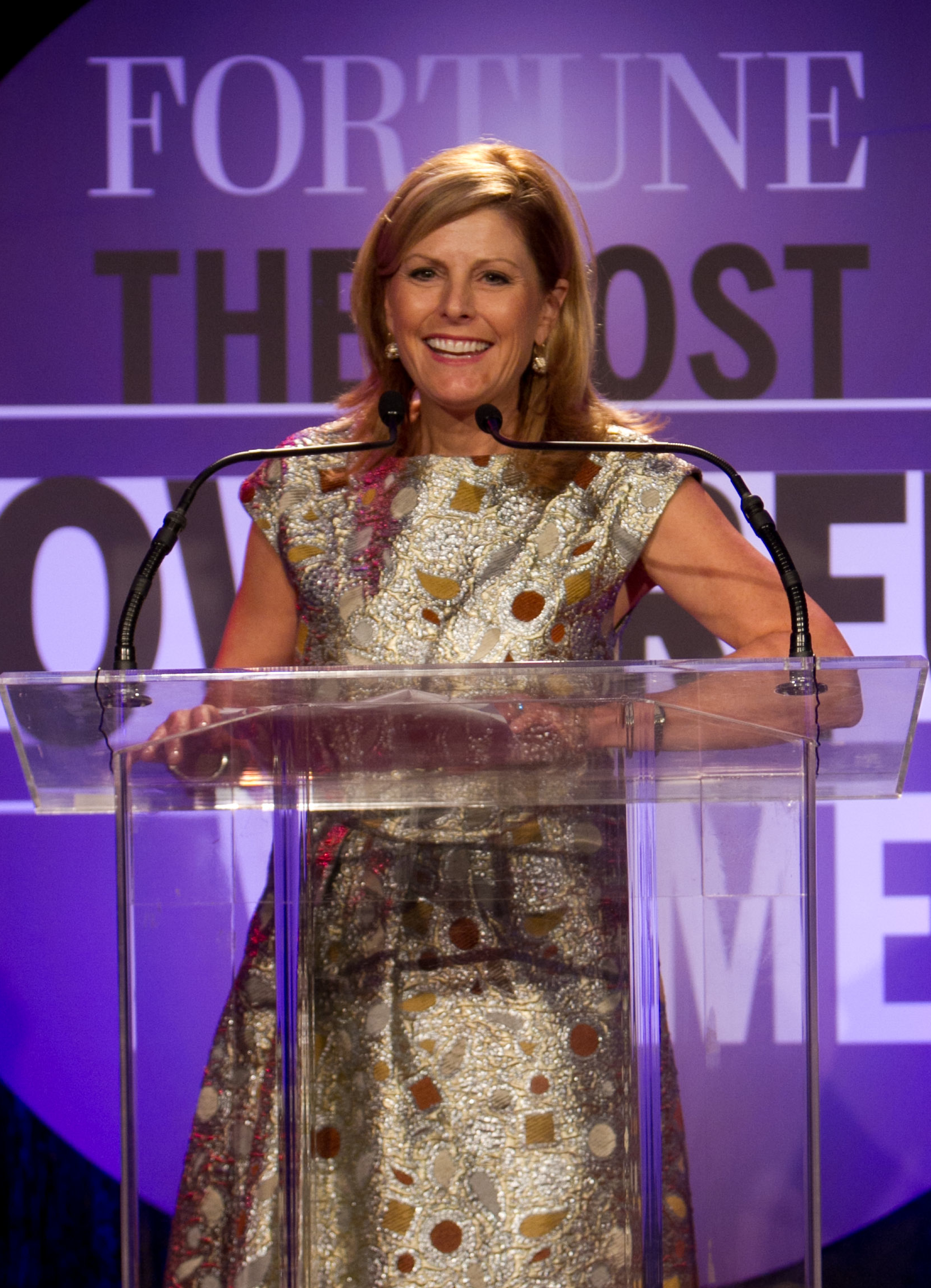
- Easton at the 2012 Fortune "Most Powerful Women" summit
- Born: October 27, 1958 (age 68)
- Occupations: Journalist and author
- Employer: Fortune Magazine
- Spouse(s): Ronald Brownstein (divorced) Russell Schriefer (m. 2004)
- Children: 3

Nina Jane Easton (born October 27, 1958) is an American author, journalist, TV commentator, entrepreneur, and film producer. In 2016, she co-founded SellersEaston Media, a private-client storytelling service that chronicles the legacies and impact of leaders in business, public service, and philanthropy. A former senior editor and award-winning columnist for Fortune magazine, she chaired Fortune Most Powerful Women International, with live events in Asia, Europe, Canada, and the U.S., and co-chaired Fortune Global Forum, which brought together top business and government leaders from around the world.

At Center for Strategic and International Studies (CSIS), she founded and hosts a live event series on global affairs called "Smart Women Smart Power." She is a frequent political analyst on television. In 2012, she was a fellow at Harvard Kennedy School at Harvard University.

== Early life and education ==
Nina Easton was born in Sudbury, Massachusetts, the daughter of James Easton, an aerospace engineer, and Janet Easton, a homemaker. She grew up in Rancho Palos Verdes, California, and attended Miraleste High School.

Her involvement in journalism began at Colorado State University in Fort Collins, Colorado, where she worked as a copy editor and reporter on the college newspaper and authored a front page feature story for The Denver Post at age 19. After transferring to the University of California, Berkeley, she joined the staff of The Daily Californian, where she rose from reporter to international page editor and then to managing editor. In a 2000 C-SPAN interview, Easton said, "I just started writing for the school paper, and it never left my blood."

== Career ==
=== Journalism ===
Easton started her career in journalism in 1981 as a writer for Ralph Nader, co-authoring a book on the Reagan administration. In 1984 she became a staff reporter for the Washington D.C.–based Legal Times. She then wrote for The American Banker and Businessweek before joining the Los Angeles Times as a staff writer, a position she held from 1988 to 1998. Easton's writing for the Los Angeles Times earned her a National Headliner Award in 1994 for best magazine writing and a Sunday Magazine Editors Award for investigative reporting.

In 2003, Easton joined The Boston Globe as the deputy bureau chief at the paper's Washington, D.C. bureau. From 2006 until 2016, she was a senior editor covering politics and economics for Fortune Magazine. In 2014, her Fortune column was honored with a National Headliner Award for magazine commentary. Easton also serves as chair of Fortune Magazine's Most Powerful Women International, which hosts events in the United States as well as internationally. She is co-chair of the Fortune Global Forum, which in 2016 brought CEOs to the Vatican to meet Pope Francis and discuss a private-sector compact on creating a more inclusive global economy.

For more than a decade, from 2005 through 2016, Easton was a regular panelist on Fox News Sunday and Special Report with Bret Baier, among other Fox news shows. She has also contributed commentary to NBC's Meet the Press, CBS's Face the Nation, ABC's This Week, and PBS programs including The Charlie Rose Show. During the 2004 elections she was an analyst on CNN and during the 2008 campaign she provided primetime election commentary for Fox News.

In 1991, Easton was named a "rising star" by the British-American Project, a collaborative project between the School of Advanced International Studies at Johns Hopkins University and the Royal Institute of International Affairs. In 1995, she co-chaired the organization's annual conference in England.

In 2002, she authored Gang of Five: Leaders at the Center of the Conservative Ascendancy, a book that chronicles the rise of post-Reagan conservatism, which now ranks on the Vox list of "books to read to understand the world."

In spring 2012, Easton was named a Goldsmith Fellow at Harvard University's Joan Shorenstein Center on the Press, Politics and Public Policy. Easton's announced research project focused on the increasing income inequality in the United States and its impact on Americans' views of the wealthy. Also in 2012, she was named a fellow at the Institute of Politics at Harvard University, where her responsibilities included leading a study group for the Harvard community focusing on role the economy plays in the election cycle.

== Publications ==
In 1982, Easton co-authored Reagan's Ruling Class: Portraits of the President's Top 100 Officials with Ronald Brownstein. The book's preface was written by Ralph Nader, The book profiled individuals involved in Ronald Reagan's presidency and included interviews with most of the administration's top officials.

In 2002, she authored Gang of Five: Leaders at the Center of the Conservative Ascendancy, which examined the rise of modern conservatism and what Easton called the "hidden history" of the baby-boom generation. Gang of Five profiled five leaders of the U.S. conservative movement at the time: William Kristol, Grover Norquist, David M. McIntosh, Clint Bolick, and Ralph Reed.

In 2004, while working for The Boston Globe, Easton co-authored John F. Kerry: A Complete Biography by The Boston Globe Reporters Who Know Him Best, with fellow Globe reporters Michael Kranish and Brian Mooney. The book was published John Kerry's presidential campaign.

== Personal life ==
In 1983, Easton married Ronald Brownstein, and they had two children before divorcing. In November 2004, she married Russell Schriefer, a Republican political strategist who was senior advisor to Mitt Romney's unsuccessful 2012 presidential campaign. In May 2007, Washington Monthly named Easton and Schriefer to its list of Washington, D.C. "power couples". They live with their daughter in Chevy Chase, Maryland.

== Bibliography ==
- Reagan's Ruling Class: Portraits of the President's Top 100 Officials, Pantheon, 1982, co-authored with Ronald Brownstein
- Gang of Five: Leaders at the Center of the Conservative Ascendancy, Simon & Schuster, 2002
- John F. Kerry: The Complete Biography by The Boston Globe Reporters Who Know Him Best, PublicAffairs, 2004, co-authored with Michael Kranish and Brian Mooney
