= Palos Verdes Peninsula Unified School District =

School district in California, United States

Location
- 375 Via Almar, Palos Verdes Estates, CA 90274

District information
- Motto: One Team, One Hill, One PVPUSD!
- Superintendent: Dr. Devin Serrano

Students and staff
- Students: ~11,200

Other information
- President: Linda Kurt
- Website: www.pvpusd.net

Palos Verdes Peninsula Unified School District (PVPUSD) is a school district headquartered in Palos Verdes Estates, California with facilities in all four cities of the Palos Verdes Peninsula.

== History ==
The Palos Verdes School District (PVSD) formed on January 26, 1925 as an elementary school district officially when unincorporated Palos Verdes withdrew from the Los Angeles City Elementary School District. The District began by serving 26 students from kindergarten through 8th grade in its first facility set up in two rooms above a drug store in Malaga Cove Plaza. High school students were sent out of the District to attend Los Angeles City schools in Redondo Beach. The first official school on the Peninsula, Malaga Cove School, opened in 1926 followed by Miraleste School in 1929. The school district continued to grow and, between 1955 and 1965, enrollment went from 2,285 to 13,204 students.

Attempts to form a unified school district on the Peninsula, which would provide an educational program for all K-12 students to attend school on the Peninsula failed to pass in 1953, 1954, and 1957. Finally, in October 1960, voters elected to form a unified school district. On July 1, 1961, PVSD officially unified and became the Palos Verdes Peninsula Unified School District (PVPUSD). In September 1961 Palos Verdes High School, the first public high school on the Peninsula, opened with an enrollment of 2,043 students.

By 1973 enrollment in the District reached a high of 17,836 students resulting in serious overcrowding. Various measures were used to address the issue including redrawing attendance boundaries. The District also studied the viability of a year-round schedule with double sessions, extended-day sessions, reduction of high school graduation requirements and the purchase of portable classrooms.

PVPUSD changed greatly in the 1970s largely due to changes in the way the District was funded. Prior to 1972, most District income came from local property taxes which were based on assessed property value. In 1974 however, student enrollment became the most important factor in determining District income. While the District had a high enrollment in 1973, the next year enrollment started to drop thus reducing the District's funding.

Due to budget shortfalls, the District cut student programs and started to lay off its teachers in 1975. Local efforts to increase revenue limits per student were defeated. Through 1979, the District made further reductions in its staffing, closed facilities and cut student programs including sports. From the beginning of the 1970s to 1987, the student enrollment numbers declined to the point where, in 1987, there were 40% of the beginning of 1970s numbers. In 1988, there were 9,800 students, with 3,900 of them in senior high school. In 1991, Miraleste High School and Palos Verdes High School were closed and all high school students on the Peninsula were funneled to the former Rolling Hills High School campus, re-named Peninsula High School.

As of October 2016, the PVPUSD serves the four cities on the Peninsula as well its unincorporated areas with enrollment of approximately 11,500 students. The District includes: two early childhood centers, ten elementary schools, three intermediate schools, two high schools and one continuation school.

In 1992 84.5% of relevant voters voted approved Proposition Z to move the Los Angeles Unified School District (LAUSD) portion of Rancho Palos Verdes to PVPUSD but Stephen E. O'Neil, a judge of the Los Angeles Superior Court, blocked the transfer.

In 2019 the district began admitting students whose grandparents live on the Peninsula. It did so after enrollment declined by 500 students over the previous five years, causing a 10% decline in revenue.

== Governance ==
The district is headed by a superintendent - Dr. Devin Serrano - and governed by a five-person, publicly elected school board.

The current board members are:

- Linda Kurt (term expires 2026) President
- Sara Deen (term expires in 2026) Vice-President
- Ami Ghandi (term expires in 2028) Member
- Eric Alegria (term expires in 2028) Member
- Linda Reid (term expires in 2026) Provisional Member

== Attendance areas ==
- The PVPUSD serves the cities of Palos Verdes Estates, Rancho Palos Verdes, Rolling Hills, and Rolling Hills Estates; most of Rancho Palos Verdes directly falls in PVPUSD.
- Parts of the city of Rancho Palos Verdes, known as Eastview, are served both by the PVPUSD, and the Los Angeles Unified School District (LAUSD). Two LAUSD-owned schools fall within the city of Rancho Palos Verdes: Dodson Middle School and Crestwood Elementary School.
- In 1999, an optional attendance boundary was agreed upon by the two school districts in which residents in Eastview could opt to either send their children to PVPUSD schools or LAUSD schools. Middle school-aged students in the area may attend Miraleste Intermediate School and high school-aged students attend both Palos Verdes Peninsula High School in Rolling Hills Estates and Palos Verdes High School in Palos Verdes Estates.
- Students whose parent or guardian works on the Palos Verdes peninsula or is a member of the United States military, or whose grandparents live in the district, may attend PVPUSD schools.

== Demographics ==
As of the 2024-25 Census, the Palos Verdes Peninsula Unified School District comprises 10,393 students from grades K - 12. The demographic breakdown is: White (38.6%), Asian (31.5%), Hispanic (15.4%), Multiracial (12%), African American (2.1%) and Native American (0.2%). Approximately 11% of the students were on free and reduced lunch programs.

In the 2020 Census, 1,365 students were born outside of the United States. 346 were from Japan, 214 were from Taiwan, 150 were from Korea, and others originated from several countries including Iran, Mexico, other countries in Latin America, and the Philippines.

District Demographics Enrollment from 2020 Census
Student group	Total	Percentage
English Learners	690	6.3%
Foster Youth	5	0%
Homeless	9	0.1%
Socioeconomically Disadvantaged	914	8.3%
Students with Disabilities	960	8.7%

== Schools ==
There are three high schools, Palos Verdes Peninsula High School (formerly called Rolling Hills High School), Palos Verdes High School (the latter located just a half block from the Pacific Ocean) and Rancho Del Mar High School (located on Crest Road in Rolling Hills). In the 1970s–1980s the high schools were: Palos Verdes High School, Rolling Hills High School, and Miraleste High School.

Preschools

- Miraleste Early Learning Academy
- Valmonte Early Learning Academy

Elementary schools

- Cornerstone Elementary School
- Dapplegray Elementary School
- Lunada Bay Elementary School
- Mira Catalina Elementary School
- Montemalaga Elementary School
- Point Vicente Elementary School
- Rancho Vista Elementary School
- Silver Spur Elementary School
- Soleado Elementary School
- Vista Grande Elementary School

Intermediate schools

- Miraleste Intermediate School
- Palos Verdes Intermediate School
- Ridgecrest Intermediate School

High schools

- Palos Verdes High School – grades 9–12
- Palos Verdes Peninsula High School – grades 9–12
- Rancho Del Mar High School – continuation

=== Former schools ===
- Miraleste High School
- Rolling Hills High School
  - The school had a Parent Teacher Association; in 1969 the association began allowing students to participate, and so it became the "Parent Teacher Student Association", with 40 students joining the organization. In 1970 the PTSA began organizing participation on a family basis, with $2 per family as a fee to join.
- Dapplegray Intermediate School
  - The campus had 43 acres (17 ha) of land. Dapplegray Intermediate School closed effective 1987; students in the 6th grade were moved to Mira Catalina and Rancho Vista elementary schools, while older students were moved to Miraleste High School, which began having middle school grades. Post-closing, individuals had damaged the campus via vandalism. By 1991 the district had only one entity seeking to purchase the property: a real estate concern. In April 1992 a Japanese private elementary and middle school, Nishiyamato Academy of California, began using space at the former Dapplegray. In 1993 a theater organization was using the campus, and there were plans to convert it into a community center. In 1994, the district leased additional classrooms to Nishiyamato.
