= Miraleste High School =

Public high school in Ranchos Palos Verdes, California, U.S.

Miraleste High School was a public high school of the Palos Verdes Peninsula Unified School District (PVPUSD), located in Rancho Palos Verdes, California, in the Los Angeles metropolitan area.

== History ==
In fall 1968, the school was established. At its opening, the school had a Parent Teacher Association; in 1969 the association began allowing students to participate, and so it became the "Parent Teacher Student Association." In 1971 there were about 1,500 students at Miraleste High. That year, there were 1,368 people participating in the PTSA, including 870 parents and 498 students.

In 1977, several communities were rezoned to Miraleste from PVPUSD's other high schools, even ones in which those high schools were closer than Miraleste. This was despite community members arguing that Miraleste would have too many students.

Miraleste had only high school grades prior to 1986. In 1986, grades 7-8 were transferred from the closed Dapplegray Intermediate School to Miraleste High.

Miraleste High School had success at the highest level of high school athletic competition in Tennis at the National level and in California(CIF 4-A). Both MHS men´s & girls' tennis team were known for its success during the 80´s, achieving 6 CIF-Southern Section 4-A championships starting in 1981 with Coach and Algebra professor Clagg Offutt. According to the media the teams were described as a "dynasty".

And even farther, the MHS Men's tennis team won the 1981 National Championship in a record and unprecedented manner, out of the 64 points to be disputed, MHS conquered all of the 64 points. The specialized tennis media (Tennis Magazine, World Tennis Magazine) considers MHS 81 team the Best High School Tennis Team of All Time. National Championships 4 individual Singles tournaments. (All the teams No. 1 players played in one singles draw, in another draw played all the No. 2, and so on with the No. 3 and 4). 2 individual Doubles tournaments. (All the teams No. 1 doubles teams played in one doubles draw, in another draw played all the No. 2 doubles teams). In an unprecedented manner, and not repeated since, the MHS team won all of the tournaments. Singles Winners No. 1 John Letts No. 2 Jorge Lozano No. 3 Matt Frooman No. 4 Eric Amend

Doubles Winners No. 1 Rafael Belmar Osuna / Jorge Lozano No. 2 John Letts / Matt Frooman

The girls' tennis team was described as a "dynasty" by Adam Martin of the Los Angeles Times.

=== Closure ===
In 1986, residents received word that there was a plan to close Miraleste High, prompting an anti-closure protest which had an attendance of 800 people. A group called Committee to Save Miraleste High School was established. The pro-Miraleste High bloc advocated for closing the intermediate schools so all senior high schools would become combined intermediate and senior high schools. There was a group of parents who advocated to secede from PVPUSD as a result of proposals to close Miraleste.

In November 1987, the PVPUSD board of trustees decided to close Miraleste High; all board members chose to close Miraleste. The principal enacted a plan to ensure student morale would not decline too much.

The district had plans to remove Miraleste as it had the least number of students out of the three high schools. However, in 1987, a group of guardians and parents of students filed a lawsuit to keep the school open. By 1988 a court order required that the school stay open, and PVPUSD appealed that ruling. Miriam Vogel, a judge of the Los Angeles Superior Court, ordered that PVPUSD do an environmental impact study before it could make moves to permanently close Miraleste High.

In the meantime, the school had difficulty having the proper athletic leagues for its students, until an agreement was reached in August 1988. There was a feeling of instability in the athletic programs, as there was a lack of certainty on whether Miraleste would continue to operate.

In 1989, a deal was offered under which Miraleste High would be used for intermediate school classes, but remain in operation. Some area residents had a negative characterization of the PVPUSD's deal. That year, after the environmental report was released, officials from Rolling Hills Estates stated that the district needs to deal with issues regarding vehicle traffic and parking, or otherwise such officials would oppose the closure of Miraleste.

In October 1990, PVPUSD began public hearings on the fate of Miraleste High. In December 1990 the board again decided to close Miraleste High, along with Palos Verdes High School, and consolidate them into Rolling Hills High School. Miraleste was to be changed into Miraleste Intermediate School, as per the deal, with the same fate for the former Palos Verdes High.

== Notable alumni ==
- Nina Easton, journalist and author

National Scholastic National Tennis Champions Coach Clagg Offutt John Letts Jorge Lozano Matt Frooman Rafael Belmar Osuna Eric Amend Craig Johnson
