= Ron Brownstein =

American journalist (born 1958)

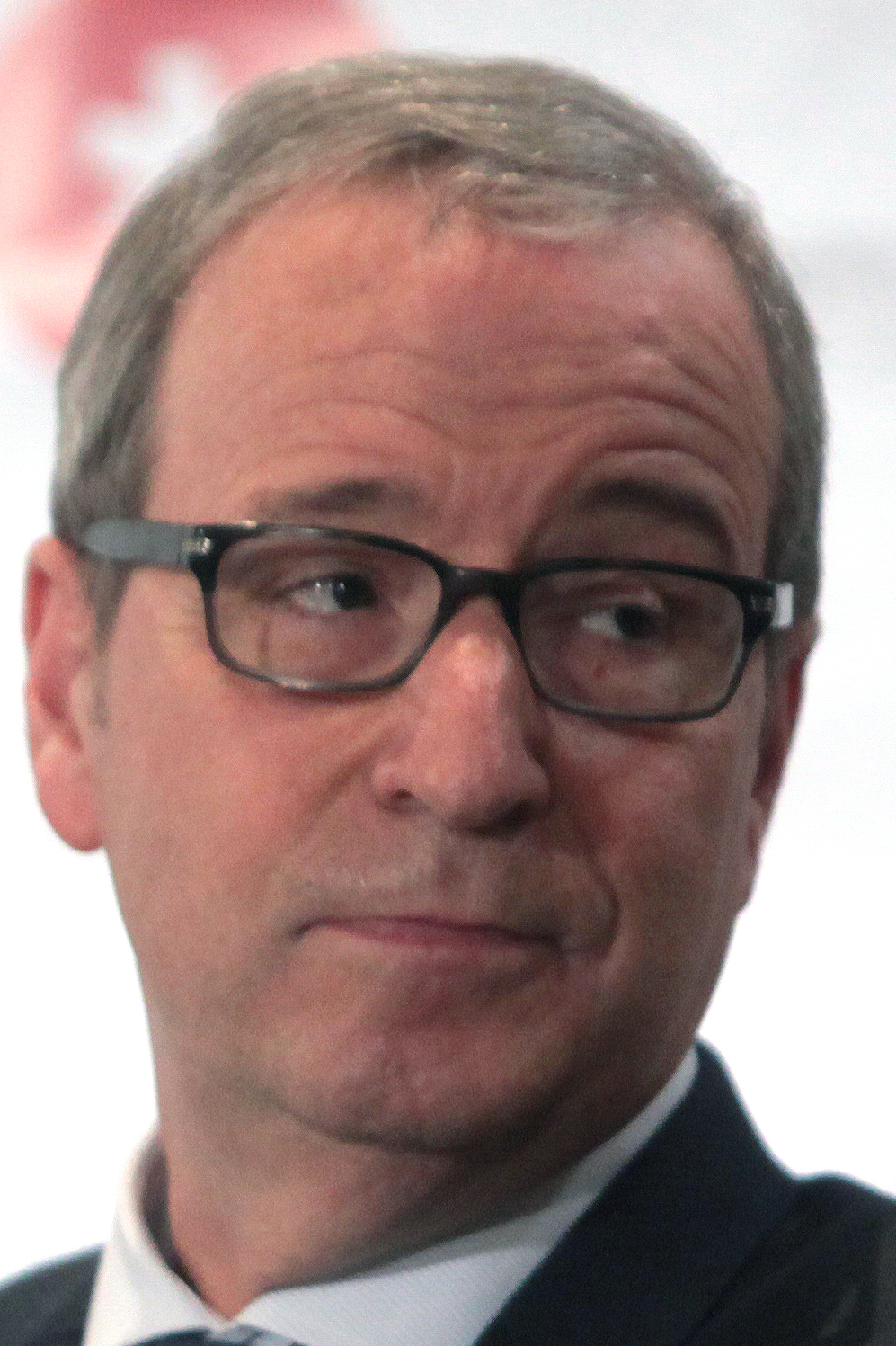
- Brownstein in 2016
- Born: April 6, 1958 (age 68); New York City, U.S.
- Education: State University of New York, Binghamton (BA)
- Occupations: Journalist; Political correspondent Analyst
- Spouse(s): Nina Easton (divorced) Eileen McMenamin (m. 2005)
- Children: 2

Ronald J. Brownstein (born April 6, 1958) is an American journalist, political correspondent and analyst.

== Early life and education ==
Brownstein was born to a Jewish family on April 6, 1958, in New York City, the son of Shirley and David Brownstein. His father was an electrician. In 1979, he graduated with a B.A. in English Literature from Binghamton University. He then worked as senior staff writer for Ralph Nader.

== Career ==
In 1983, he went to work for the National Journal as White House correspondent. In 1987, he became a contributing editor for the Los Angeles Times. In 1989, he left the National Journal to work full-time as national correspondent for the Los Angeles Times. In 1993, he was named their national political correspondent. In 1997, he accepted a position as chief political correspondent for U.S. News & World Report. In 1998, he went to work for CNN as a political analyst where he remained until 2004. He is currently senior political analyst for CNN and Editorial Director for Strategic Partnerships for Atlantic Media.

Brownstein made a cameo appearance in the 1993 film Dave.

== Personal life ==
Brownstein has been married twice. His first wife was Nina Easton and they had two children before divorcing. In 2005, he married Eileen Nicole McMenamin, the former communications director for Senator John McCain, in a nondenominational ceremony in Henderson, Nevada.
