= Palos Verdes Peninsula High School =

Public school in Rolling Hills Estates, California

Coordinates: 33.77801°N 118.37353°W

Location
- 27118 Silver Spur Road; Rolling Hills Estates, California 90274; United States

Information
- Type: Public
- Established: 1964
- CEEB code: 052683
- Principal: Dr. Kyle Garrity
- Faculty: 116 (2024-2025)
- Grades: 9–12
- Enrollment: 2,077 (2024-2025)
- Student to teacher ratio: 21.64
- Colors: Black and gold
- Mascot: Panthers
- Rivals: Palos Verdes High School
- Original name: Rolling Hills High School
- Renamed: 1991
- Website: pvphs.pvpusd.net

Palos Verdes Peninsula High School is a public high school in Rolling Hills Estates, Los Angeles County, California, United States, in the Los Angeles metropolitan area. The attendance area includes highly affluent cities of Rancho Palos Verdes, Rolling Hills Estates, Rolling Hills, as well as Palos Verdes Estates.

It is considered to be a top-ranked school in the Los Angeles, CA Metro Area (#11) and California (#34), according to U.S. News & World Report.

== History ==
The Palos Verdes Peninsula Unified School District (PVPUSD) consolidated its three high schools Palos Verdes High School, Miraleste High School and Rolling Hills High School, into one campus in 1991 when enrollment had declined. The former Rolling Hills High School campus, which originally opened in 1964, was selected as the site for the consolidated high school following the 1991 unification of the district’s three high schools. Among the available campuses — Palos Verdes High, Miraleste High, and Rolling Hills High — it offered the largest facilities, most modern infrastructure, and highest student capacity, making it the most practical choice to accommodate all students under one roof.

As a result, it became home to the newly formed Palos Verdes Peninsula High School, serving the entire peninsula’s secondary student population. When overcrowding became a problem after 1999, the Palos Verdes Peninsula Unified School District elected to re-open Palos Verdes High School.

== Demographics ==
In the 2023–24 year, there were 2,175 students enrolled in Palos Verdes Peninsula High School. Enrollment by race/ethnicity was 39.40% Asian, 32.55% White, 15.26% Hispanic, 2.21% Black, and 10.30% other. Enrollment by gender was 50.71% male and 49.01% female.

Enrollment By Grade
	9th	10th	11th	12th
Students	466	571	577	561

== Education ==
The high school is consistently recognized as one of the highest-performing public high schools in the state. In 2022, U.S. News & World Report ranked PVPHS 42nd in California and among the top 500 high schools nationally, with a 99% graduation rate and strong college readiness scores. More recently, in 2024, U.S. News ranked PVPHS 37th statewide. For the 2025–2026 school year, PVPHS was ranked #285 nationally, #34 in California, #11 in the Los Angeles Metro Area, and #259 among STEM High Schools, based on state test performance, graduation rates, and college readiness.

On the California Assessment of Student Performance and Progress (CAASPP) — the state’s Common Core-based testing system — PVPHS students consistently outperform statewide averages. In the most recent 2024 testing cycle, 85.53% of 11th-grade students met or exceeded standards in English Language Arts, while 58.58% met or exceeded standards in Mathematics.

== Athletics ==
In 2014, as a senior, future major leaguer Eli Morgan had a 10–2 win–loss record with a 1.23 earned run average. He was named Bay League Co-Pitcher of the Year and All-California Interscholastic Federation First Team.

== Extracurricular activities and programs ==
Palos Verdes Peninsula High School offers a large variety of extracurricular activities including, but not limited to, Model United Nations, Speech & Debate, Mock Trial, CyberPatriots, FRC Robotics, Science Research, and Academic Decathlon. Its Speech & Debate and Model United Nations programs are nationally ranked.
