= Palos Verdes High School =

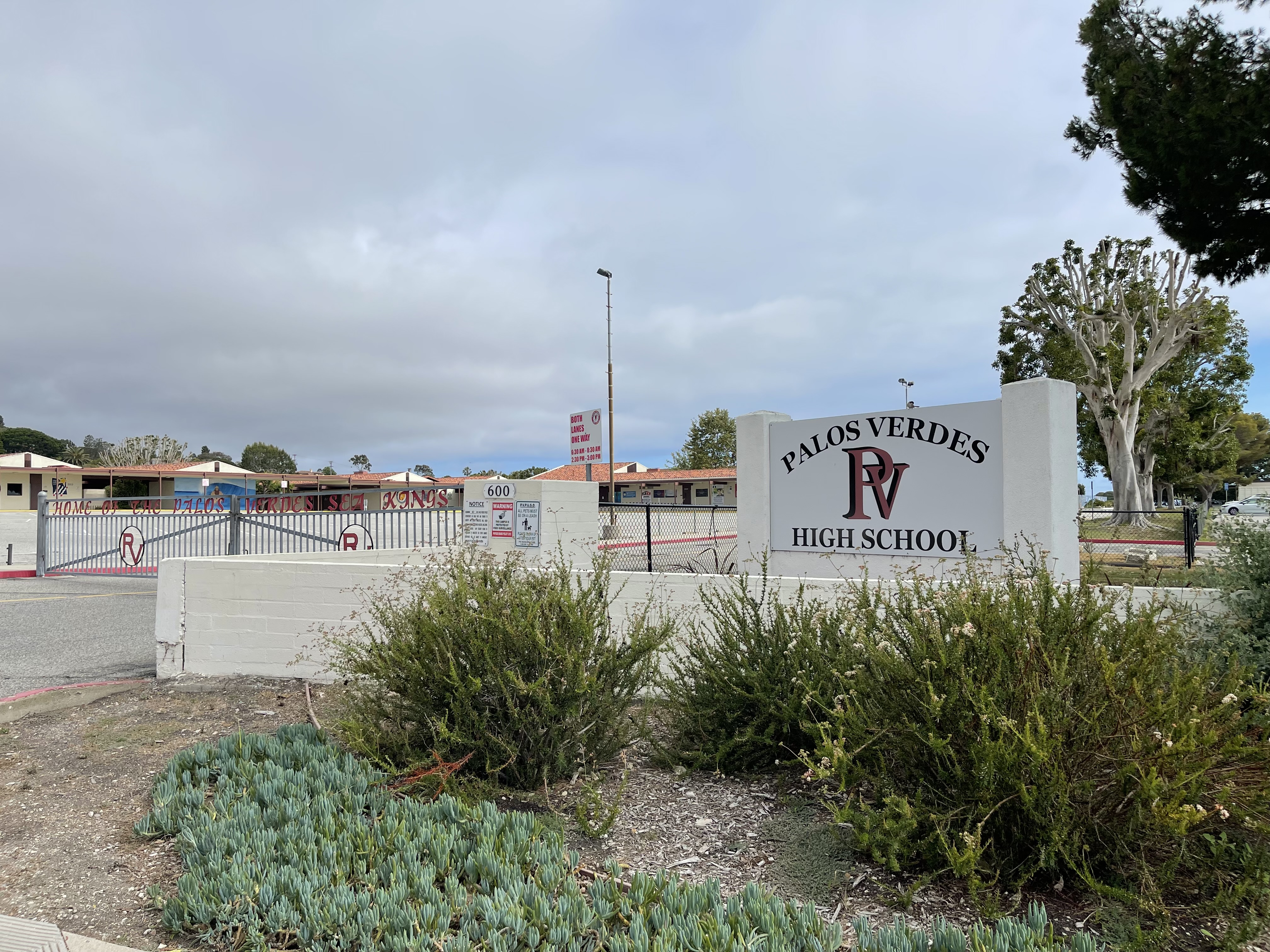

Location
- 600 Cloyden Road; Palos Verdes Estates, California 90274; United States; 33°46′50″N 118°25′11″W

Information
- Established: 1961
- CEEB code: 052358
- Enrollment: 1,419 (2023-2024)
- Student to teacher ratio: 21.65
- Colors: Red, black, and white
- Nickname: Sea Kings
- Architects: Richard Neutra, Robert Alexander, Carrington Lewis
- Website: pvhs.pvpusd.net

Palos Verdes High School (PVHS) is one of three public high schools on the Palos Verdes Peninsula in Los Angeles County, Southern California, United States (the others being Palos Verdes Peninsula High School (formerly Rolling Hills High School) and Rancho Del Mar High School). Located by the ocean in Palos Verdes Estates (in the Lunada Bay neighborhood), the school is part of the Palos Verdes Peninsula Unified School District.

== History ==
It originally opened in 1961.

The school had a Parent Teacher Association; in 1969 the association began allowing students to participate, and so it became the "Parent Teacher Student Association."

Originally opened in 1961, the school earned many awards for academic and athletic excellence before declining enrollments led the district to close PVHS in 1991, combining three existing high schools into Palos Verdes Peninsula High School (PVPHS). The campus remained in use as Palos Verdes Intermediate School, with the former intermediate schools having been closed as part of the reorganization. In 2002, climbing enrollments and overcrowding at Peninsula High School led the district to reopen Palos Verdes High School. By the first year, enrollment reached 470 students.

== Demographics ==
In the 2023–24 year, there were 1,419 students enrolled in Palos Verdes High School. Enrollment by race/ethnicity was 55.88% White, 16.77% Asian, 16.49% Hispanic, 1.76% Black, and 8.95% other. Enrollment by gender was 52.57% male and 47.50% female.

Enrollment by grade
	9th	10th	11th	12th
Students	368	344	340	367

== Athletics ==
The athletic teams (known as the Sea Kings) are represented by the colors red, black, and white. The nickname comes from the Greek god Poseidon, the school's official mascot. Palos Verdes competes in the Southern Section, Northern Division of the California Interscholastic Federation. In 2024, Palos Verdes won the CIF Division 2-AA state championship in football.

Fall sports:

- Cheer (JV, V)
- Boys' cross country
- Girls' cross country
- Football (F, JV, V)
- Girls' golf (JV, V)
- Song (JV, V)
- Girls' tennis (JV, V)
- Girls' volleyball (F/S, JV, V)
- Boys' water polo (F/S, JV, V)

Winter sports:

- Boys' basketball (F/S, JV, V)
- Girls' basketball (F/S, V)
- Boys' soccer (F/S, JV, V)
- Girls' soccer (F/S, JV, V)
- Boys' surf (V)
- Girls' surf (V)
- Girls' water polo (F/S, JV, V)

Spring sports:

- Baseball (F/S, JV, V)
- Boys' golf (JV, V)
- Boys' lacrosse (JV, V)
- Girls' lacrosse (JV, V)
- Softball (JV, V)
- Boys' swimming (F/S, V)
- Girls' swimming (F/S, V)
- Boys' tennis (JV, V)
- Boys' track
- Girls' track
- Boys' volleyball (F/S, JV, V)

== Notable alumni ==
- Mark Acres, pro basketball; Boston Celtics 1987–1989, Orlando Magic 1989–1992, Houston Rockets 1992, Washington Bullets 1993; Class of 1981
- George Felix Allen (R-VA), former senator, former governor, Class of 1970
- Heather Burge, WNBA player, Class of 1989
- Heidi Burge, WNBA player, Class of 1989
- Blair Bush, former center in the NFL, Class of 1974
- Ellie Darcey-Alden (born 1999), English actress, dancer and model
- Toulouse Engelhardt, guitarist, recording artist and composer, Class of 69
- Matt Grace, MLB pitcher for the Washington Nationals
- Craig Hogan, director of Fermilab Center for Particle Astrophysics, Class of 1972
- Carin Jennings, member of the USWNT, Class of 1983
- Bill Laimbeer, Detroit Pistons star and former WNBA coach and leader of the 1975 CIF championship basketball team, Class of 1975
- Daniel Levitin, neuroscientist, musician and author, Class of 1975
- Billy Martin, tennis pro, long-time UCLA tennis head coach, Class of 1974
- Rebecca Mehra (born 1994), middle-distance runner
- Sheila Rogers, television producer for David Letterman and James Corden's Carpool Karaoke, 7 Emmys, Class of 1978
- Dana Rohrabacher, former member of U.S. House of Representatives, Class of 1965
- Pete Sampras, tennis player, attended 1985–88
- Bryan James Scott, quarterback for the Generals of The Spring League
- Sable Starr, groupie, often described as the "queen of the groupie scene" in Los Angeles during the early 1970s
- Cameron Terrell (born 2000), former gang member
- Jan van Breda Kolff, former college and professional basketball player, SEC Player of the Year (1974), Class of 1970
- Tai Verdes (born 1995), singer
- Joe Walker, NFL linebacker for the Philadelphia Eagles
- John Welbourn, NFL offensive lineman, formerly with the Philadelphia Eagles and Kansas City Chiefs, attended 1990–1991
- Matt Wuerker, political cartoonist, winner of the 2012 Pulitzer Prize for Editorial Cartooning, Class of 1975

Alumni notable for criminal activities

- Christopher Boyce, convicted of espionage, subject of the movie The Falcon and the Snowman, from Robert Lindsey's book of the same name; attended Palos Verdes High School but transferred to nearby Rolling Hills High School, which he graduated from in 1971
- Andrew Daulton Lee, convicted of espionage, subject of the movie The Falcon and the Snowman, from Robert Lindsey's book of the same name, Class of 1970

== Notable faculty ==
- Jovan Vavic, former water polo coach
