= Palos Verdes Estates, California =

City in California, United States

- City
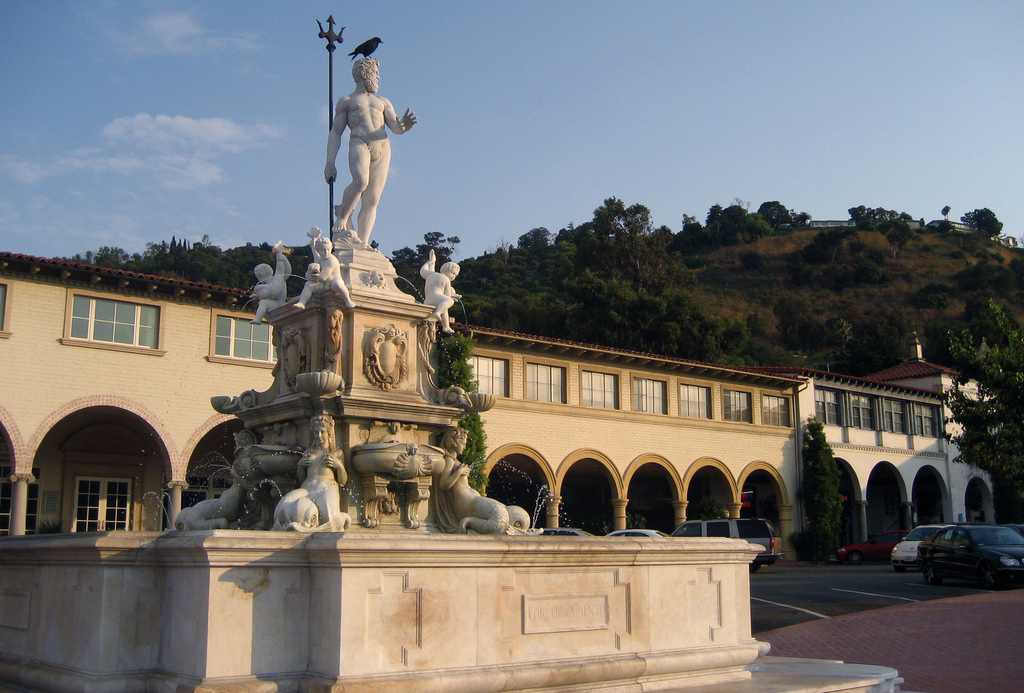
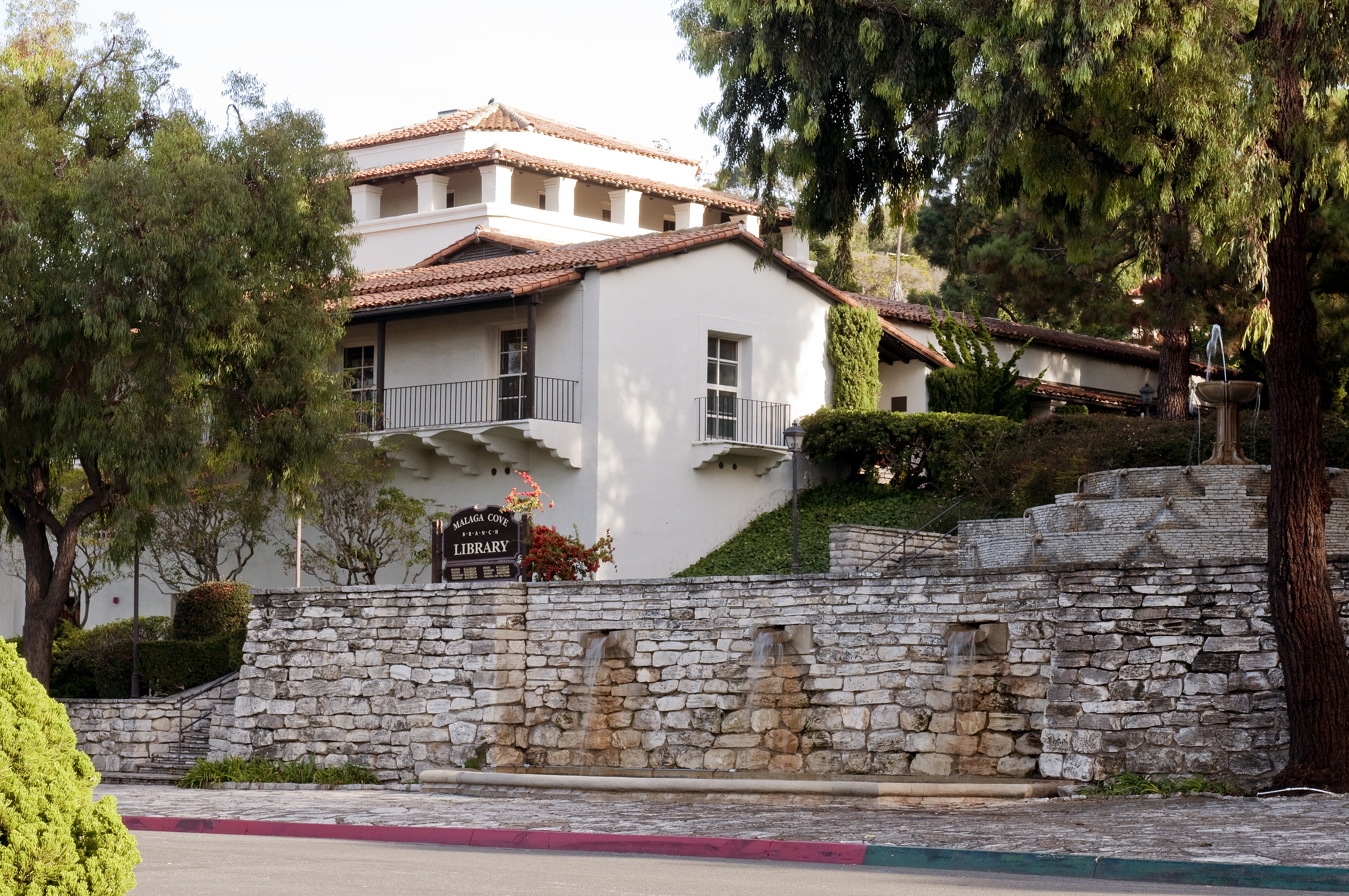
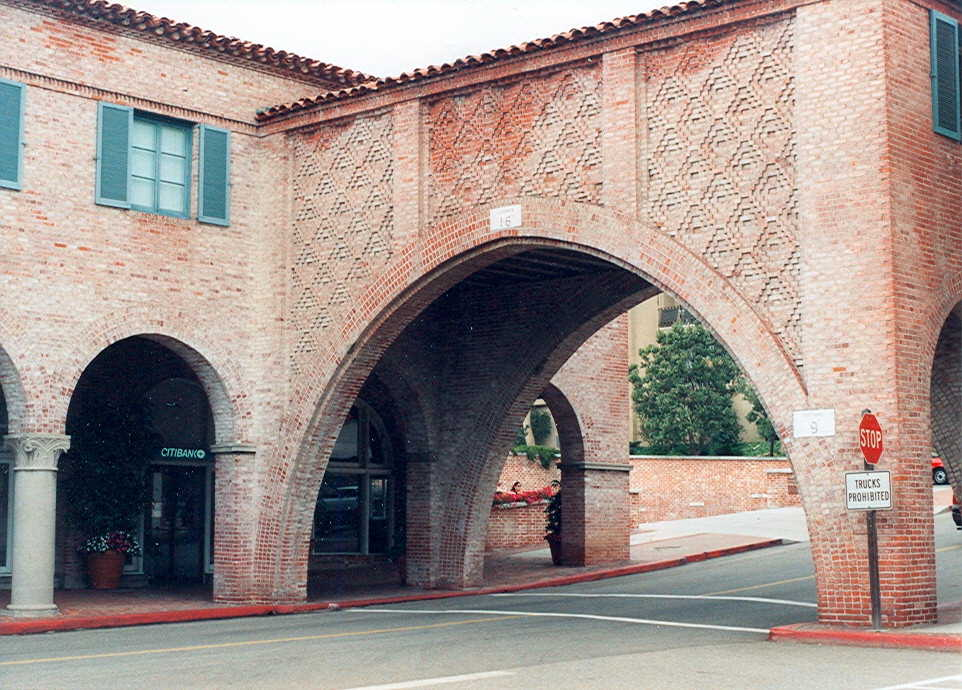
- Clockwise: Malaga Cove Plaza; Plaza archway; Malaga Cove Library

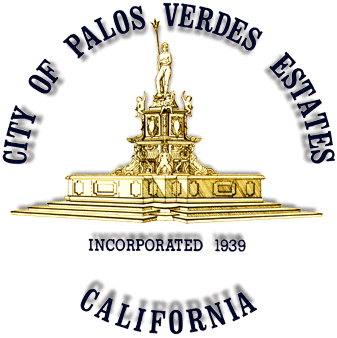
- Seal
- Interactive map of Palos Verdes Estates, California
- Location in the United States
- Coordinates: 33°47′13″N 118°23′48″W
- Country: United States
- State: California
- County: Los Angeles
- Incorporated: December 20, 1939

Government
  - Type: Council–manager
  - Mayor: Michael Kemps
  - Mayor Pro Tem: Derek Lazzaro
  - City Council: Victoria Lozzi; David McGowan; Craig Quinn

Area
  - Total: 4.77 sq mi (12.36 km^{2})
  - Land: 4.77 sq mi (12.36 km^{2})
  - Water: 0 sq mi (0.00 km^{2}) 0.01%
- Elevation: 210 ft (64 m)

Population (2020)
  - Total: 13,347
  - Density: 2,797/sq mi (1,080/km^{2})
- Time zone: UTC−08:00 (PST)
  - Summer (DST): UTC−07:00 (PDT)
- ZIP Code: 90274
- Area codes: 310/424
- FIPS code: 06-55380
- GNIS feature IDs: 1652770, 2411363
- Website: pvestates.org

Palos Verdes Estates is a coastal city in Los Angeles County, California, United States, situated on the Palos Verdes Peninsula and neighboring Rancho Palos Verdes and Rolling Hills Estates. The city was master-planned by the noted American landscape architect and planner Frederick Law Olmsted Jr. The city is located along the Southern California coastline of the Pacific Ocean.

The population was 13,347 at the 2020 census, a slight decrease from its 2010 population of 13,438. Palos Verdes Estates is one of the wealthiest cities in the United States, and was ranked as "California's richest suburb" in 2025. The 90274 ZIP code (covering the cities of Palos Verdes Estates and Rolling Hills) is considered some of the most exclusive and expensive neighborhoods in the United States. The city is also known for its high-performing school district, hiking trails, and oceanfront properties. The city is also notable for the century-old Palos Verdes Homeowners Association (PVHA), which controls architectural quality within the city via the PVHA Art Jury.

== History ==
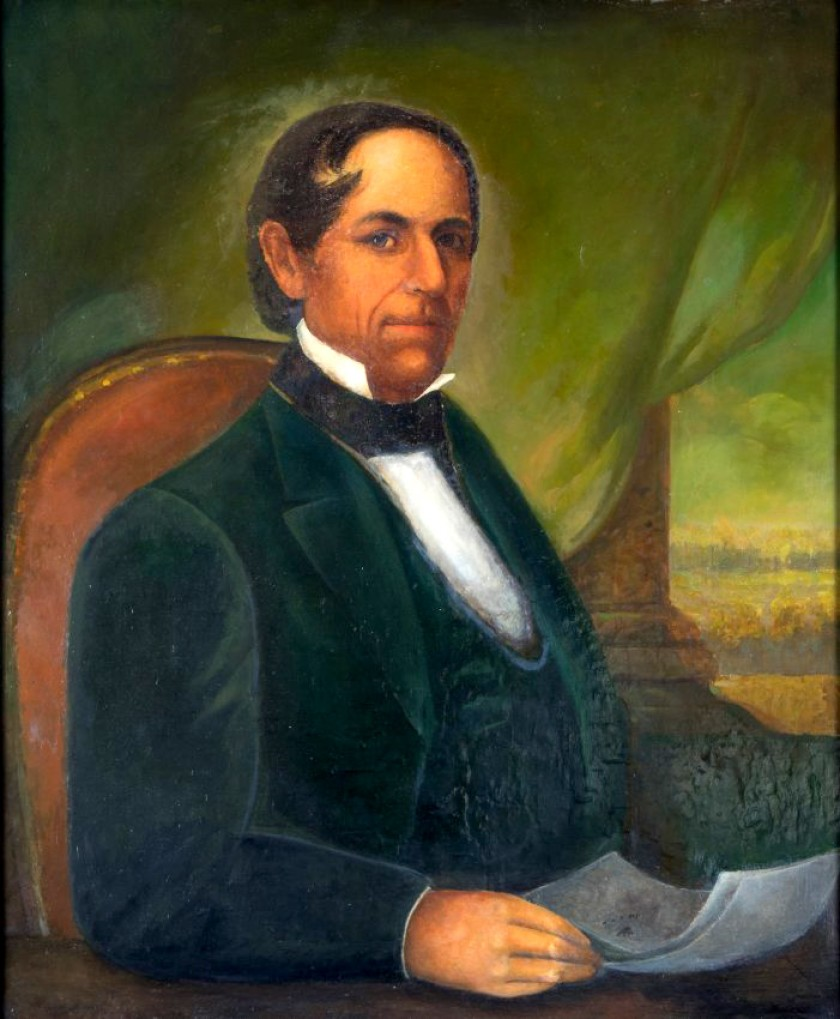
Manuel Domínguez, a signer of the Californian Constitution and owner of Rancho San Pedro, which included all of Palos Verdes.

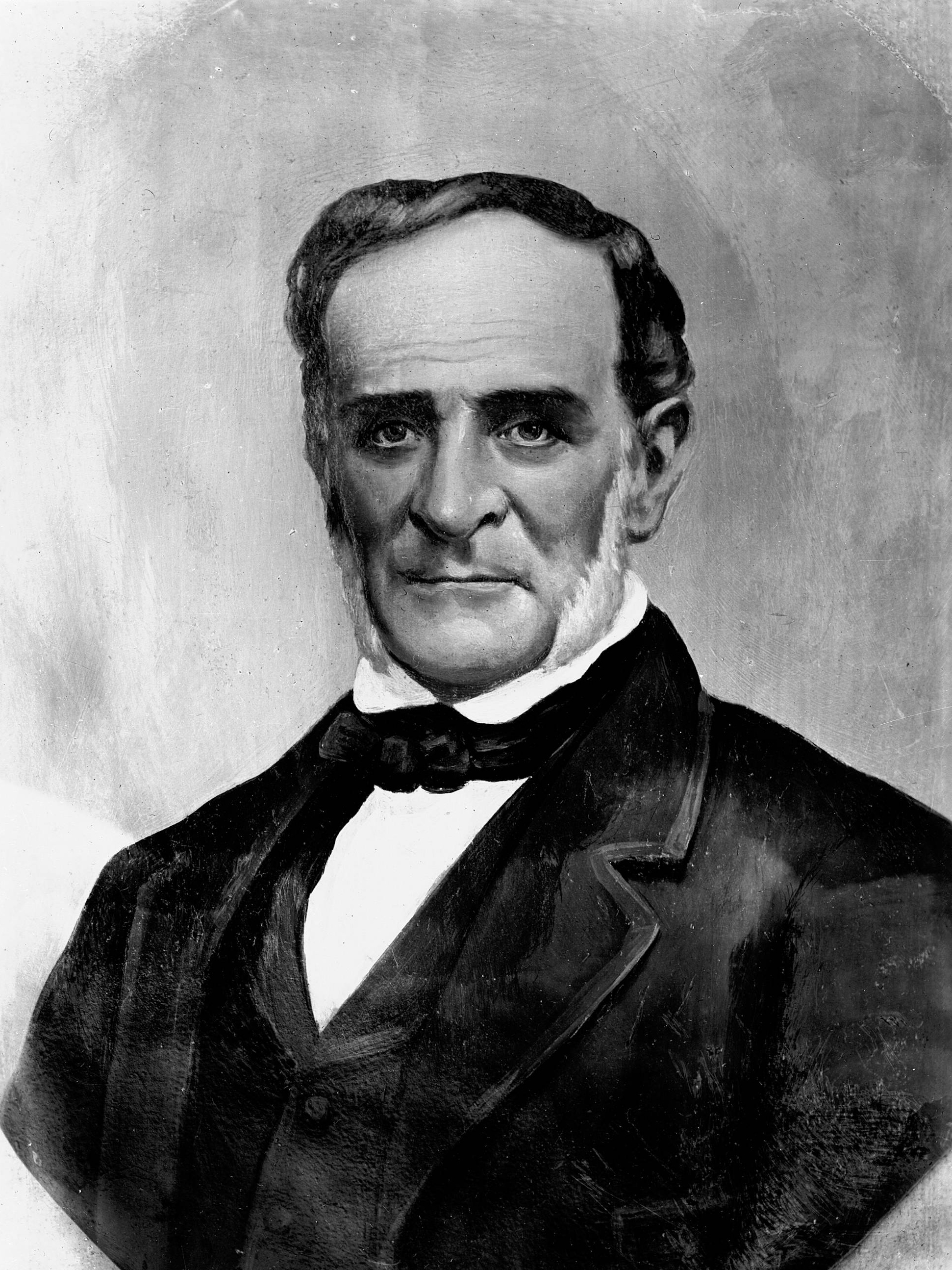
In 1846, Rancho de los Palos Verdes was separated from Rancho San Pedro and granted to José Loreto Sepúlveda (shown) and Juan Capistrano Sepúlveda.

The Tongva originally lived in the area.

Palos Verdes Estates was established as a planned community in 1923, with 3,200 acres (1,300 ha) carved out of the former Rancho de los Palos Verdes property of over 16,000 acres (6,500 ha). Frank A. Vanderlip established both a land syndicate holding the Palos Verdes Peninsula, and a real estate development trust for the Palos Verdes Estates subdivision. The Commonwealth Trust Company filed the Palos Verdes Protective Restrictions in Los Angeles County in 1923. These restrictions established rules for the developer and all land owners. The developer was required to set aside half of the land for common use, including roads and parks, but also to build bridle paths, a golf course, and retain several miles of coastline free of development. No less than ninety percent of the remaining land was required to be used for single-family homes.

The designers of Palos Verdes Estates, Frederick Law Olmsted Jr. and Charles Cheney, used deed restrictions (restrictive covenants) as a method of controlling development of the subdivision, even after many of the lots were sold. The deed restrictions prohibited nuisance businesses, such as polluting industries, but also bars and cemeteries. The deed restrictions also included an exclusionary racial covenant which forbade an owner from selling or renting a house to anyone who wasn't white. They were also not permitted to have African-Americans on their property with the exception of chauffeurs, gardeners, and domestic servants. The "sundown rule" was strictly in effect, and it was not until 1948 that such restrictions were declared unconstitutional. It took 20 more years until the Fair Housing Act was passed in 1968 for the reality of the civil rights protections to take hold. Under the covenants, an art jury reviewed all building plans, regulating any structure in regard to style, material, and even small details like color and the pitch of the roof. The construction of fences and hedges were subject to evaluation by the art jury.

The city's oldest building is La Venta Inn built in 1923 as a sales office for Vanderlip and his business associates. Other buildings were erected mostly around the shopping area in Malaga Cove. Palos Verdes Estates was finally incorporated in 1939. The Malaga Cove Plaza building and the Palos Verdes Public Library, were designed by Pasadena architect Myron Hunt, and was placed on the National Register of Historic Places in 1995. The Neptune fountain situated in the center of Malaga Cove Plaza is faithful replica of the original bronze Fontana del Nettuno designed by Italian artist Tommaso Laureti and erected in Bologna, Italy in 1563.

== Geography ==
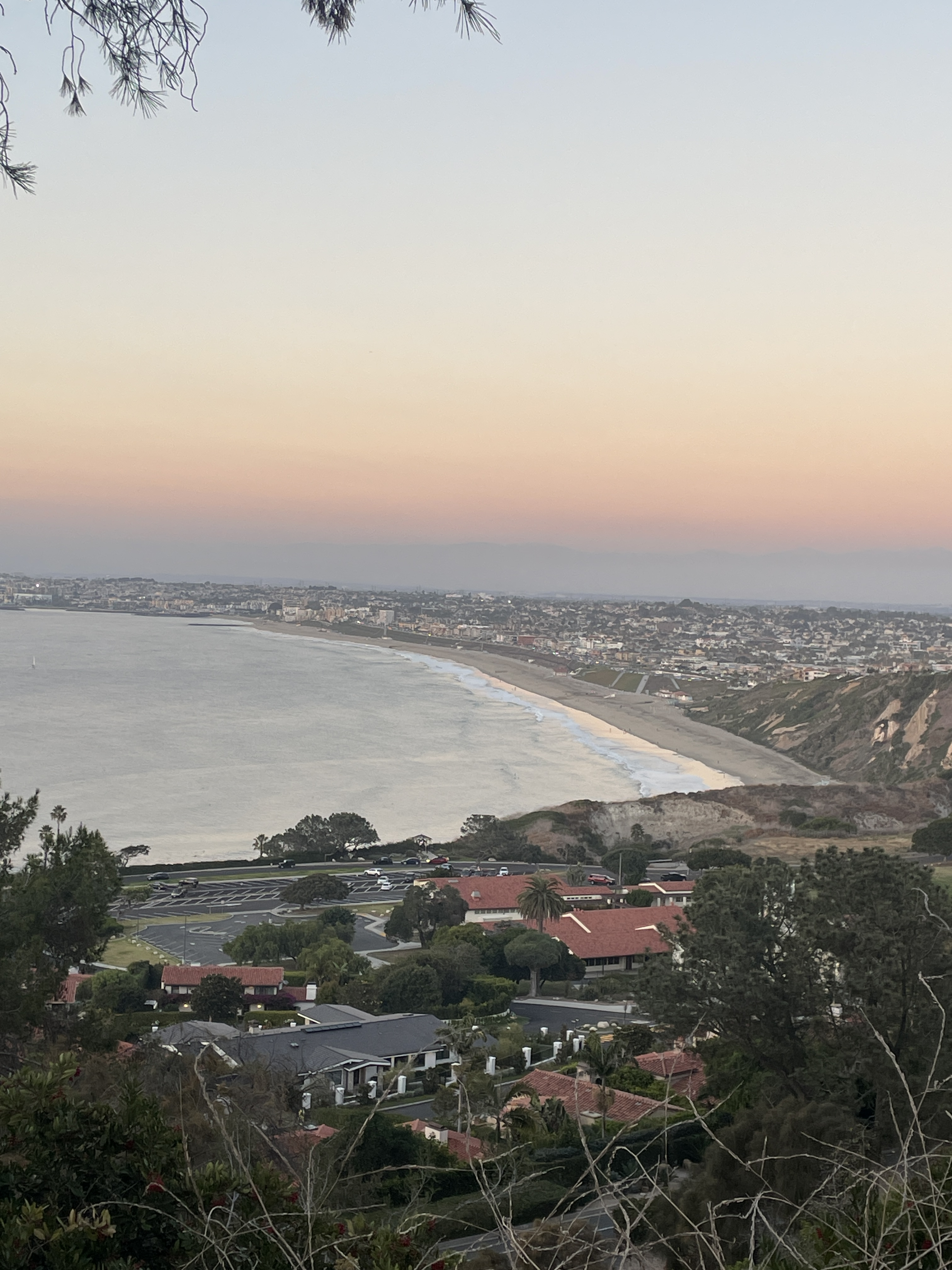
Lower Malaga Cove and Rat Beach in Palos Verdes Estates.

According to the United States Census Bureau, the city has a total area of 4.8 square miles (12 km^{2}), over 99% of which is land. The city is bordered by Torrance to the north and east, Rancho Palos Verdes to the south, and Rolling Hills Estates to the southeast.

== Demographics ==
Historical population
| Census | Pop. | Note | %± |
|---|---|---|---|
| 1940 | 987 | | — |
| 1950 | 1,963 | | 98.9% |
| 1960 | 9,564 | | 387.2% |
| 1970 | 13,631 | | 42.5% |
| 1980 | 14,376 | | 5.5% |
| 1990 | 13,512 | | −6.0% |
| 2000 | 13,340 | | −1.3% |
| 2010 | 13,438 | | 0.7% |
| 2020 | 13,347 | | −0.7% |
U.S. Decennial Census; 1860–1870 1880-1890; 1900 1910 1920; 1930 1940 1950; 1960 1970 1980; 1990 2000 2010; 2020

=== Racial and ethnic composition ===
Palos Verdes Estates city, California – Racial and ethnic composition Note: the US Census treats Hispanic/Latino as an ethnic category. This table excludes Latinos from the racial categories and assigns them to a separate category. Hispanics/Latinos may be of any race.
| Race / Ethnicity (NH = Non-Hispanic) | Pop 1980 | Pop 1990 | Pop 2000 | Pop 2010 | Pop 2020 | % 1980 | % 1990 | % 2000 | % 2010 | % 2020 |
|---|---|---|---|---|---|---|---|---|---|---|
| White alone (NH) | 13,144 | 11,105 | 10,155 | 9,868 | 8,544 | 91.43% | 82.19% | 76.12% | 73.43% | 64.01% |
| Black or African American alone (NH) | 141 | 154 | 130 | 156 | 166 | 0.98% | 1.14% | 0.97% | 1.16% | 1.24% |
| Native American or Alaska Native alone (NH) | 14 | 12 | 14 | 14 | 16 | 0.10% | 0.09% | 0.10% | 0.10% | 0.12% |
| Asian alone (NH) | 659 | 1,840 | 2,283 | 2,306 | 2,713 | 4.58% | 13.62% | 17.11% | 17.16% | 20.33% |
| Native Hawaiian or Pacific Islander alone (NH) | 659 | 1,840 | 12 | 8 | 4 | 4.58% | 13.62% | 0.09% | 0.06% | 0.03% |
| Other race alone (NH) | 58 | 3 | 34 | 22 | 85 | 0.40% | 0.02% | 0.25% | 0.16% | 0.64% |
| Mixed race or Multiracial (NH) | x | x | 334 | 433 | 816 | x | x | 2.50% | 3.22% | 6.11% |
| Hispanic or Latino (any race) | 360 | 398 | 378 | 631 | 1,003 | 2.50% | 2.95% | 2.83% | 4.70% | 7.51% |
| Total | 14,376 | 13,512 | 13,340 | 13,438 | 13,347 | 100.00% | 100.00% | 100.00% | 100.00% | 100.00% |

=== 2020 census ===
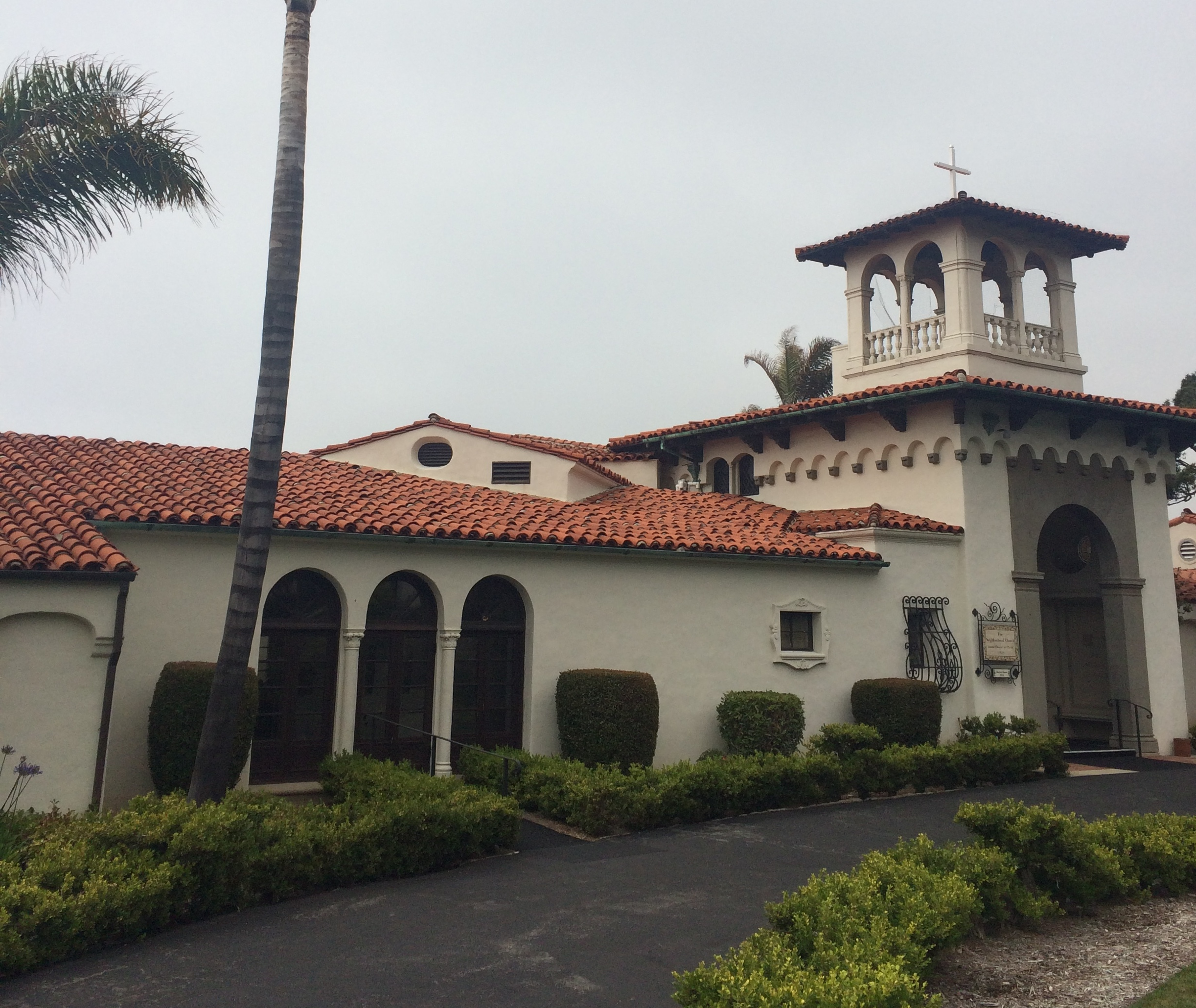
The Neighborhood Church.

As of the 2020 census, Palos Verdes Estates had a population of 13,347 and a population density of 2,794.6 inhabitants per square mile (1,079.0/km^{2}). The age distribution was 20.1% under the age of 18, 7.5% aged 18 to 24, 12.3% aged 25 to 44, 31.9% aged 45 to 64, and 28.2% who were 65 years of age or older. The median age was 52.4 years. For every 100 females, there were 93.0 males, and for every 100 females age 18 and over there were 90.0 males age 18 and over. 100.0% of residents lived in urban areas, while 0.0% lived in rural areas.

The whole population lived in households. There were 5,017 households in Palos Verdes Estates, of which 30.0% had children under the age of 18 living in them. Of all households, 67.9% were married-couple households, 2.5% were cohabiting couple households, 9.7% were households with a male householder and no spouse or partner present, and 19.8% were households with a female householder and no spouse or partner present. About 17.6% of households were made up of individuals, and 12.1% had someone living alone who was 65 years of age or older. The average household size was 2.66. There were 3,973 families (79.2% of all households).

There were 5,291 housing units at an average density of 1,107.8 units per square mile (427.7 units/km^{2}), of which 5,017 (94.8%) were occupied and 274 (5.2%) were vacant. Of occupied units, 87.4% were owner-occupied and 12.6% were occupied by renters. The homeowner vacancy rate was 1.4%, and the rental vacancy rate was 5.5%.

=== 2023 ACS estimates ===
In 2023, the US Census Bureau estimated that the median household income was $247,500, and the per capita income was $142,117. About 2.4% of families and 2.6% of the population were below the poverty line.

=== 2010 census ===
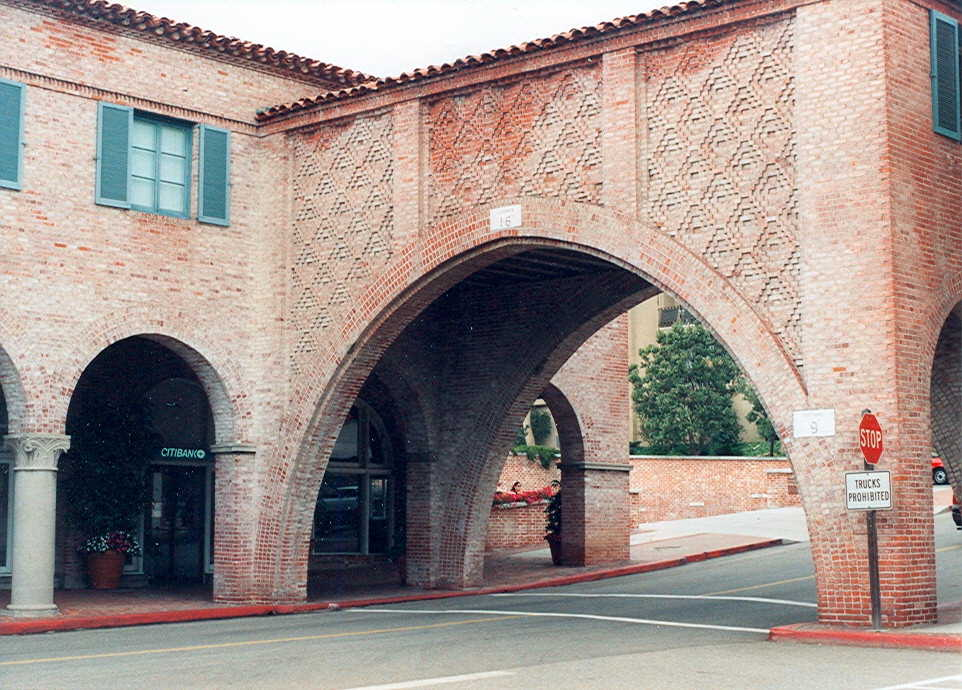
Malaga Cove Plaza was built in a Spanish Renaissance style in 1925.

The 2010 United States census reported that Palos Verdes Estates had a population of 13,438. The population density was 2,814.8 inhabitants per square mile (1,086.8/km^{2}). The racial makeup of Palos Verdes Estates was 10,346 (77.0%) White (73.4% Non-Hispanic White), 161 (1.2%) African American, 21 (0.2%) Native American, 2,322 (17.3%) Asian, 8 (0.1%) Pacific Islander, 94 (0.7%) from other races, and 486 (3.6%) from two or more races. There were 631 people (4.7%) of Hispanic or Latino origin, of any race.

The Census reported that 13,421 people (99.9% of the population) lived in households, 17 (0.1%) lived in non-institutionalized group quarters, and 0 (0%) were institutionalized.

There were 5,066 households, out of which 1,686 (33.3%) had children under the age of 18 living in them, 3,649 (72.0%) were opposite-sex married couples living together, 296 (5.8%) had a female householder with no husband present, 138 (2.7%) had a male householder with no wife present. There were 91 (1.8%) unmarried opposite-sex partnerships, and 26 (0.5%) same-sex married couples or partnerships. 848 households (16.7%) were made up of individuals, and 534 (10.5%) had someone living alone who was 65 years of age or older. The average household size was 2.65. There were 4,083 families (80.6% of all households); the average family size was 2.97.

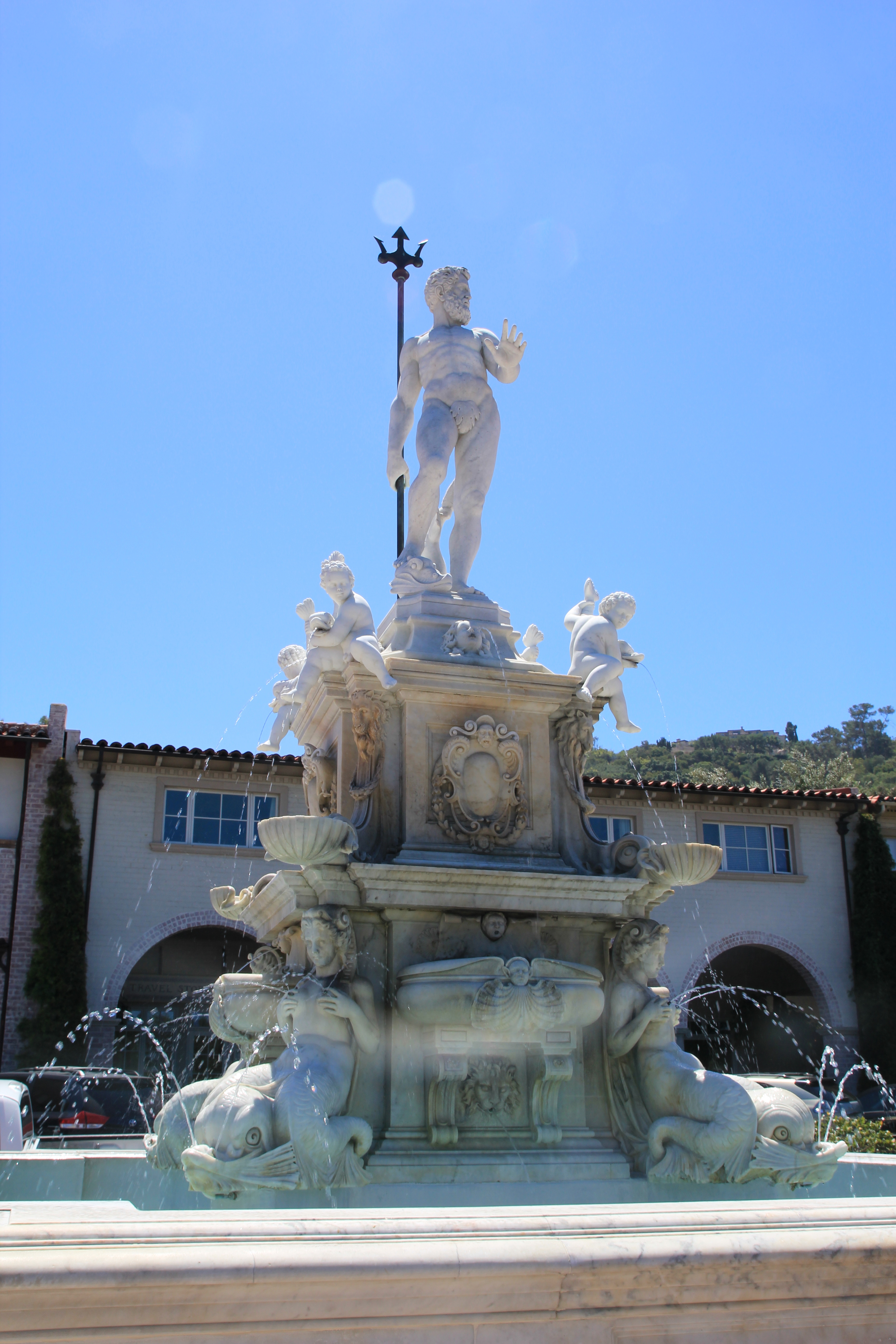
Neptune Fountain, Malaga Cove Plaza

The population was spread out, with 3,113 people (23.2%) under the age of 18, 588 people (4.4%) aged 18 to 24, 1,787 people (13.3%) aged 25 to 44, 4,702 people (35.0%) aged 45 to 64, and 3,248 people (24.2%) who were 65 years of age or older. The median age was 49.9 years. For every 100 females, there were 95.2 males. For every 100 females age 18 and over, there were 93.0 males.

There were 5,283 housing units at an average density of 1,106.6 per square mile (427.3/km^{2}), of which 4,496 (88.7%) were owner-occupied, and 570 (11.3%) were occupied by renters. The homeowner vacancy rate was 0.7%; the rental vacancy rate was 5.6%. 11,958 people (89.0% of the population) lived in owner-occupied housing units and 1,463 people (10.9%) lived in rental housing units.

According to the 2010-2014 U.S. Census, the median income for a household in Palos Verdes Estates was $171,328. The per capita income for the city was $87,408.

=== Mapping L.A. ===
Mapping L.A. reported that in 2000, English and German were the most common ancestries. Taiwan and Japan were the most common foreign places of birth.

== Government and infrastructure ==
=== Public safety ===
Palos Verdes Estates is the only city on the Palos Verdes Peninsula to have its own police department (the other three peninsula cities contract with the Los Angeles County Sheriff's Department, using the station in nearby Lomita). The department currently has 25 officers. These officers are assigned to different divisions such as traffic, patrol and detectives. The city also has its own dispatch center and jail. Both are staffed 24 hours a day. The current Police Chief is Luke Hellinga.

Fire prevention and paramedic response services are provided by the Los Angeles County Fire Department with engine company firehouse facilities located within the city limits.

The Los Angeles County Department of Health Services operates the Torrance Health Center in Harbor Gateway, Los Angeles, near Torrance and serving Palos Verdes Estates.

Starting around 1990, the Palos Verdes Estates Police Department was criticized for not taking steps to stop harassment by the Lunada Bay Boys group of surfers. Palos Verdes Estates Police Chief Jeff Kepley has acknowledged that officers in his department "may have relationships with surfers accused of tormenting outsiders". In March 2016, lawsuits were filed by several non-local surfers against the city of Palos Verdes Estates, alleging that the city police ignored the harassment and never investigated or punished the perpetrators. In September 2024, the city settled the lawsuit and agreed to, among other things, have the police department begin investigating claims of harassment. The city also agreed to pay the plaintiff's attorney fees, estimated at between $1M and $4M.

=== County, state, and federal representation ===
In the state legislature Palos Verdes Estates is located in the 24th senatorial district, represented by Democrat Ben Allen, and in the 66th Assembly district, represented by Democrat Al Muratsuchi.

In the United States House of Representatives, Palos Verdes Estates is in California's 36th congressional district, represented by Democrat Ted Lieu.

The United States Postal Service Palos Verdes Estates Post Office is located in Suite 102 at 2516 Via Tejon.

=== Politics ===
Palos Verdes Estates was a mostly Republican jurisdiction in the 20th century and early 21st century, but voted for Hillary Clinton, Joe Biden, and Kamala Harris in the 2016, 2020, and 2024 presidential elections.

== Education ==
=== Primary and secondary schools ===
==== Public schools ====
The city is served by the Palos Verdes Peninsula Unified School District. A previous The Washington Post study ranked the nearby Palos Verdes Peninsula High School (the "Panthers"; enrollment 2,400) as the #8 best among public and private high schools in the United States. U.S. News & World Report recently academically ranked it #89 among 18,500 U.S. high schools, and Newsweek ranked it #146. In 2014, thedailybeast.com ranked the two area high schools as the 44th and 121st best high schools in the country.

Palos Verdes Peninsula High School also annually honors the largest collection of National Merit Scholar recipients (usually 50–60) enrolled in a U.S. high school in any year. In any given year there is routinely a dozen-way or more tie for the valedictorian (highest grade point average) honors in the graduating class. The smaller enrollment Palos Verdes High School (the "Sea Kings"; enrollment 1,900) achieved the same API score as Palos Verdes Peninsula High School (898). Both schools' students and faculties in science and computer science curricula are participants in national robotic engineering advancement, and have competed against universities (Caltech, Stanford, Princeton, Cornell) and defense contractor firms in government-sponsored robotic science application challenges (example: The Sea Kings competed in the 2005 DARPA Grand Challenge; the only U.S. high school to do so).

==== Private schools ====
Chadwick School is another well known school in the area. It is a K-12 independent, nonsectarian school which was established in 1935.

In 1992 the International Bilingual School, a Japanese preparatory school for grades K-9, moved to Palos Verdes Estates. By 2002 the PVUSD had filed suit to force the International Bilingual School to leave the property that the school was located in. The PVUSD owned the school building.

==== Public libraries ====
The Palos Verdes Library District operates the Malaga Cove Library in Palos Verdes Estates.

== Notable people ==
- Matt Barnes (born 1980) – Forward for the Golden State Warriors (born in Santa Clara, California)
- Chester Bennington (1976–2017) – Musician and lead singer of Linkin Park (Originally from Phoenix, Arizona)
- David Benoit (born 1953) – Musician (born in Bakersfield, California)
- Robert DeLeo (born 1966) – Bassist and co-founder of Stone Temple Pilots (Originally from Montclair, New Jersey)
- Bill Laimbeer (born 1957) – American basketball player (Detroit Pistons) - Originally from Boston, Massachusetts
- Daniel Levitin (born 1957) – Best-selling author, neuroscientist, musician (born in San Francisco, California)
- Matt Manfredi (born 1971) - American screenwriter (born and raised in Palos Verdes Estates)
- Randy Nauert (1945-2019) – Bassist and co-founder of The Challengers (born and raised in Palos Verdes Estates)
- Donald Peterman (1932–2011) – Academy Award-nominated cinematographer (born in Los Angeles, California)
- Christen Press (born 1988) – American soccer forward and World Cup champion (born in Los Angeles, California)
- Shahbudin Rahimtoola (1931–2018) – Cardiologist (Originally from Bombay, India)
- Anderson Silva (born 1975) – UFC Middleweight Champion (Originally from São Paulo, SP, Brazil)
- Gary Wright (1943-2023) – Musician (Originally from Cresskill, New Jersey)

== See also ==
- List of sundown towns in the United States
