= Bay League =

The Bay League is a high school athletic conference in the South Bay region of Los Angeles County, California affiliated with the CIF Southern Section.

== Member schools ==
- Culver City High School
- Mira Costa High School
- Palos Verdes High School
- Peninsula High School
- Redondo Union High School
- Santa Monica High School

== Former members ==
- Centennial High School
- Leuzinger High School
