= Rolling Hills, California =

City in California, United States

- City
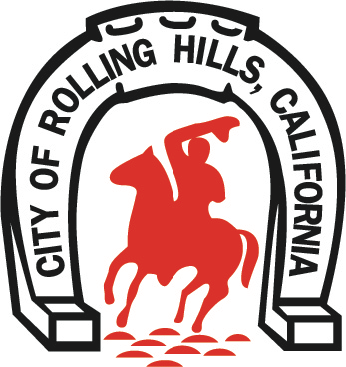
- Seal
- Interactive map of Rolling Hills, California
- Location in the United States
- Coordinates: 33°45′34″N 118°20′30″W
- Country: United States
- State: California
- County: Los Angeles
- Incorporated: January 24, 1957

Government
  - Type: Council-Manager
  - Mayor: Jeff Pieper
  - City Manager: Karina Bañales

Area
  - Total: 2.99 sq mi (7.75 km^{2})
  - Land: 2.99 sq mi (7.75 km^{2})
  - Water: 0 sq mi (0.00 km^{2}) 0%
- Elevation: 1,276 ft (389 m)

Population (2020)
  - Total: 1,739
  - Density: 581/sq mi (224/km^{2})
- Time zone: UTC-8 (Pacific)
  - Summer (DST): UTC-7 (PDT)
- ZIP code: 90274
- Area codes: 310/424
- FIPS code: 06-62602
- GNIS feature IDs: 1661325, 2410986
- Website: www.rolling-hills.org

Rolling Hills is a city on the Palos Verdes Peninsula, in Los Angeles County, California, United States. Rolling Hills is a gated community with private roads with three entry gates. Homes are single-story and built in the 19th-century California ranch or Spanish hacienda styles exemplified by architect Wallace Neff. Incorporated in 1957, Rolling Hills maintains a rural and equestrian character, with no traffic lights, multi-acre lots with ample space between homes, and wide equestrian paths along streets and property lines.

Rolling Hills has the third highest median house value in the United States. Homes are required to have white exterior paint. Homeowners are also required to maintain horse property on their lots, or at minimum keep land where stalls could be built. The community was developed by A. E. Hanson, who also developed Hidden Hills.

Residents work, shop, attend school, and obtain other services in the other towns on the Palos Verdes Peninsula as the only commercially zoned land within the city is occupied by the Rolling Hills City Hall, Rolling Hills Community Association, and LA County Fire Department Station 56. As of the 2020 census, the city population was 1,739, down from 1,860 at the 2010 census.

== Geography ==
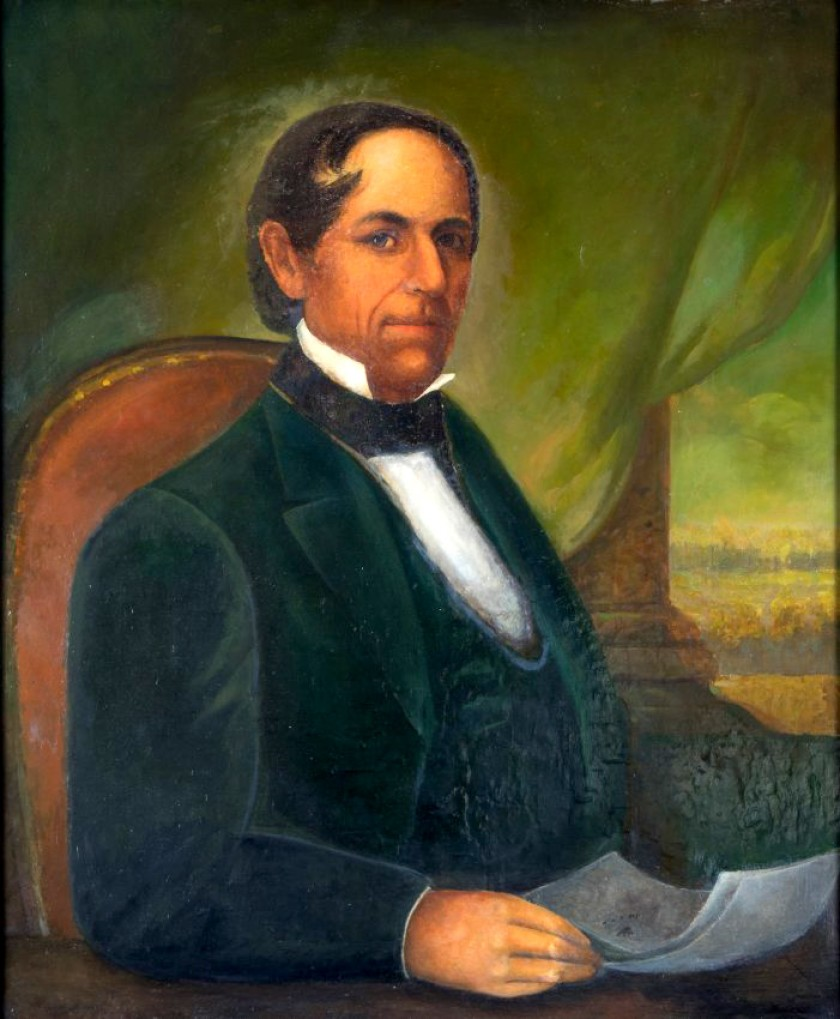
Manuel Domínguez, a signer of the Californian Constitution and owner of Rancho San Pedro, which included all of Palos Verdes.

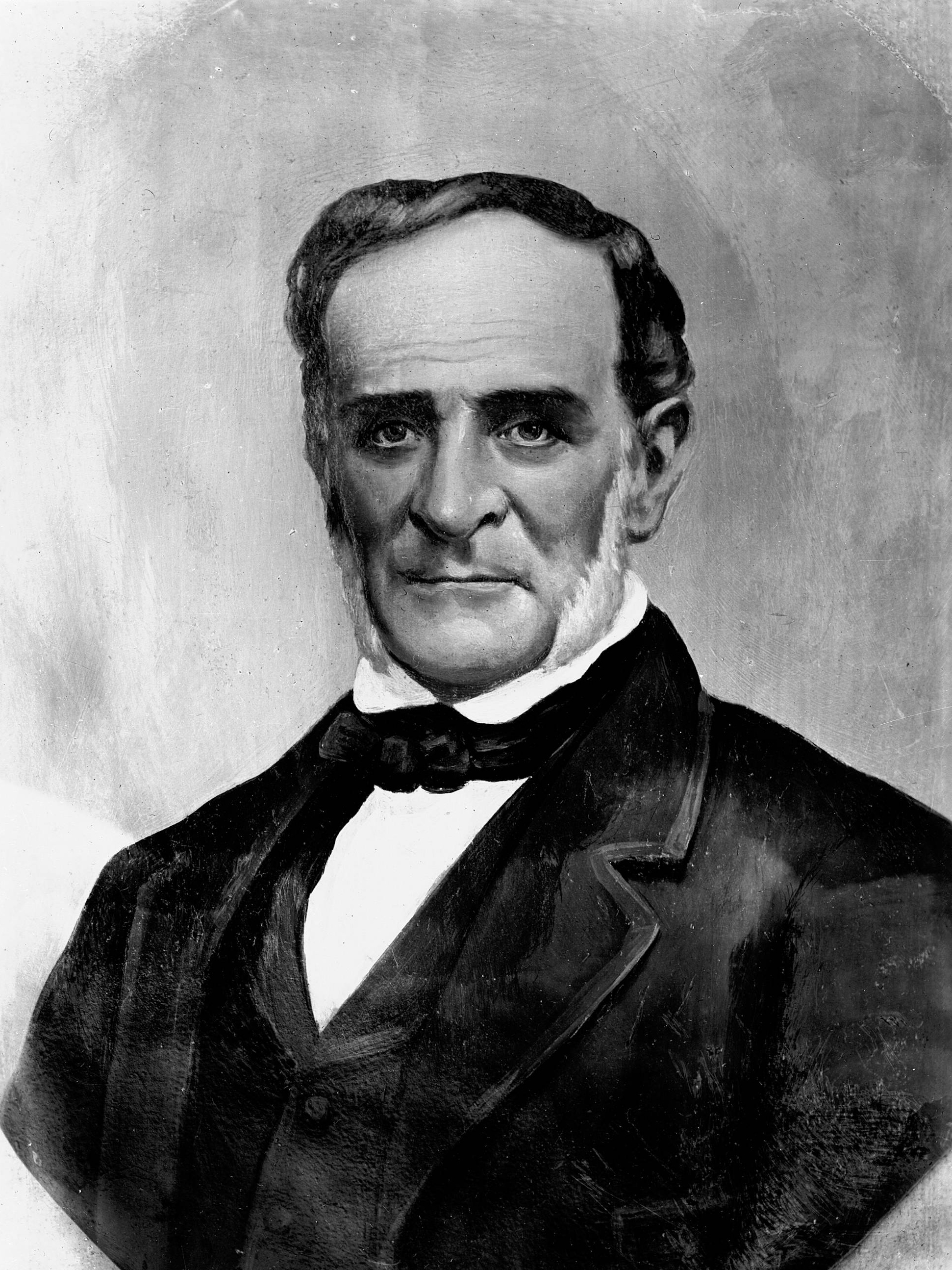
In 1846, Rancho de los Palos Verdes was separated from Rancho San Pedro and granted to José Loreto Sepúlveda (shown) and Juan Capistrano Sepúlveda.

The city borders Rolling Hills Estates to the north and Rancho Palos Verdes on all other sides (including the empty Portuguese Bend landslide area to the south).

Rolling Hills is located at 33°45′34″N 118°20′30″W (33.759350, −118.341550).

According to the United States Census Bureau, the city has a total area of 3.0 square miles (7.8 km^{2}), all land.

== Climate ==
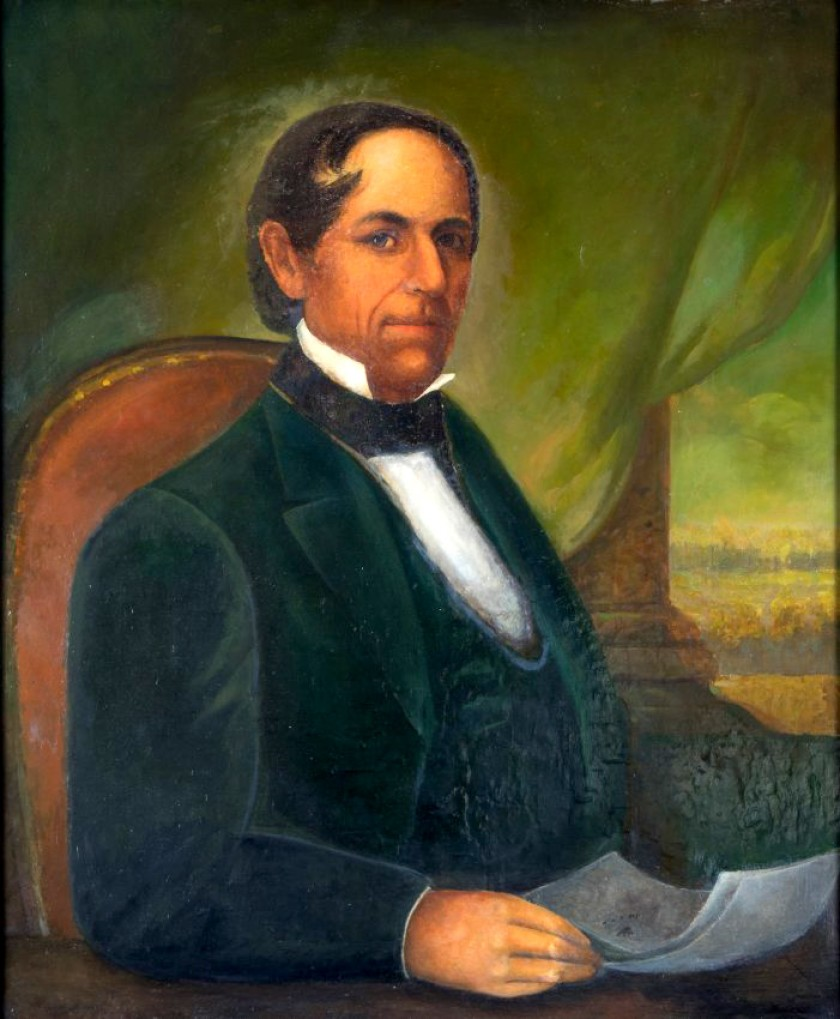
Manuel Domínguez, a signer of the Californian Constitution and owner of Rancho San Pedro, which included all of Palos Verdes.

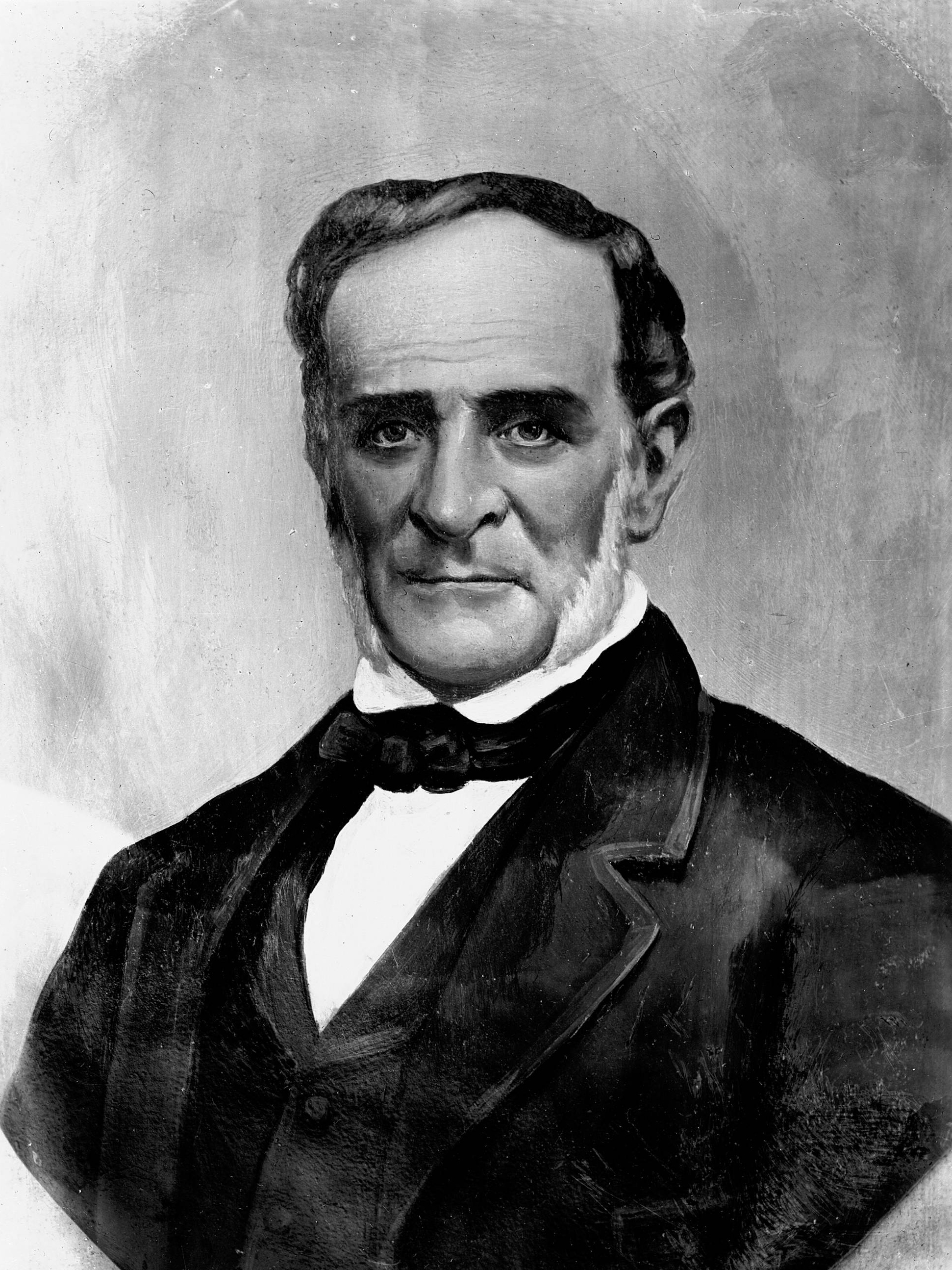
In 1846, Rancho de los Palos Verdes was separated from Rancho San Pedro and granted to José Loreto Sepúlveda (shown) and Juan Capistrano Sepúlveda.

Rolling Hills has a cold semi-arid climate (Köppen: BSk). Summers are dry, and hotter than the surrounding areas, typically reaching 93 °F (34 °C) at its peak in early September. Winters tend to be colder than the surrounding areas, with high temperatures in the high 50s to the low 60s. Hailstorms typically occur at least once every winter.

== Demographics ==
Historical population
Census	Pop.	Note	%±
1960	1,664		—
1970	2,050		23.2%
1980	2,049		0.0%
1990	1,871		−8.7%
2000	1,871		0.0%
2010	1,860		−0.6%
2020	1,739		−6.5%
U.S. Decennial Census; 1860–1870 1880-1890; 1900 1910 1920; 1930 1940 1950; 1960 1970 1980; 1990 2000 2010; 2020

Rolling Hills first appeared as a city in the 1960 U.S. census as part of the Palos Verdes census county division.

=== Racial and ethnic composition ===
Rolling Hills city, California – Racial and ethnic composition Note: the US Census treats Hispanic/Latino as an ethnic category. This table excludes Latinos from the racial categories and assigns them to a separate category. Hispanics/Latinos may be of any race.
Race / Ethnicity (NH = Non-Hispanic)	Pop 1990	Pop 2000	Pop 2010	Pop 2020	% 1990	% 2000	% 2010	% 2020
White alone (NH)	1,577	1,432	1,379	1,128	84.29%	76.54%	74.14%	64.86%
Black or African American alone (NH)	26	38	27	23	1.39%	2.03%	1.45%	1.32%
Native American or Alaska Native alone (NH)	-	0	0	2	-	0.00%	0.00%	0.12%
Asian alone (NH)	186	262	302	354	9.94%	14.00%	16.24%	20.36%
Native Hawaiian or Pacific Islander alone (NH)	186	9	2	1	9.94%	0.48%	0.11%	0.06%
Other race alone (NH)	3	6	4	12	0.16%	0.32%	0.22%	0.69%
Mixed race or Multiracial (NH)	x	39	44	97	x	2.08%	2.37%	5.58%
Hispanic or Latino (any race)	79	85	102	122	4.22%	4.54%	5.48%	7.02%
Total	1,871	1,871	1,860	1,739	100.00%	100.00%	100.00%	100.00%

=== 2020 census ===
As of the 2020 census, Rolling Hills had a population of 1,739. The population density was 581.4 inhabitants per square mile (224.5/km^{2}). The racial makeup of Rolling Hills was 1,147 (66.0%) White, 23 (1.3%) African American, 3 (0.2%) Native American, 356 (20.5%) Asian, 1 (0.1%) Pacific Islander, 29 (1.7%) from other races, and 180 (10.4%) from two or more races. Hispanic or Latino of any race were 122 persons (7.0%).

The whole population lived in households. 100.0% of residents lived in urban areas, while 0.0% lived in rural areas.

There were 639 households, out of which 172 (26.9%) had children under the age of 18 living in them, 441 (69.0%) were married-couple households, 21 (3.3%) were cohabiting couple households, 118 (18.5%) had a female householder with no partner present, and 59 (9.2%) had a male householder with no partner present. 95 households (14.9%) were one person, and 72 (11.3%) were one person aged 65 or older. The average household size was 2.72. There were 516 families (80.8% of all households).

The age distribution was 258 people (14.8%) under the age of 18, 160 people (9.2%) aged 18 to 24, 242 people (13.9%) aged 25 to 44, 519 people (29.8%) aged 45 to 64, and 560 people (32.2%) who were 65 years of age or older. The median age was 55.5 years. For every 100 females, there were 87.0 males, and for every 100 females age 18 and over there were 85.6 males.

There were 702 housing units at an average density of 234.7 units per square mile (90.6 units/km^{2}), of which 639 (91.0%) were occupied. Of these, 610 (95.5%) were owner-occupied, and 29 (4.5%) were occupied by renters. There were 63 vacant housing units (9.0%). The homeowner vacancy rate was 0.8%, and the rental vacancy rate was 3.3%.

=== Income and poverty ===
In 2023, the US Census Bureau estimated that the median household income was more than $250,000, and the per capita income was $173,820. About 4.3% of families and 7.2% of the population were below the poverty line.

=== 2010 census ===
At the 2010 census Rolling Hills had a population of 1,860. The population density was 622.0 inhabitants per square mile (240.2/km^{2}). The racial makeup of Rolling Hills was 1,437 (77.3%) White (74.1% Non-Hispanic White), 29 (1.6%) African American, 5 (0.3%) Native American, 303 (16.3%) Asian, 2 (0.1%) Pacific Islander, 24 (1.3%) from other races, and 60 (3.2%) from two or more races. Hispanic or Latino of any race were 102 people (5.5%).

The whole population lived in households, no one lived in non-institutionalized group quarters and no one was institutionalized.

There were 663 households, 199 (30.0%) had children under the age of 18 living in them, 491 (74.1%) were opposite-sex married couples living together, 27 (4.1%) had a female householder with no husband present, 21 (3.2%) had a male householder with no wife present. There were 11 (1.7%) unmarried opposite-sex partnerships, and 9 (1.4%) same-sex married couples or partnerships. 98 households (14.8%) were one person and 66 (10.0%) had someone living alone who was 65 or older. The average household size was 2.81. There were 539 families (81.3% of households); the average family size was 3.08.

The age distribution was 404 people (21.7%) under the age of 18, 109 people (5.9%) aged 18 to 24, 191 people (10.3%) aged 25 to 44, 643 people (34.6%) aged 45 to 64, and 513 people (27.6%) who were 65 or older. The median age was 51.7 years. For every 100 females, there were 91.8 males. For every 100 females age 18 and over, there were 91.1 males.

There were 663 occupied housing units at an average density of 239.4 per square mile (92.4/km^{2}), of which 635 were owner-occupied, and 28 were occupied by renters. The homeowner vacancy rate was 1.4%; the rental vacancy rate was 3.4%. 1,778 people (95.6% of the population) lived in owner-occupied housing units and 82 people (4.4%) lived in rental housing units.

=== 2000 census ===
At the 2000 census, Rolling Hills was the 21st richest place in the United States (based upon per capita income), and 4th richest for places with a population of at least 1,000.

== Education ==
The city is served by Palos Verdes Peninsula Unified School District. PVPUSD schools have constantly ranked among the best in California and the nation. Since 2013, the Washington Post has consistently recognized Palos Verdes Peninsula High School in the publication's list of "America's Most Challenging Schools" and once listed it as the 8th best public or private high school in the nation. School data website, niche.com ranked Palos Verdes Peninsula High School #9 of California's best public high schools of 2016. The prestigious Chadwick School is an independent 45 acre, K-12 private school that also serves the area. According to Business Insider, in 2014 niche.com named Chadwick as one of the top private high schools in America.

== Politics ==
United States presidential election results for Rolling Hills, California
Year	Republican		Democratic		Third party(ies)	
Year	No.	%	No.	%	No.	%
2000	559	73.94%	175	23.15%	22	2.91%
2004	558	70.28%	226	28.46%	10	1.26%
2008	805	64.71%	418	33.60%	21	1.69%
2012	838	71.69%	311	26.60%	20	1.71%
2016	663	58.83%	397	35.23%	67	5.94%
2020	723	54.86%	567	43.02%	28	2.12%
2024	647	56.21%	476	41.36%	28	2.43%

In 2009, Rolling Hills had the third highest percentage of registered Republicans of any city in California, with 61.3% of its 1,441 registered voters registered as Republicans. 19.4% of voters were registered Democrats, and 16.3% "declined to state."

As of February 10, 2021, there were 1,577 registered voters in Rolling Hills, California. Of these voters, 737 (46.73%) were registered with the Republican party, 388 (24.60%) were registered with the Democratic Party, 357 (22.64%) were not affiliated with a political party, and 95 (6.02%) were registered with a third party. According to that same report, Rolling Hills is one of only ten incorporated municipalities in Los Angeles County that has more registered Republicans than registered Democrats, out of 87 total.

Rolling Hills has voted for the Republican candidate in every presidential and gubernatorial election since its incorporation, often by large margins. In 2016, Los Angeles County gave Donald Trump roughly 21% of the vote, and Rolling Hills was one of only five cities in Los Angeles County that was carried by Trump. In 2020, the city supported Trump's re-election bid by a margin of 11.84%. This was the lowest margin of victory for a Republican presidential candidate since Rolling Hills's formal incorporation as a city.

== Government ==
Rolling Hills was incorporated in 1957. It has a council-manager form of government. The city council consists of five members, one of whom is appointed mayor on an annual basis.

=== State and federal representation ===
In the California State Legislature, Rolling Hills is in the 24th senatorial district, represented by Democrat Ben Allen, and in the 66th Assembly district, represented by Democrat Al Muratsuchi.

In the United States House of Representatives, Rolling Hills is in California's 36th congressional district, represented by Democrat Ted Lieu.

== Services ==
The Los Angeles County Sheriff's Department (LASD) operates the Lomita Station in Lomita, serving Rolling Hills.

The Los Angeles County Department of Health Services operates the Torrance Health Center in Harbor Gateway, Los Angeles, near Torrance and serving Rolling Hills.

== Notable people ==
- Tracy Austin, former world #1 tennis player and two-time US Open winner
- Colin Baxter, professional football player
- Ethan Walden Brown, founder, president, and CEO of Beyond Meat
- Brandon Holt, professional tennis player and son of Tracy Austin.
- Parnelli Jones, former professional race car driver and Indy car team owner
- Bruce Lee, actor and martial artist
- Erik Lorig (born 1986), NFL football player
- Mike Mentzer, Bodybuilder, businessman and author
- Alex McLeod, TV personality and host of Trading Spaces
- Greg Popovich, founder and owner of Castle Rock Winery
- Frank D. Robinson, founder of Robinson Helicopter Company
- John Tu, co-founder of Kingston Technology, a privately held, multinational computer technology corporation

== See also ==
- List of largest houses in the Los Angeles Metropolitan Area
- List of largest houses in the United States
