= Municipal Area Express =

- Founded: 1990
- Headquarters: 20500 Madrona Avenue
- Locale: Torrance, California
- Service area: coastal Los Angeles County, California
- Service type: bus service
- Routes: 3

Municipal Area Express provided mass transportation in suburban Los Angeles. The purpose of the system was to provide rush hour commuter service between the city's southwestern suburbs and the major places of employment near Los Angeles International Airport. Three routes each provided service four times per weekday. Service was discontinued on July 1, 2013.

== Route 2: Palos Verdes Peninsula ==
Traveled through Rancho Palos Verdes, Rolling Hills Estates, Torrance, and Lawndale.

== Route 3: San Pedro/Torrance ==
Traveled through the Los Angeles district of San Pedro, Lomita, Torrance, and Lawndale.

== Route 3X: Freeway Express/San Pedro ==
Traveled non-stop between San Pedro and El Segundo using expressways instead of suburban boulevards.
