= Promenade PV =

Shopping mall in Palos Verdes, California, United States

Promenade | PV
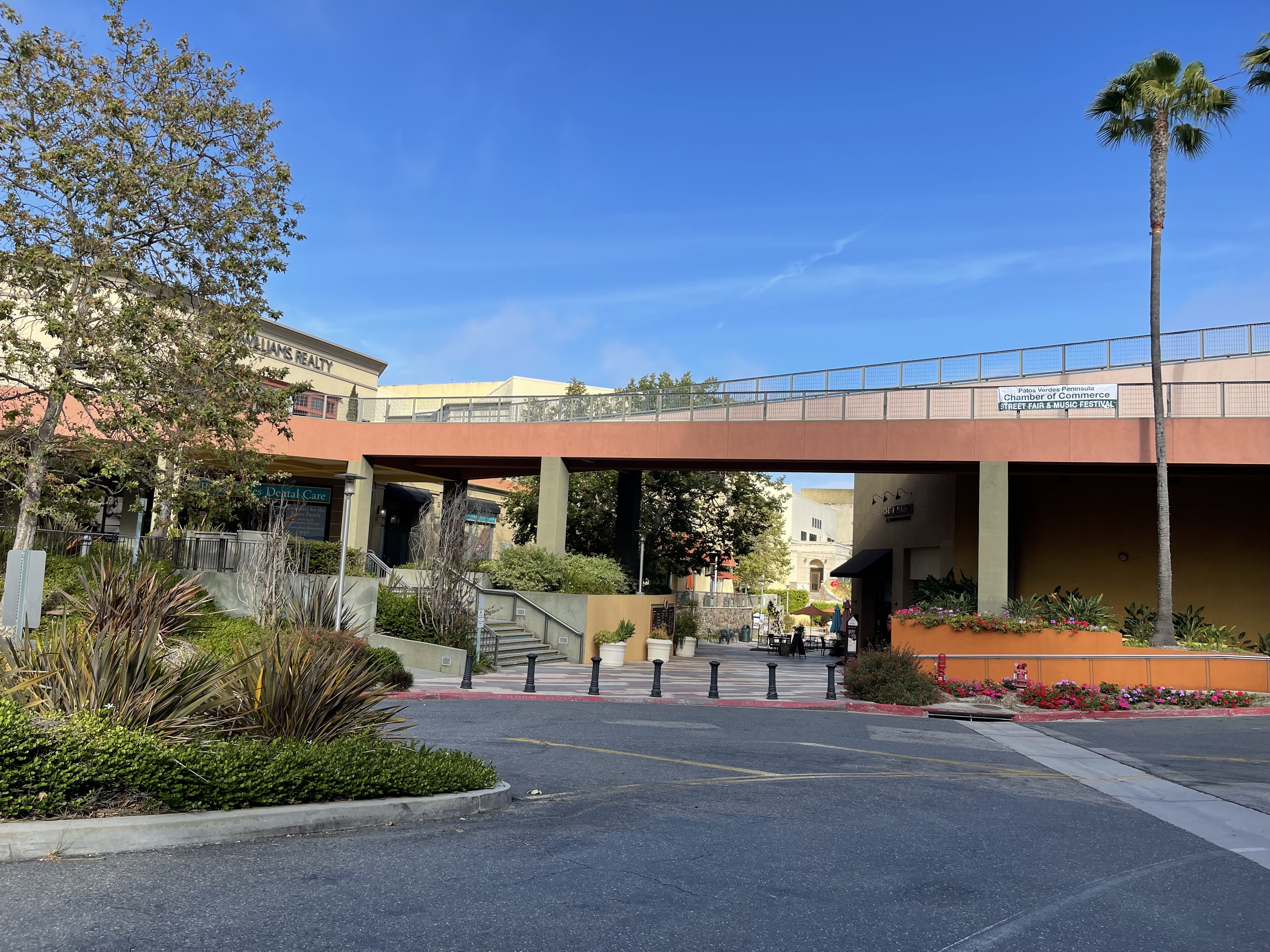
- Coordinates: 33.7721081°N 118.3736696°W
- Address: 550 Deep Valley Dr, Rolling Hills Estates, CA 90274
- Opened: Fall 1981
- Previous names: The Courtyard Mall
- Developer: Ernest Hahn and Ron Florance
- Owner: Stoltz Real Estate Partners

Promenade | PV is the current name of originally enclosed, now open-air regional shopping mall in Rolling Hills Estates on the affluent Palos Verdes Peninsula in the South Bay area of Greater Los Angeles. Former names include The Courtyard Mall, The Shops at Palos Verdes, The Avenue of the Peninsula, and The Promenade on the Peninsula.

== History ==
In November 1978, developers Ernest Hahn and Ron Florance revealed plans for a $40 million enclosed mall on a 14-acre site just east of the already existing Peninsula Center, a smaller center with Buffums as the only department store anchor. "The Courtyard Mall" as it was to be named, would launch with a Bullocks Wilshire and the May Company California as its department store anchors, plus 75 additional shops. It also debuted with a community theater and an indoor Ice Capades Chalet ice skating rink. The city council approved the plan in June 1979 and an agreement with the neighboring city of Rancho Palos Verdes was reached in March 1980.

The mall opened in Fall 1981 during the Early 1980s recession. By March 1982, 65 of the 92 stores were occupied. The ice skating rink was well patronized, but it proved difficult to attract shoppers from the immediate area who had already become accustomed to driving to what is now Del Amo Fashion Center which had a far wider selection of department and specialty stores. A fire in the center in April 1984 caused $1 million in damage. The mall was renovated in September 1988. The Hahn Company began an $11 million project to upgrade the mall and its tenants to become more attractive to the most upscale shoppers, and renamed it The Shops at Palos Verdes. The mall was doing relatively well and harming business at the next-door Peninsula Center

=== 1990s ===
In January 1997, the mall lost both department store anchors, the Robinsons-May (which had replaced May Company) and what had been the Bullocks Wilshire, as Macy's acquired the chain and closed stores. In February 1998, Cousins Properties of Atlanta bought the mall from the Hahn Co. for $13.5 million, and began another renovation, this time costing $78 million. The mall would be renamed The Avenue of the Peninsula. The mall closed for renovation from January to November 1999. The roof was removed and a more upscale selection of specialty shops was achieved, with new department store anchor Saks Fifth Avenue as well as Pottery Barn, Restoration Hardware and Abercrombie & Fitch opening in 1999 and 2000. Regal Cinemas expanded and remodeled in 1999, using the third floor of the empty former Robinsons-May building to add additional theaters, resulting in today's Regal Promenade Stadium 13.

=== 2000s ===
The Avenue saw an improvement in foot traffic and business in 2002. A Borders Books and Music store opened in August of that year. Saks Fifth Avenue, the only department store anchor, closed on May 13, 2006. In November 2006, Cousins sold the mall to Stoltz Real Estate Partners of Pennsylvania for $95.7 million. Stolz polled the community for a new name for the mall in February 2008, with the winning name being The Promenade on the Peninsula, which it was renamed in March 2008. Borders went bankrupt and closed its Palos Verdes store February 2011.

=== 2020s ===
In the 2020s, the mall entered a period of change and revitalization marked by the coming additions of new dining and entertainment venues, bringing new energy to the mall through food, fun, and places for people to spend time together. As part of this transformation, the ice rink was reintroduced as LA Kings Ice PV, replacing the former Promenade Ice Chalet. SUGO Social Restaurant, a casual yet stylish restaurant featuring a thoughtfully curated menu influenced by multiple culinary traditions, opened in November 2024, adding to the mall’s evolving dining lineup. The period has also seen the opening of additional food, beverage, and entertainment spots, including Misc. Coffee, Nara Boba, ZenesisX, a high-tech VR and e-sports gaming lounge, Fika Fika Creamery, a specialty ice cream shop, and Dilly D's, a smash burger restaurant. Kickin' Kolaches, an authentic Texas-style pastry shop and other new food concepts are scheduled to open soon. The Ruby’s restaurant overlooking the ice rink closed in 2024 and was replaced by Pho Redbo, a critically acclaimed Vietnamese noodle restaurant specializing in wagyu beef. Level Up Bowl & Bistro, an upscale bowling alley and entertainment venue featuring a full-service restaurant and bar, opened in winter 2025 on the lower level beneath Regal Cinemas. Mega Looma Epic Adventure Park, a place for children and adults to have fun together, is scheduled to open in 2026.

The mall also hosts an annual Halloween trick-or-treat event, continuing a long-running Halloween tradition that was popular at the mall during the 1980s.
