= First American Financial Corporation =

American financial services company

- Type: Public company
- Traded as: NYSE: FAF; S&P 400 Component
- Industry: Financial services
- Founded: 1889; 137 years ago
- Headquarters: 1 First American Way; Santa Ana, California, USA
- Area served: United States
- Key people: Mark Seaton (CEO)
- Products: Title insurance
- Revenue: ▲US$7.1 billion (2020)
- Net income: ▼US$696.4 million (2020)
- Total assets: ▲US$12.796 billion (2020)
- Total equity: ▲US$4.9 billion (2020)
- Number of employees: 19,597 (2021)
- Website: www.firstam.com

First American Financial Corporation is an American financial services company which provides title insurance and settlement services to the real estate and mortgage industries.

The First American Family of Companies’ core business lines include title insurance and closing/settlement services; title plant management services; title and other real property records and images; valuation products and services; home warranty products; property and casualty insurance; and banking, trust and investment advisory services. With a total revenue of $5.8 billion in 2017, the company offers its products and services directly and through agents.

In June 2010, First American Financial Corporation was established when First American split its businesses to create First American Financial Corporation which provides title and settlement services to the real estate and mortgage industry, and CoreLogic, specializing in real estate information.

== Products and services ==
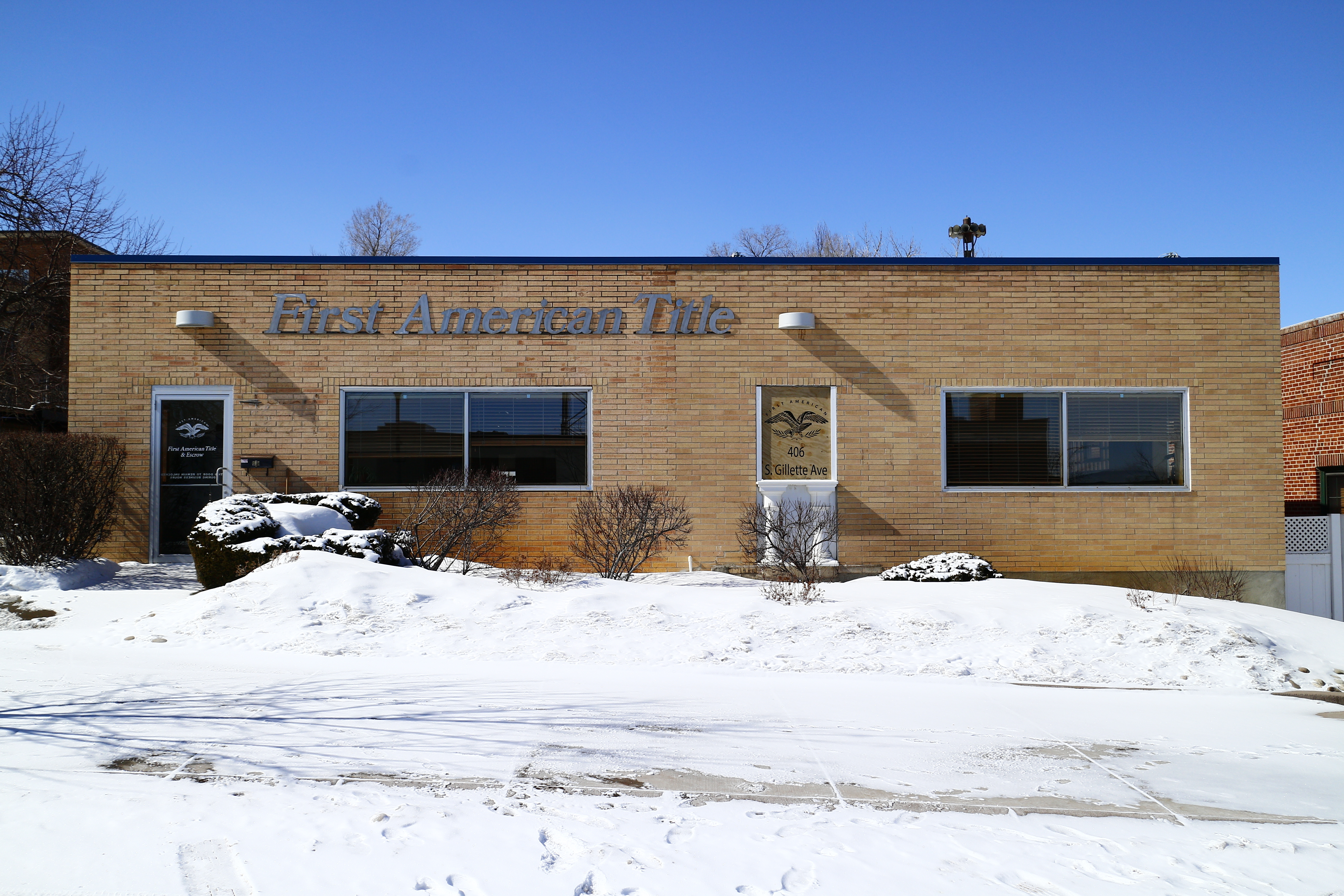
A First American Title in Gillette, Wyoming

First American serves homebuyers and sellers, real estate professionals, loan originators and services, commercial property professionals, homebuilders, and others involved in residential and commercial property transactions. First American provides title insurance and closing/settlement services; title plant management services; title and other real property records and images; real estate appraisal services; home warranty products; home insurance; and banking, trust and investment advisory services.

== History ==
=== Orange County Title Company (1889–1960) ===
First American traces its roots to 1889, when Orange County, California—a rural, undeveloped area at the time—split off from the county of Los Angeles. Two firms opened to handle title matters in the brand-new county. Five years later, Charles Edward Parker (C.E. Parker), a local businessman, succeeded in merging the two competitors into a single entity—Orange County Title Company. C.E. Parker became the president of Orange County Title, which, starting in 1909, would pay a cash dividend every year for the rest of the century and would become one of the first abstract companies in California to qualify to issue title insurance policies.

Donald Parker Kennedy (D.P. Kennedy), grandson of C.E. Parker, joined Orange County Title in 1948. D.P. Kennedy developed a plan to expand the company beyond Orange County, which was approved by the board of directors in 1957.

=== First American Title Insurance and Trust Company (1960–1968) ===
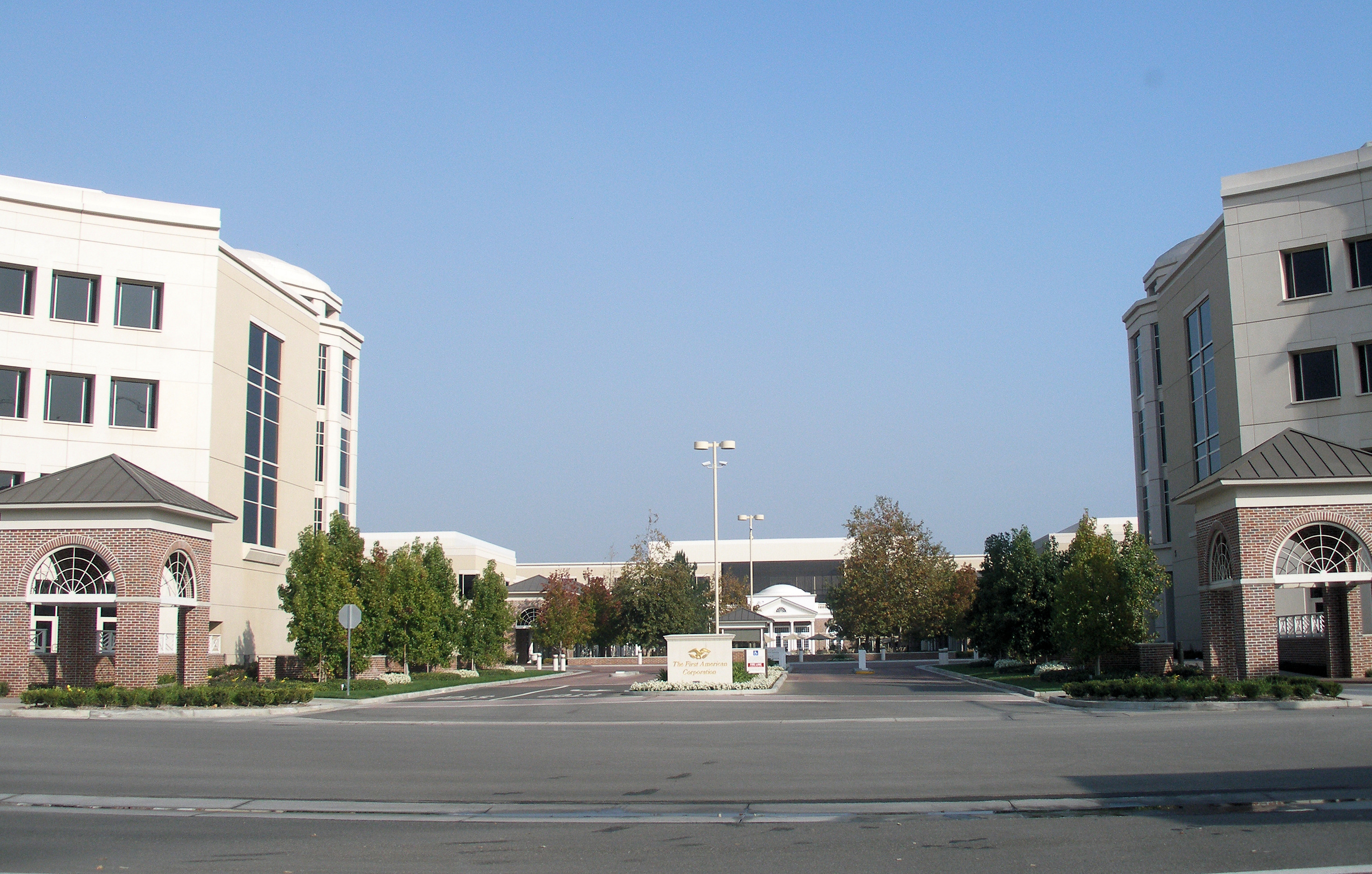
Entrance to First American Corporation headquarters complex in Santa Ana

Orange County Title was renamed First American Title Insurance in 1960 to reflect operations beyond Orange County,

D.P. Kennedy was named president of First American Title in 1963, replacing his uncle, George Parker. First American Title had its initial public offering on the over-the-counter market in 1964 and, four years later, was restructured with the formation of The First American Financial Corporation as a holding company. First American Title became a subsidiary company and a trust business was conducted through First American Trust Company.

=== The First American Financial Corporation (1968–2000) ===
First American expanded its title operations across the nation by opening new offices and acquiring existing title and abstract companies. In 1976, this growth lead to an expansion of the company's Santa Ana headquarters; by 1982, First American served all regions of the United States. In 1988, First American began to operate internationally with the opening of title insurance offices in Canada. International operations continued to expand from there onwards, and First American was the first title insurance provider in Mexico, Korea and Hong Kong, having the leading market share in Australia and England.

=== The First American Corporation (2000–2010) ===
The First American Financial Corporation was renamed The First American Corporation in May 2000 to reflect the expansion of services beyond financial services and title insurance. The First American Family of Companies grew to operate within five business segments, including: Title Insurance and Services, Specialty Insurance, Mortgage Information, Property Information, and Risk Mitigation and Business Solutions. First American had approximately 2,100 offices throughout the United States and abroad.

=== First American Financial Corporation (2010–present) ===
June 1, 2010 marked the separation of the First American Corporation's financial services operations and its information solution businesses into two independent public companies. The spin-off was intended to allow First American to focus solely on its core businesses. The title insurance and settlement services of The First American Corporation became First American Financial Corporation while the property information and analytics businesses became CoreLogic.

As part of a spin-off transaction, First American Financial Corporation common stock was distributed to shareholders of The First American Corporation on June 1, 2010. The shares of both companies traded on a “when-issued” basis from May 24, 2010 through June 1, 2010, and began full-fledged trading on the New York Stock Exchange on June 2. First American Financial Corporation traded under the ticker symbol FAF, and each shareholder received one share of First American Financial Corporation common stock for every share of The First American Corporation common stock held as of the close of business on the record date of May 26, 2010. Shareholders also received a cash payment in lieu of any fractional shares.

The company continued to be commonly referred to as First American and serves homebuyers and sellers, real estate professionals, loan originators and servicers, commercial property professionals, homebuilders, and others involved in residential and commercial property transactions with products and services specific to their businesses. Those services include title insurance and closing/settlement services; property data, and title plant records and images; home warranties; property and casualty insurance; and banking, trust, and advisory services.

In February 2020, First American announced it agreed to buy Docutech, a document, eSign and compliance technology provider, for $350 million.

In April 2025, Chief Financial Officer Mark E. Seaton was appointed Chief Executive Officer. Seaton replaced departing CEO Ken DeGiorgio. DeGiorgio was terminated "without cause" after being arrested and charged with misdemeanor assault for allegedly choking and threatening to kill a passenger on a cruise ship near San Juan, Puerto Rico. DeGiorgio's termination package totalled $18.6 million, including $7.24 million in severance, $9.14 million in accelerated vesting of equity, and $2.2 million from the company's retirement plan. In addition, Treasurer Matt F. Wajner was promoted to Chief Financial Officer and Chairman of the Board Dennis J. Gilmore moved to Executive Chairman of First American.

==== Breach ====
In May 2019, it was reported that First American Financial Corp's website had inadvertently leaked hundreds of millions of documents related to mortgage deals dating back to 2003. The exposed data included sensitive personal information such as bank account numbers, mortgage and tax records, Social Security numbers, wire transaction receipts, and driver's license images, accessible without any form of authentication to anyone with a web browser. This vulnerability was brought to the company's attention by KrebsOnSecurity after being notified by a real estate developer, who discovered that altering a single digit in the URL of a document could reveal other documents sequentially. Approximately 885 million files were potentially exposed, with the earliest document dating back over 16 years. The company responded by disabling external access to the application and initiating an internal review to evaluate the impact on customer information security.

== Subsidiaries and Sub-Brands ==
First American Financial Corporation provides services, in addition to the title insurance services, through subsidiaries and sub-brands.

Examples of sub-brands and subsidiaries:

- Datatrace
- Docutech
- First American Data & Analytics
- First American Home Warranty
- First American Title Company

== See also ==
- Title Insurance and Trust Company, Los Angeles
