= Rancho Palos Verdes, California =

- City
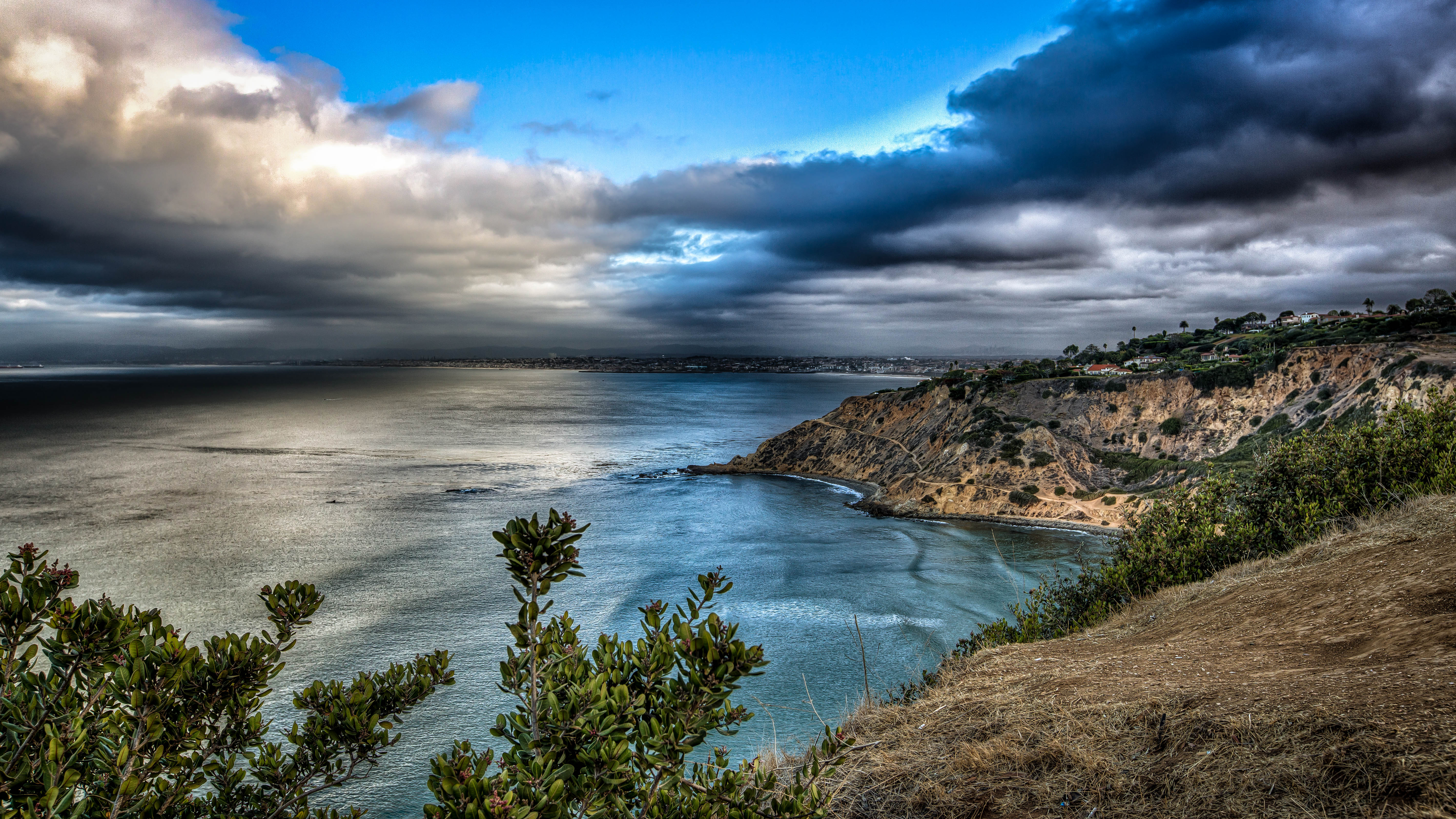
- Rancho Palos Verdes coastline

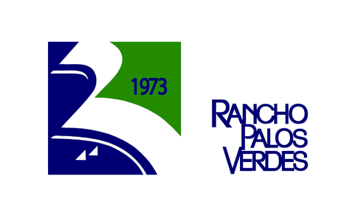
- Flag Seal
- Nicknames: RPV, PV
- Interactive map of Rancho Palos Verdes, California
- Location in the United States
- Coordinates: 33°45′30″N 118°21′51″W
- Country: United States
- State: California
- County: Los Angeles
- Incorporated: September 7, 1973
- Founder: Juan Jose Sepulveda
- Named for: "Ranch Of Green Sticks"

Government
  - Mayor: Paul Seo
  - Mayor Pro Tem: Stephen Perestam
  - City Council: David L. Bradley; Barbara Ferraro; George Lewis
  - City Manager: Ara Mihranian

Area
  - Total: 13.47 sq mi (34.89 km^{2})
  - Land: 13.47 sq mi (34.89 km^{2})
  - Water: 0 sq mi (0.00 km^{2}) 0%
- Elevation: 220 ft (67 m)

Population (2020)
  - Total: 42,287
  - Density: 3,082.8/sq mi (1,190.27/km^{2})
- Time zone: UTC-8 (Pacific)
  - Summer (DST): UTC-7 (PDT)
- ZIP code: 90275
- Area codes: 310/424
- FIPS code: 06-59514
- GNIS feature IDs: 255967, 2411516
- Website: rpvca.gov

Rancho Palos Verdes is an affluent coastal city in southern Los Angeles County, California, United States. Incorporated on September 7, 1973, the city has a population of 42,287 as reported in the 2020 United States census. The city sits atop the bluffs of the Palos Verdes Peninsula and the Palos Verdes Hills, and neighbors Palos Verdes Estates, Rolling Hills, Rolling Hills Estates, Torrance, and San Pedro. Rancho Palos Verdes is known for its nature preserve trails, its school district, and its high property values.

== History ==
By 1882, ownership of the land had passed from the Sepulveda family through various mortgage holders to Jotham Bixby of Rancho Los Cerritos, who leased the land to Japanese farmers. Japanese families farmed the most southern slopes, growing fields of beans, peas, and tomatoes in the area. Barley, hay, and grain were grown on the dryer northern slopes.

Frank Vanderlip, known as the "Father of Palos Verdes", representing a group of wealthy east coast investors, purchased 25 square miles of land on the Palos Verdes Peninsula in 1913 for $1.5 million. The Olmsted Brothers contracted Koebig & Koebig to perform engineering work, including surveying and road planning.

By 1921, Vanderlip had lost interest in overseeing development of Palos Verdes and enticed Edward Gardner Lewis to take over the project with an option to buy the property for $5 million. Lewis was an experienced developer, but lacked the capital to purchase and develop Palos Verdes. Instead, he established a real estate trust, capitalizing the project through the sale of notes which were convertible to Palos Verdes property. Under the terms of the trust, Lewis sought to raise $30 million for infrastructure improvements, effectively borrowing from investors for both the land and the improvements. He succeeded in attracting $15 million in capital, but far short of the $35 million needed. The trust dissolved and ownership of Palos Verdes reverted to Vanderlip.

In the 1970s, development along the California coastline increased significantly, with numerous condominium projects emerging in areas such as Santa Monica. On the peninsula, construction of the Palos Verdes Bay Club on the coast and other multi-unit residential complexes inland prompted local concerns. In response, residents voted to incorporate as a city and Rancho Palos Verdes was officially incorporated on September 7, 1973. Because of this history, the city has maintained significantly restrictive zoning policies when compared to other jurisdictions in California.

=== Landslide area ===
A small section of the city, the Portuguese Bend area of the Palos Verdes Peninsula has a history of landslides going back 250,000 years. The landslide spans 260 acres (1.1 km^{2}), around 4% of the total landmass of the peninsula, with an average thickness of 135 feet (41 m). The ground failure occurs on an overall smooth surface approximately 100 feet (30 m) below the surface. The ground failure over the years has been due to seaward-dipping strata, rock weakness and continual coastal erosion.

In 2023, the city received a more than $23 million grant from the Federal Emergency Management Agency (FEMA) to help mitigate the effects of the land movement in the area. Later in the year, the Rancho Palos Verdes City Council declared a local emergency due to increasing land movement following landslides.

In July 2024, So Cal Gas suspended services to 135 homes due to the severity of the land movement. On September 2, 2024, California Governor Gavin Newsom declared a state of emergency, and officials cut power to 245 homes. As of February 2025, land movement has slowed significantly, resulting in gas and electricity services being restored to a number of homes in the land movement area. The city also installed dozens of dewatering wells and drainage improvements as a long‑term stabilization project in the area.

As of May 2025, SoCalGas had begun to restore gas services to the majority of homes in the landslide area following reports that monitoring has shown no measurable movement in the land because of the city's mitigation efforts.

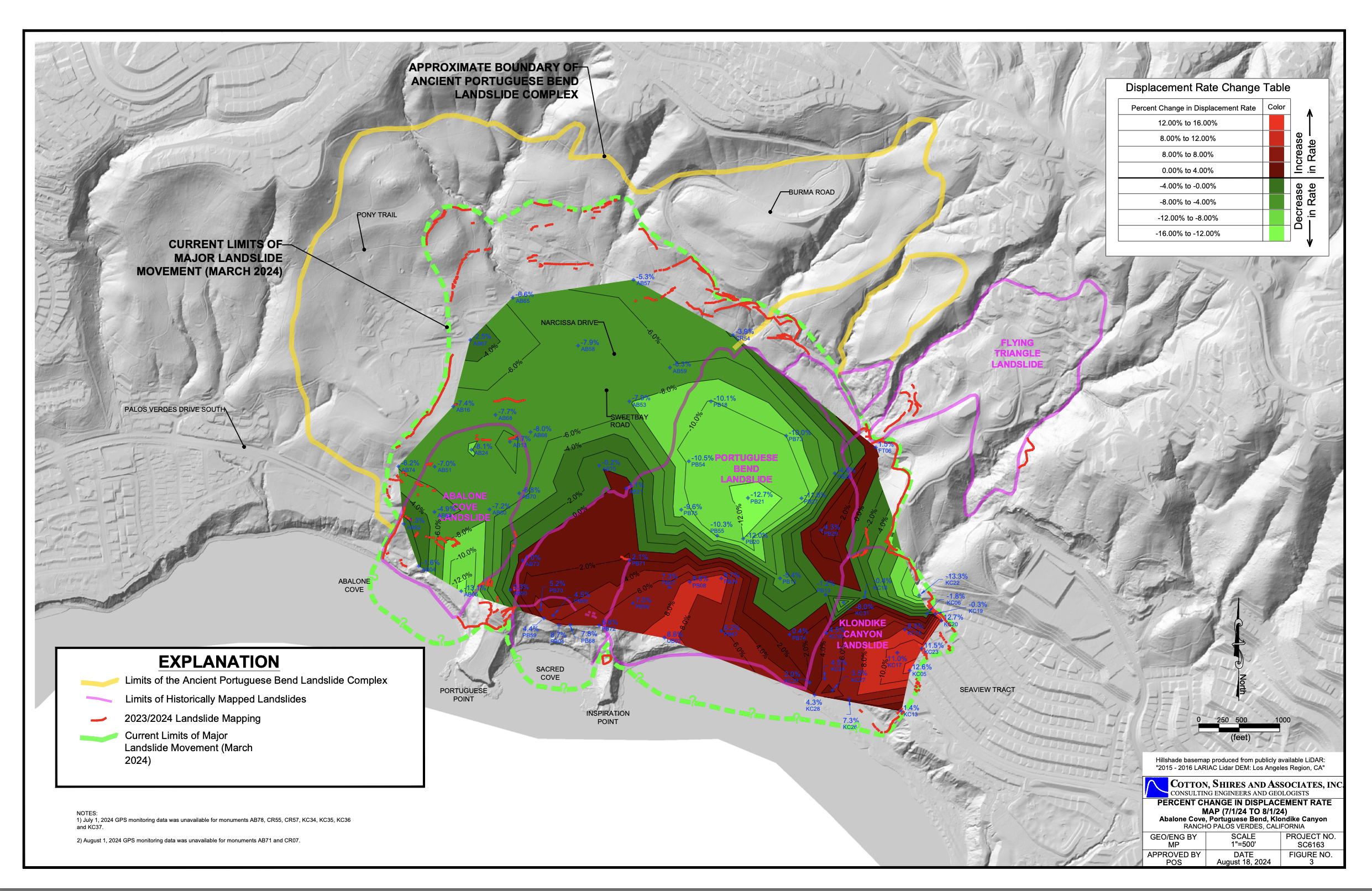
Landslide Area

== Geography ==
According to the United States Census Bureau, the city has a total area of 13.5 square miles (35 km^{2}), virtually all land.

=== Fauna ===
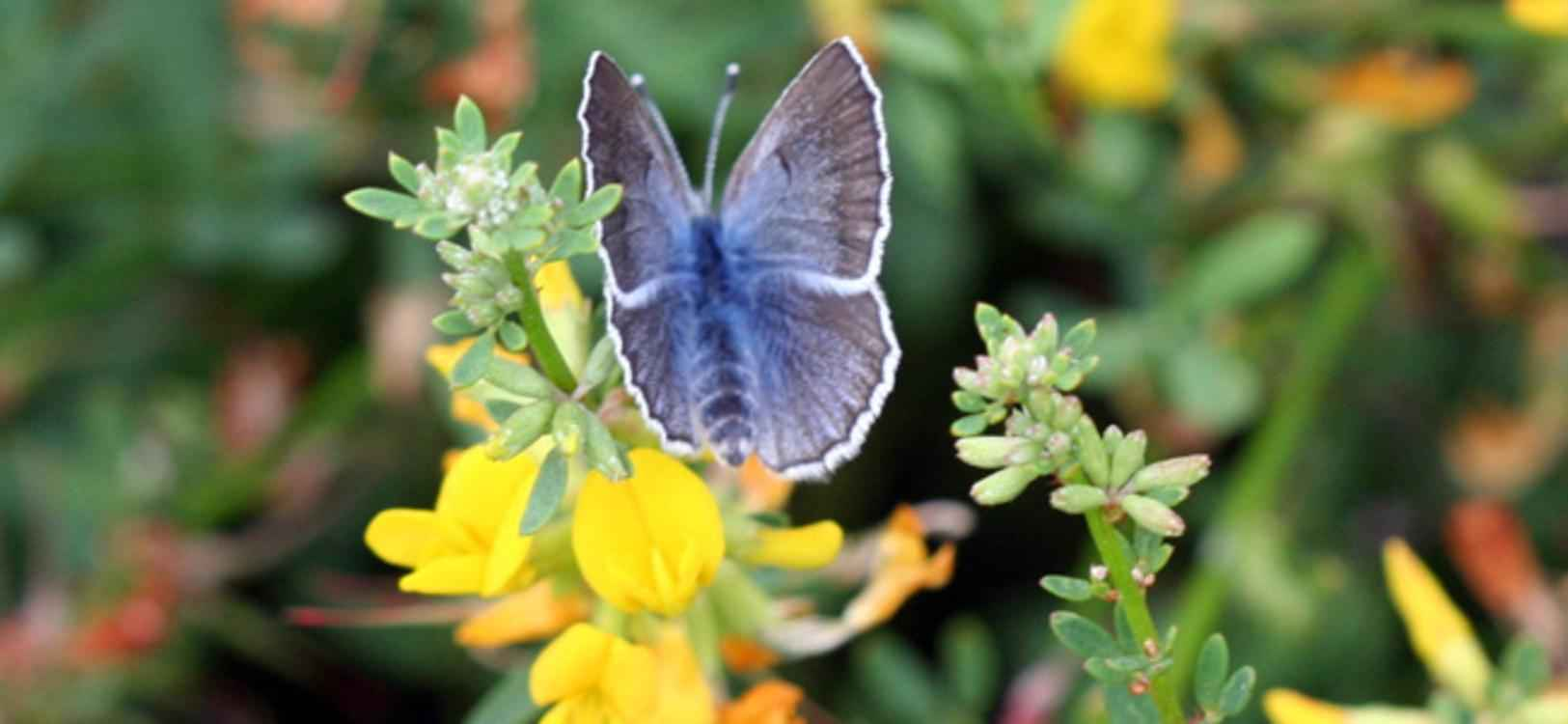
Palos Verdes Blue Butterfly

As with other cities on the Palos Verdes Peninsula, the city has had to find ways to control the population of wild peafowl. Frank A. Vanderlip spearheaded a group that bought 16,000 acres (6,500 ha) and began development of the peninsula. He is credited with introducing the birds here around 1910. The city has an abundance of peafowl.

In 1982, the city of Rancho Palos Verdes began construction at Hesse Park, which destroyed one of the largest remaining populations of endangered butterflies, the Palos Verdes blue (Glaucopsyche lygdamus palosverdesensis). This resulted in a lawsuit against the city that was ultimately dismissed for the reason that a city as a legal entity could not be held responsible.

== Demographics ==
Historical population
Census	Pop.	Note	%±
1980	36,577		—
1990	41,659		13.9%
2000	41,145		−1.2%
2010	41,643		1.2%
2020	42,287		1.5%
U.S. Decennial Census; 1850–1870 1880–1890; 1900 1910 1920; 1930 1940 1950; 1960 1970 1980; 1990 2000 2010

=== Racial and ethnic composition ===
Rancho Palos Verdes, California – Racial and Ethnic Composition Note: the US Census treats Hispanic/Latino as an ethnic category. This table excludes Latinos from the racial categories and assigns them to a separate category. Hispanics/Latinos may be of any race.
Race / Ethnicity (NH = Non-Hispanic)	Pop 1980	Pop 1990	Pop 2000	Pop 2010	Pop 2020	% 1980	% 1990	% 2000	% 2010	% 2020
White alone (NH)	30,910	30,063	25,979	23,323	20,480	84.51%	72.16%	63.14%	56.01%	48.43%
Black or African American alone (NH)	705	771	803	988	1,086	1.93%	1.85%	1.95%	2.37%	2.57%
Native American or Alaska Native alone (NH)	102	92	40	54	38	0.28%	0.22%	0.10%	0.13%	0.09%
Asian alone (NH)	3,678	8,478	10,646	11,998	13,424	10.06%	20.35%	25.87%	28.81%	31.74%
Native Hawaiian or Pacific Islander alone (NH)	3,678	8,478	36	39	32	10.06%	20.35%	0.09%	0.09%	0.08%
Other race alone (NH)	87	40	88	92	301	0.24%	0.10%	0.21%	0.22%	0.71%
Mixed race or Multiracial (NH)	x	x	1,214	1,593	2,391	x	x	2.95%	3.83%	5.65%
Hispanic or Latino (any race)	1,095	2,215	2,339	3,556	4,535	2.99%	5.32%	5.68%	8.54%	10.72%
Total	36,577	41,659	41,145	41,643	42,287	100.00%	100.00%	100.00%	100.00%	100.00%

=== 2020 census ===
As of the 2020 census, Rancho Palos Verdes had a population of 42,287. The median age was 50.0 years. 19.7% of residents were under the age of 18 and 26.0% of residents were 65 years of age or older. For every 100 females there were 93.3 males, and for every 100 females age 18 and over there were 90.1 males age 18 and over.

100.0% of residents lived in urban areas, while 0.0% lived in rural areas.

There were 15,765 households in Rancho Palos Verdes, of which 30.8% had children under the age of 18 living in them. Of all households, 64.1% were married-couple households, 11.6% were households with a male householder and no spouse or partner present, and 21.8% were households with a female householder and no spouse or partner present. About 19.9% of all households were made up of individuals and 13.4% had someone living alone who was 65 years of age or older.

There were 16,497 housing units, of which 4.4% were vacant. The homeowner vacancy rate was 0.8% and the rental vacancy rate was 5.2%.

Historically, Rancho Palos Verdes has been majority White, though the non-Hispanic White share declined between 2000 and 2020 while Asian, multiracial, and Hispanic or Latino shares increased.

=== 2010 census ===
The 2010 United States census reported that Rancho Palos Verdes had a population of 41,643. The population density was 3,092.6 inhabitants per square mile (1,194.1/km^{2}). The racial makeup of Rancho Palos Verdes was 25,698 (61.7%) White (56.0% Non-Hispanic White), 1,015 (2.4%) African American, 80 (0.2%) Native American, 12,077 (29.0%) Asian, 41 (0.1%) Pacific Islander, 748 (1.8%) from other races, and 1,984 (4.8%) from two or more races. Hispanic or Latino of any race were 3,556 persons (8.5%).

The census reported that 41,303 people (99.2% of the population) lived in households, 313 (0.8%) lived in non-institutionalized group quarters, and 27 (0.1%) were institutionalized.

There were 15,561 households, of which 5,187 (33.3%) had children under the age of 18 living in them, 10,465 (67.3%) were opposite-sex married couples living together, 1,218 (7.8%) had a female householder with no husband present, and 460 (3.0%) had a male householder with no wife present. There were 304 (2.0%) unmarried opposite-sex partnerships and 85 (0.5%) same-sex married couples or partnerships. 2,936 households (18.9%) were made up of individuals, and 1,810 (11.6%) had someone living alone who was 65 years of age or older. The average household size was 2.65. There were 12,143 families (78.0% of all households); the average family size was 3.03.

The population was diverse in age terms, with 9,248 people (22.2%) under the age of 18, 2,352 people (5.6%) aged 18 to 24, 7,045 people (16.9%) aged 25 to 44, 13,344 people (32.0%) aged 45 to 64, and 9,654 people (23.2%) aged 65 or older. The median age was 47.8 years. For every 100 females, there were 94.3 males. For every 100 females aged 18 and over, there were 90.1 males.

There were 16,179 housing units, at an average density of 1,201.5 units per square mile (463.9 units/km^{2}), of which 12,485 (80.2%) were owner occupied and 3,076 (19.8%) were occupied by renters. The homeowner vacancy rate was 0.6%; the rental vacancy rate was 6.4%. 33,015 people (79.3% of the population) lived in owner-occupied housing units, and 8,288 people (19.9%) lived in rental housing units.

According to the 2010 United States census, Rancho Palos Verdes had a median household income of $118,893, with 4.5% of the population living below the federal poverty line.

== Economy ==
=== Top employers ===
According to the city's 2024 Comprehensive Annual Financial Report, the top employers in the city were:

#	Employer	Employees
1	Palos Verdes Peninsula Unified School District	1,425
2	Terranea Resort	638
3	Salvation Army	263
4	UCLA South Bay Campus	215
5	The Canterbury Retirement Community	164
6	Belmont Corp LTD of Belmont Village	161
7	Trump National Golf Club, Los Angeles	94
8	Ralphs	88
9	City of Rancho Palos Verdes	86
10	Los Verdes Golf Course	-
11	Keller Williams Realty	-
12	Trader Joe's	-

== Arts and culture ==
=== Library ===
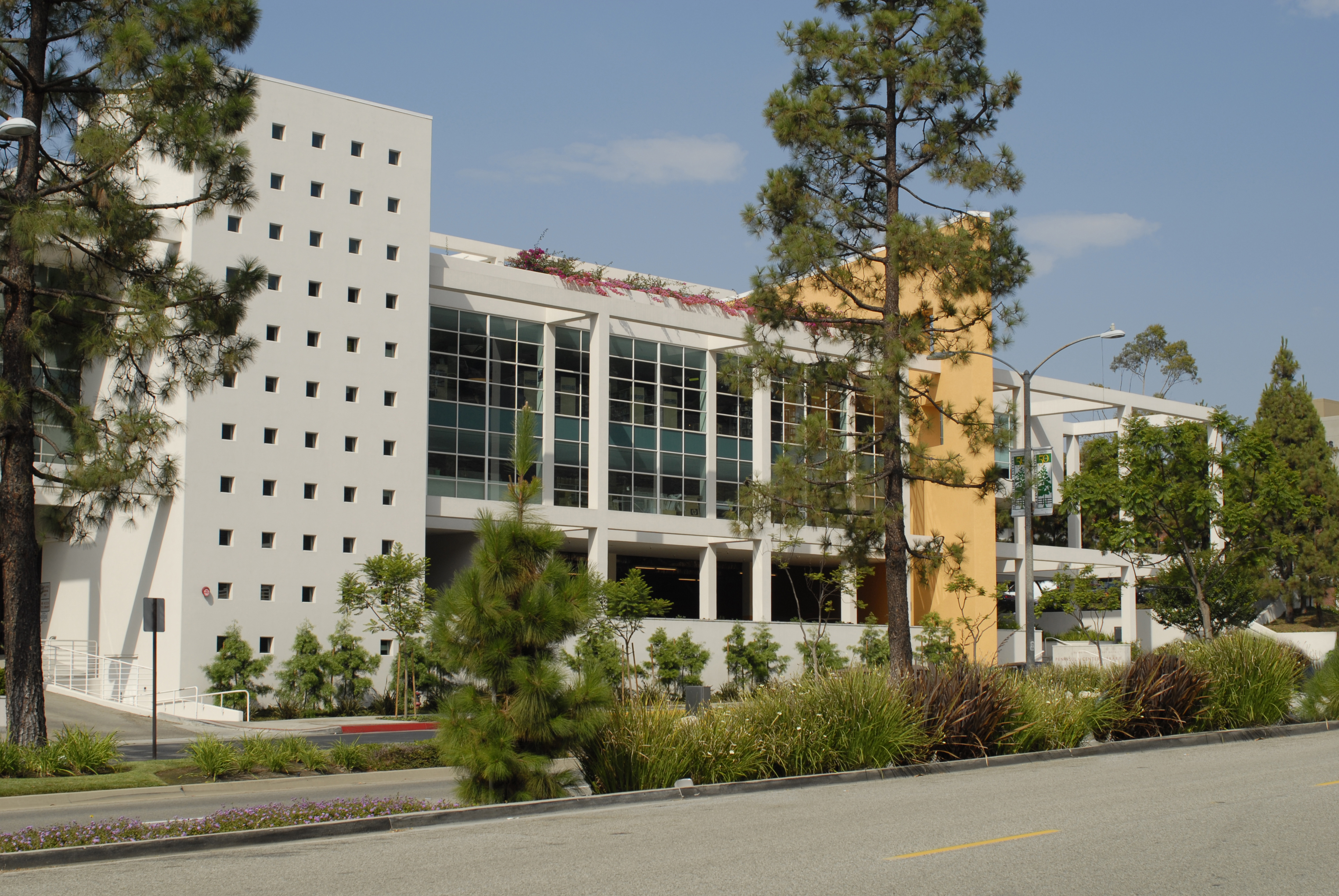
Main Library in Rolling Hills Estates

The Palos Verdes Library District operates three libraries on the Palos Verdes Peninsula.

=== Landmarks ===
==== Point Vicente Lighthouse ====
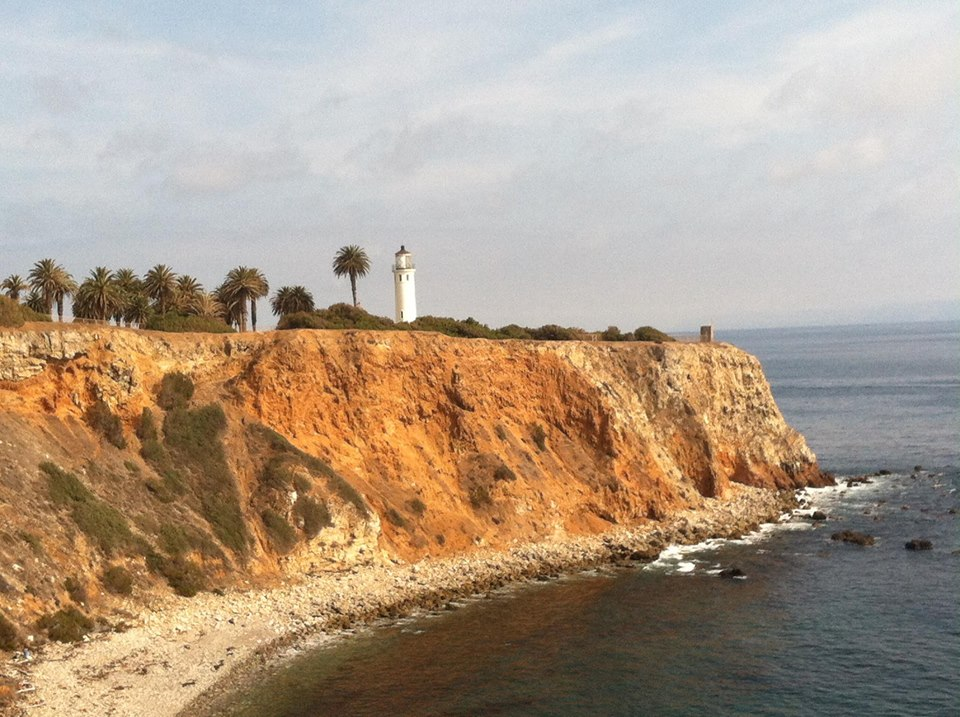
Point Vicente Lighthouse

The Point Vicente Lighthouse, built in 1926, is listed on the National Register of Historic Places. It is 67 feet (20 m) tall and stands on a cliff with a height of 130 feet (40 m). It is between Point Loma Lighthouse to the south and Point Conception Lighthouse to the north.

==== Wayfarers Chapel ====
Wayfarers Chapel

Wayfarers Chapel, listed on the National Register of Historic Places, was designed by Lloyd Wright, and built between 1949 and 1951. It is noted for its organic architecture and location on cliffs above the Pacific Ocean. It is part of the Swedenborgian Church of North America and serves as a memorial to the 18th century scientist and theosopher, Emanuel Swedenborg. Wayfarers Chapel announced a temporary closure "due to the accelerated land movement in our local area" in February 2024. As of May 2024, the firm Architectural Resources Group, with input from the National Park Service and at a cost of $20 million, will be dismantling the chapel for placement in storage. As of 2025, the city is working to gain ownership of a parcel of land on the very tip of the Palos Verdes East Peninsula, only a mile and a half away from the original location. The location, currently owned by the federal government, was once used by the military to defend the coast during World War II. Once it's transferred to the city of Rancho Palace Verdes, the Chapel will be rebuilt on this four-acre site.

== Parks and recreation ==
=== Portuguese Bend and Palos Verdes Nature Preserve ===
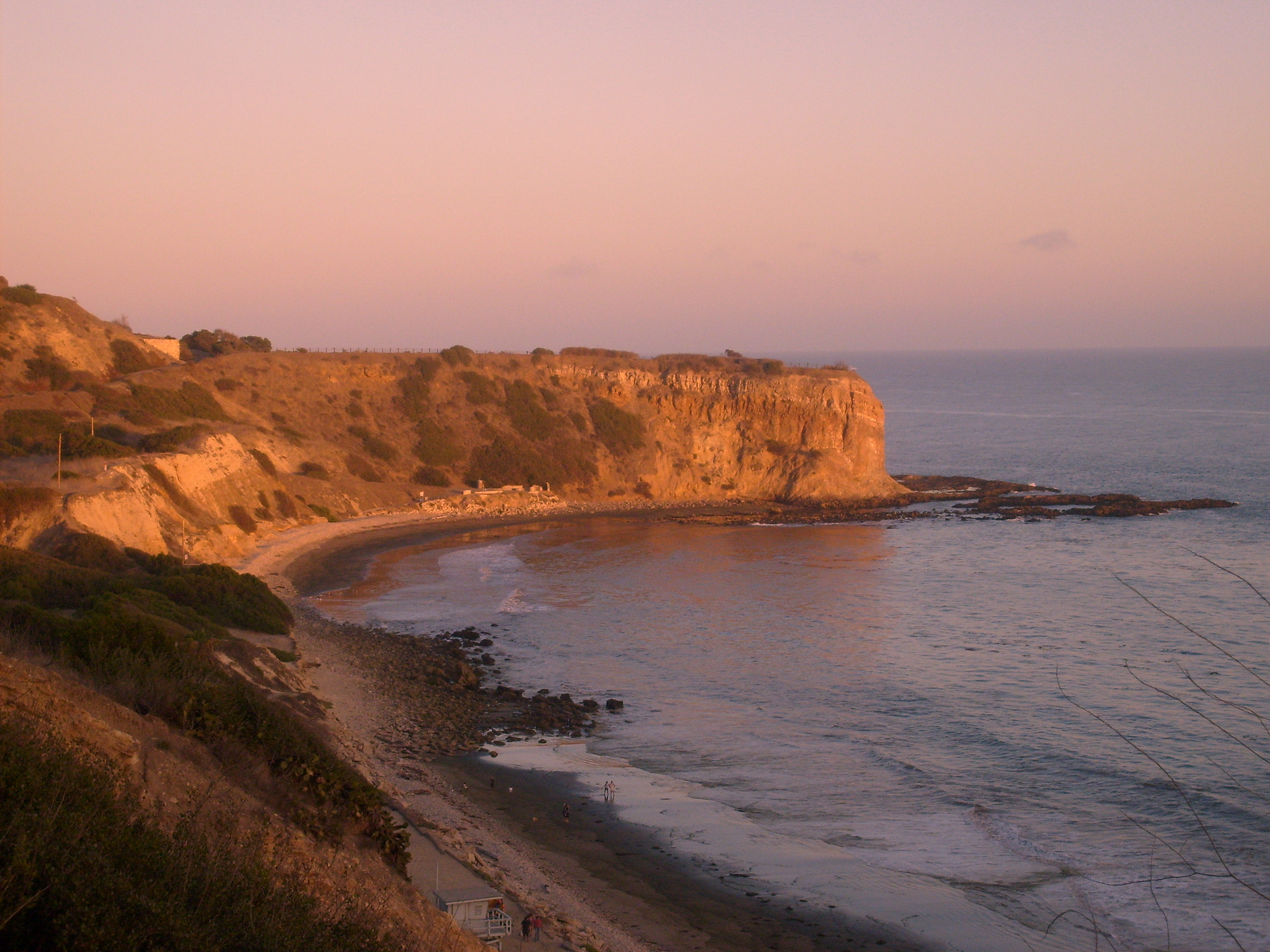
Portuguese Bend

The Portuguese Bend region is the largest area of natural vegetation remaining on the Palos Verdes Peninsula. The Portuguese Bend landslide is a continuously moving landslide located along the southern coastal part of Rancho Palos Verdes. In 2009, the city of Rancho Palos Verdes, and the Palos Verdes Peninsula Land Conservancy, acquired 2 square miles (5.2 km^{2}) of this region to create the Palos Verdes Nature Preserve, the largest preserve of coastal open space north of San Diego and south of Santa Barbara.

=== Terranea Resort ===
The site of the former Marineland of the Pacific (1954–87) was redeveloped in 1998 and is now occupied by the Terranea Resort.

=== Trump National Golf Club ===
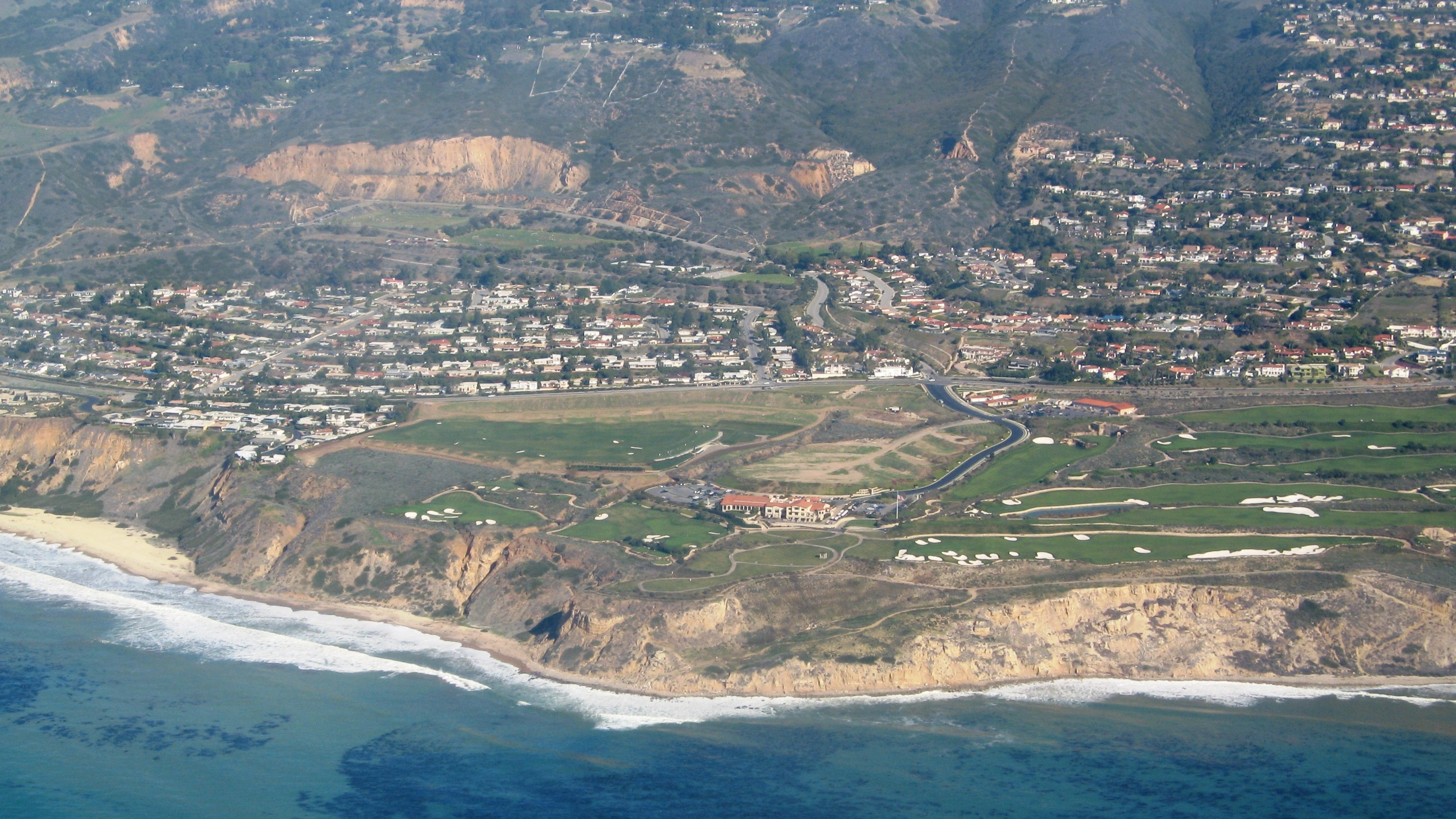
Trump National Golf Club

Trump National Golf Club Los Angeles is a public golf club in Rancho Palos Verdes. The course was designed by Pete Dye and Donald J. Trump Signature Design. It is owned by The Trump Organization. Originally owned by the Ocean Trails Golf Club, the area suffered a landslide where the 18th hole slid toward the Pacific Ocean. The Ocean Trails Golf Club subsequently went into bankruptcy, and on November 26, 2002, The Trump Organization bought the property for $27 million, with the intention of completely redesigning and rebuilding the course. In 2006, the 18-hole Trump National Golf Club opened, and erected a 70-foot flagpole for an American flag; critics claimed it was illegal, but the golf club was allowed to retain it after a City Council vote.

== Government ==
Rancho Palos Verdes is a General Law city, meaning that it has no charter. Voters elects five council members at large to four-year terms in staggered, non-partisan elections on the first Tuesday in November of every odd-numbered year. The mayor and mayor pro tempore are elected annually by the residing city council members. As of 2025, the mayor is David L. Bradley.

As outlined in the city's Municipal Code, the city council hires a city manager to manage the day-to-day operation of the city and its staff. As of 2026 the city manager is Ara Mihranian, who was appointed to the position in 2020.

=== County, state, and federal representation ===
In the County of Los Angeles, Rancho Palos Verdes is located in the 4th Supervisorial District, represented by Janice Hahn.

In the California State Legislature, Rancho Palos Verdes is in the 24th senatorial district, represented by Democrat Ben Allen, and in the 66th Assembly district, represented by Democrat Al Muratsuchi.

In the United States House of Representatives, Rancho Palos Verdes is in California's 36th congressional district, represented by Democrat Ted Lieu.

== Education ==
Most of the city is served by the Palos Verdes Peninsula Unified School District (PVPUSD), which includes Palos Verdes Peninsula High School and Palos Verdes High School.

A portion of the district is within the Los Angeles Unified School District (LAUSD, in the Eastview area of the city). Children living in the Eastview neighborhood have the option of attending public school in either the PVPUSD or the LAUSD. In 1992 84.5% of relevant voters voted approved Proposition Z to move the LAUSD portion to PVPUSD but Stephen E. O'Neil, a judge of the Los Angeles Superior Court, blocked the transfer.

Rolling Hills Country Day School (K-8) and Chadwick School (K-12) are private schools that serve the region.

Marymount California University, a private liberal arts institution, offered bachelor's and master's degrees until it closed in August 2022. Marymount has since been replaced by UCLA South Bay, which is part of the University of California system. The University of California system purchased the campus for $80 million towards the end of 2022.

The Salvation Army Territorial Headquarters as well as their department for officer training is a two-year college located on the former Marymount College Hawthorne Campus built in 1960 in Rancho Palos Verdes. It is also the administrative unit of The Salvation Army that serves the thirteen Western United States, the Marshall Islands, the Federated States of Micronesia and Guam.

== Media ==
Because of its scenic location and proximity to the Pacific Ocean and Hollywood, Rancho Palos Verdes has been the site of numerous films and television shows.

=== Films ===
Inception, It's A Mad Mad Mad Mad World, Pirates of the Caribbean, Dunkirk, 50 First Dates, Step Brothers, Horrible Bosses 2, Twins, Charlie's Angels: Full Throttle, Patriot Games, and the Lethal Weapon franchise were filmed in Rancho Palos Verdes.

=== Television ===
Many television shows, such as Emergency!, The O.C., Lucifer, Lethal Weapon, True Detective, and Beverly Hills 90210, have been filmed on location in Rancho Palos Verdes.

== Infrastructure ==
=== Emergency services ===
Fire protection in Rancho Palos Verdes is provided by the Los Angeles County Fire Department, and ambulance transport by McCormick Ambulance Service.

Rancho Palos Verdes contracts with the Los Angeles County Sheriff's Department for law enforcement services through a joint regional law enforcement agreement with the cities of Rolling Hills and Rolling Hills Estates. The Lomita Sheriff's Station serves the Peninsula Region Cities, as well as the City of Lomita and the unincorporated areas of Academy Hill and Westfield.

The Los Angeles County Department of Health Services operates the Torrance Health Center in Harbor Gateway, Los Angeles, near Torrance and serves Rancho Palos Verdes as well.

== Notable people ==
Notable people of Rancho Palos Verdes include Merrill Moses, the Olympic water polo player, who lived there. Major League Baseball pitcher Eli Morgan was born and grew up there. World number one tennis player Pete Sampras grew up there from 7 years old. Top-10 tennis player Eliot Teltscher also lived there, and top-10 tennis player Taylor Fritz lives there. Professional basketball player Shawn Weinstein is from there. Christen Press, a forward for the United States women's national soccer team and two-time World Cup champion, grew up there. Professional poker player Barry Greenstein and artist John Van Hamersveld have resided in Rancho Palos Verdes. Architect Samuel Lunden lived, died, and was buried in Rancho Palos Verdes.

Christopher John Boyce, a former American defense industry employee who was convicted for selling United States spy satellite secrets to the Soviet Union in the 1970s, grew up there. Author Joan Didion lived in the Portuguese Bend Club area of Rancho Palos Verdes for a brief period with her husband John Gregory Dunne and their daughter. Chris Doughty, Massachusetts politician and businessman, was born and raised in Palos Verdes, and was eliminated in the primary for the 2022 Gubernatorial race for the Republican Party.
