= Peninsula Shopping Center =

Shopping center in Rolling Hills Estates, California, United States

- Coordinates: 33.7747403°N 118.3764286°W
- Address: 67 Peninsula Center, Rolling Hills Estates, CA 90274
- Opened: May 1961
- Developer: Jerry Moss
- Owner: Vestar

The Peninsula Shopping Center is a shopping center in Rolling Hills Estates, California on the affluent Palos Verdes Peninsula in Greater Los Angeles.

== History ==
Developer Jerry Moss and it opened in phases from May 1961 through to 1965.

Tenants during the opening years included a 52,000-square-foot (4,800 m^{2}) J. J. Newberry variety store (May 1961, Lucky Supermarkets (October 1962), Fox Theater and Buffums department store (1963), the first major department store to open on the Palos Verdes Peninsula. By 1965 the center had 65 stores and 200,000 square feet (19,000 m^{2}) of gross leasable area. Peninsula Center hosted the Miss Peninsula Center beauty contest on May 22, 1965. In late June 1965, Peninsula Raceways opened near Buffums, in response to the slot car racing craze that reached its zenith that year.

=== Renovations ===
A $5 million renovation was approved in August 1986. A $2 million renovation took place in 2002.

=== Decline ===
During the 1980s, competition from the nearby Promenade on the Peninsula enclosed mall, which has had myriad names over the years, reduced business at the Peninsula Center and stores began to leave, while its department store anchor Buffums, closed along with the entire Buffums chain in 1991. By that year the now 30-year-old center's occupancy rate had dropped to 75%. A major tenant at that time was T. J. Maxx discount store.

=== Current status ===
The center remains but without a department store anchor the result is that of a retail power center. Current tenants are T. J. Maxx, Pavilions supermarket, Ulta Beauty and Petco.

== Ownership ==
Moss sold the property to San Francisco real estate investment trust operators Sierra Capital Co. in July 1985 for $20.5 million. Phoenix-based real estate development company Vestar bought the center in March 2013.
