= Bullocks Wilshire =

- U.S. National Register of Historic Places
- Los Angeles Historic-Cultural Monument
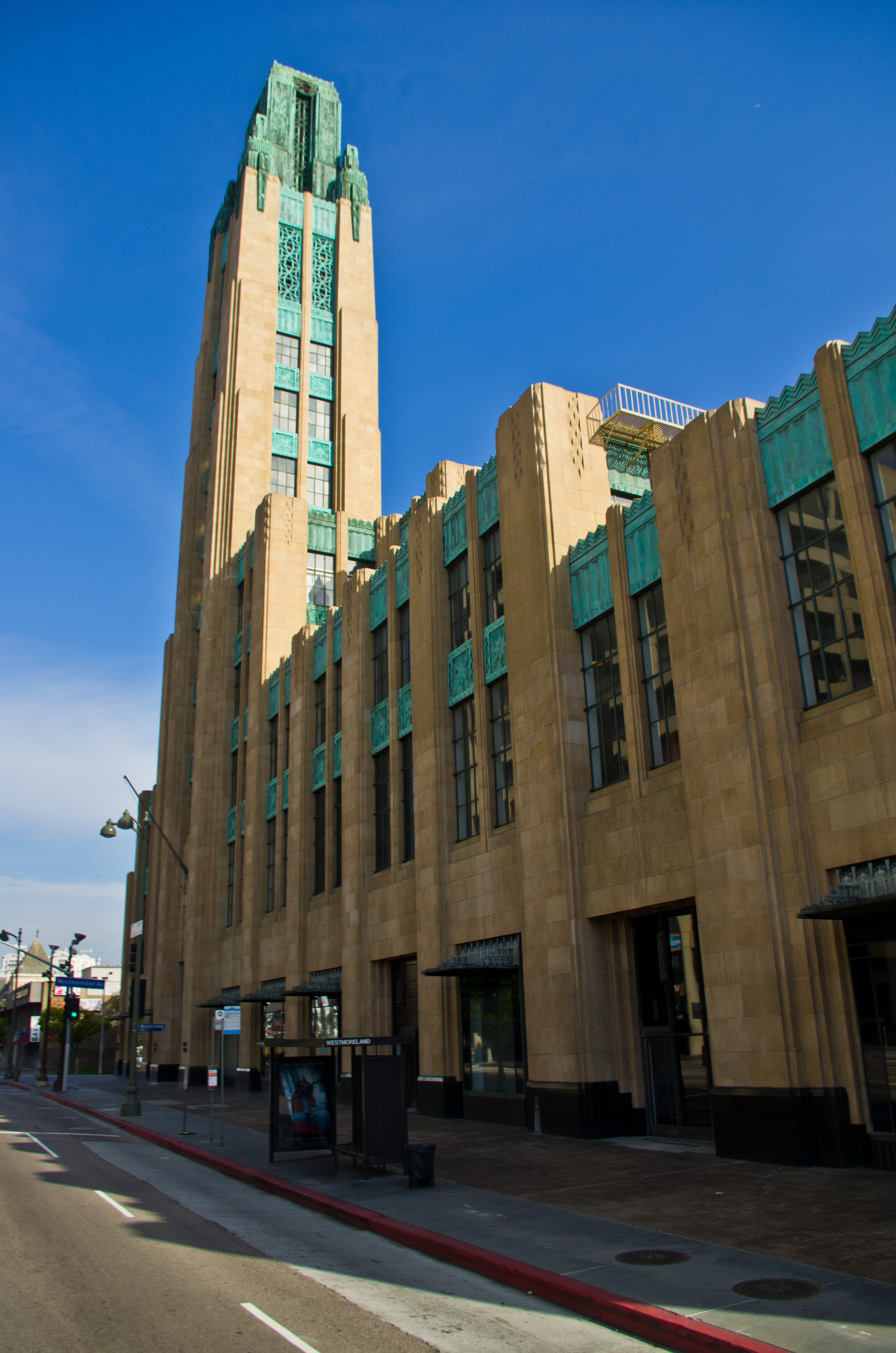
- Bullocks Wilshire looking east
- Location: 3050 Wilshire Blvd; Los Angeles, California, United States
- Coordinates: 34.06161°N 118.28827°W
- Built: 1929
- Architect: John and Donald Parkinson
- Architectural style: Art Deco
- NRHP reference No.: 78000685
- LAHCM No.: 56

Significant dates
- Added to NRHP: May 25, 1978
- Designated LAHCM: 1968-06-15

Bullocks Wilshire, located at 3050 Wilshire Boulevard in Los Angeles, California, is a 230,000-square-foot (21,000 m^{2}) Art Deco building. The building opened in September 1929 as a luxury department store for owner John G. Bullock (owner of the more mainstream Bullock's in Downtown Los Angeles). Bullocks Wilshire was also the name of the department store chain of which the Los Angeles store was the flagship; it had seven stores total; Macy's incorporated them into and rebranded them as I. Magnin in 1989, before closing I. Magnin entirely in 1994. The building is currently owned by Southwestern Law School.

== History ==
=== Design ===
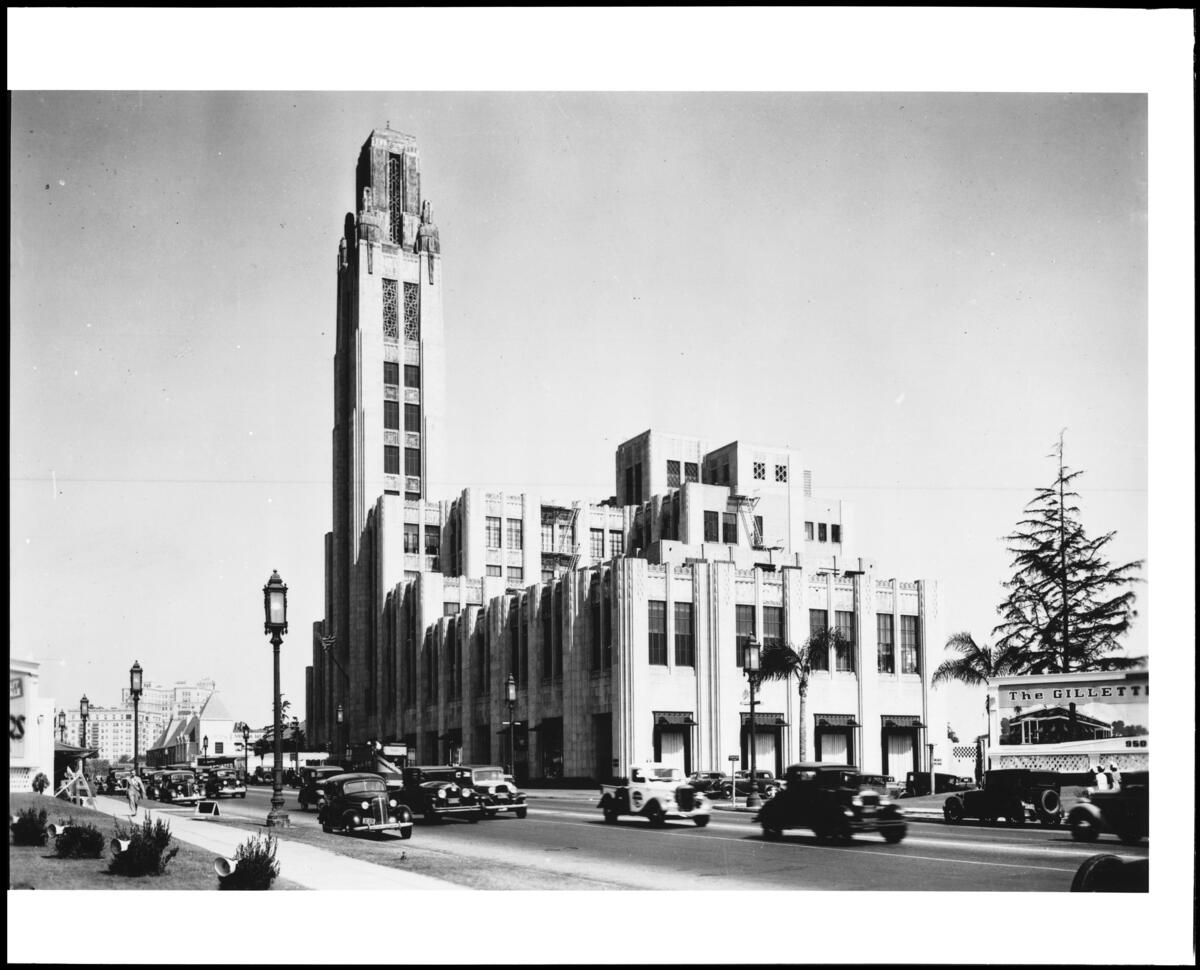
Bullocks Wilshire, c. 1936

The building was designed by Los Angeles architects John and Donald Parkinson; the interior design was by Eleanor Lemaire and Jock Peters of the Feil & Paradise Company; the ceiling mural of the porte-cochère was painted by Herman Sachs.

==== Exterior ====
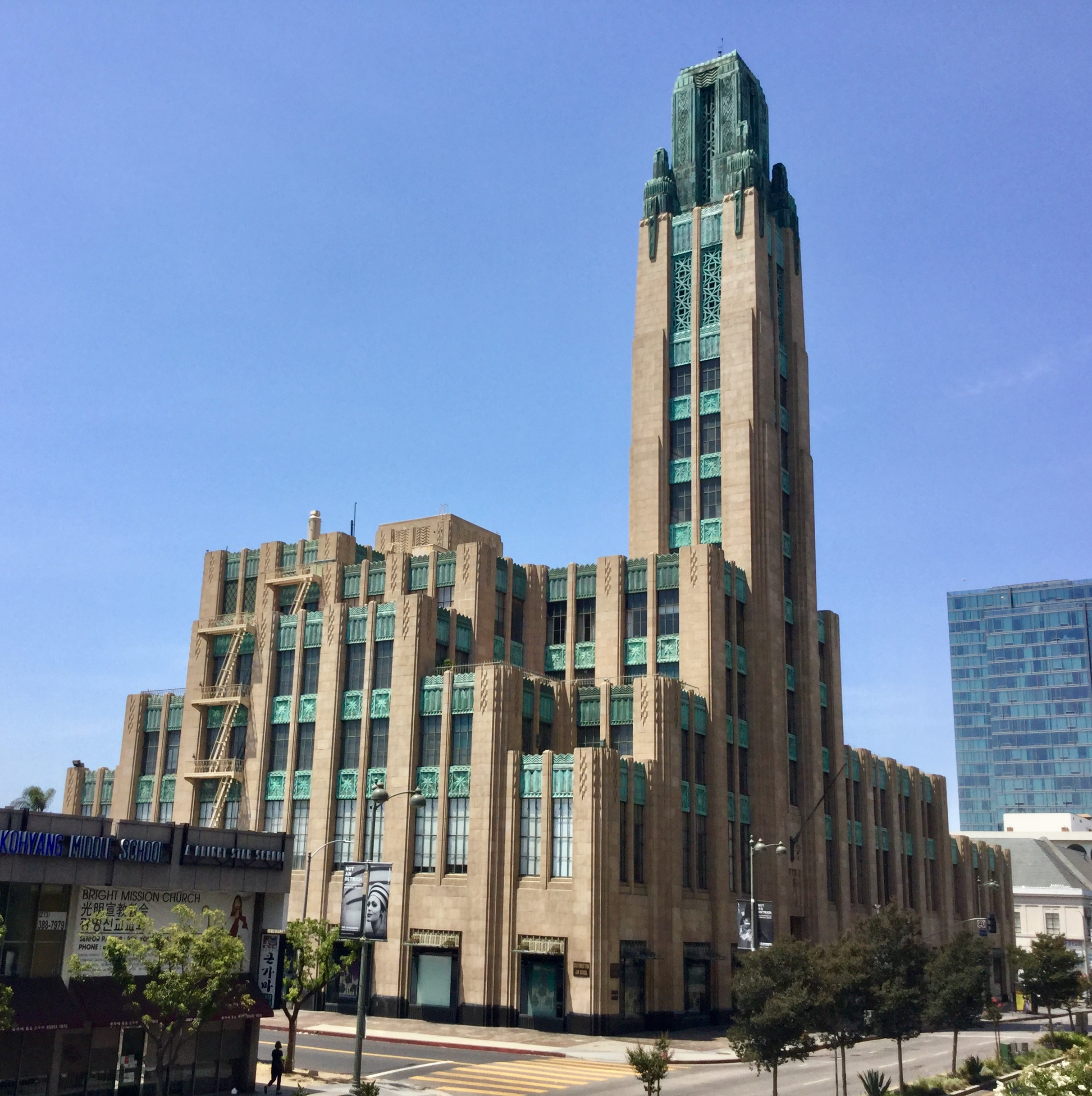
Bullocks Wilshire from the northeast.

The exterior is notable for its 241-foot (73 m) tower whose top is sheathed in copper, tarnished green. At one time, the tower peak had a light that could be seen for miles around. The stylized relief, above the Wilshire Boulevard entrance, was designed by George Stanley, designer of the Oscar. Among the workers laboring on the project may have been Sam Rodia, builder of the Watts Towers.

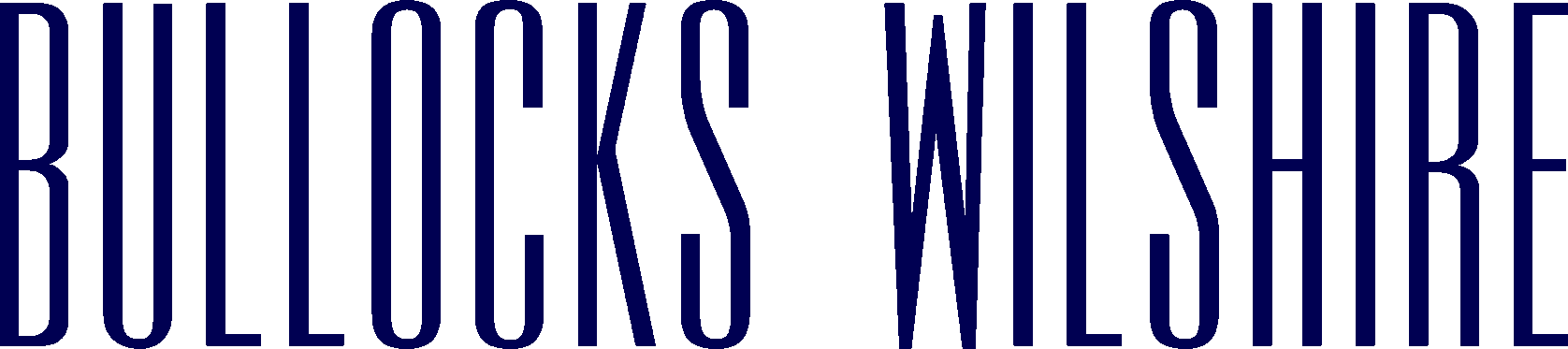
Bullocks Wilshire Logo

Bullocks Wilshire's innovation was that it was one of the first department stores in Los Angeles to cater to the burgeoning automobile culture. It was located in a then-mostly residential district, its objective to attract shoppers who wanted a closer place to shop than Downtown Los Angeles. Traditional display windows faced the sidewalk, but they were decorated to catch the eyes of motorists. Since most customers would arrive by vehicle, the most appealing entrance was placed in the rear. Under the city's first department store porte cochere, valets in livery welcomed patrons and parked their cars.

==== Interior ====
Shoppers entered the foyer which had travertine floors and elevators finished in nickel, brass, and gunmetal.

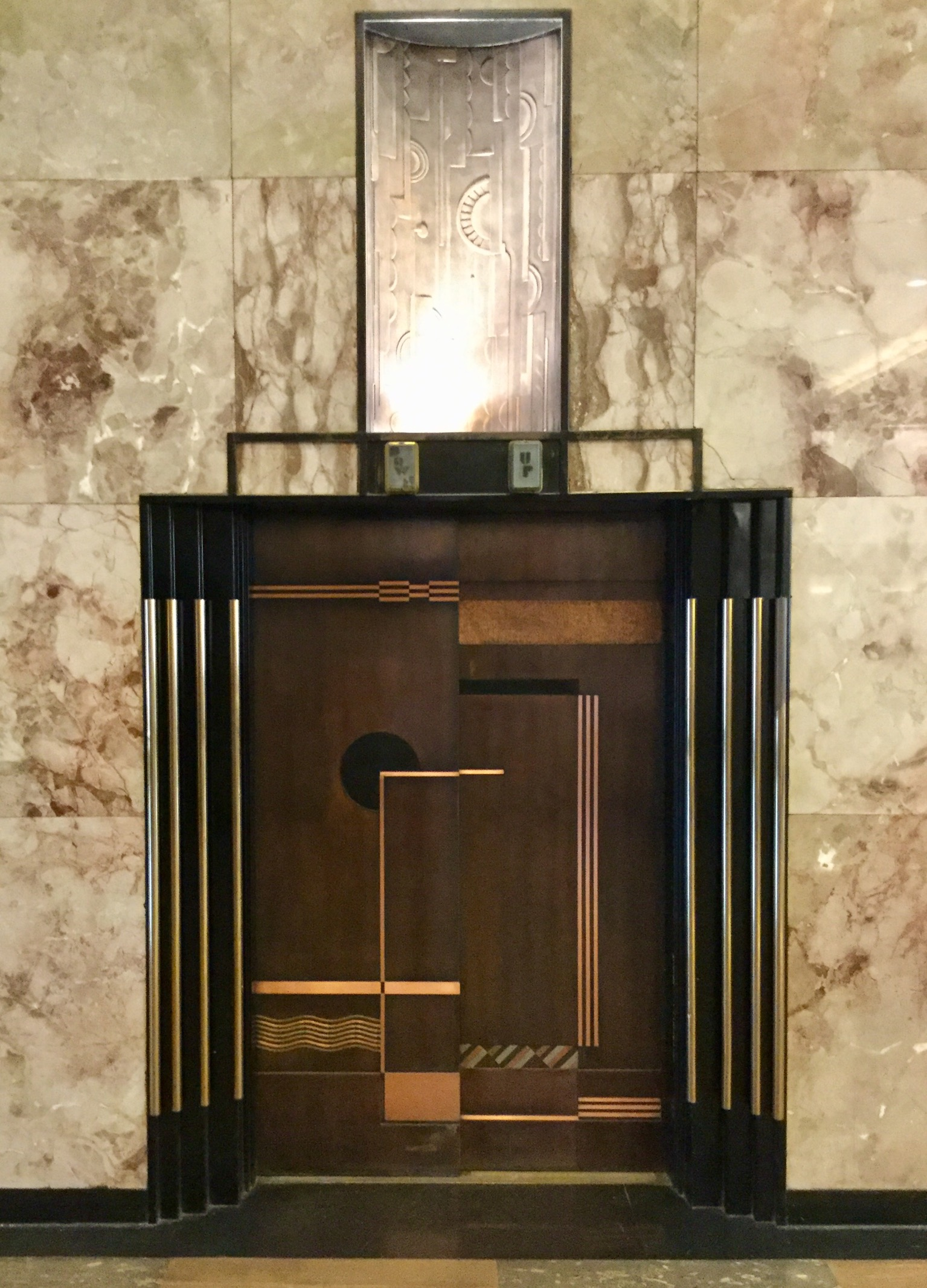
Lobby elevator door

On the first floor was the vaulted Perfume Hall, awash in natural light muted by walls of St. Genevieve marble. Other floors displayed clothes and accessories in low glass cases on rosewood stands or on live mannequins, to prevent hanging racks from cluttering sight lines. Upstairs showrooms and salons functioned almost as discrete boutiques. The Louis XVI Room sold designer dresses, the Directoire formal wear and later furs. Later still came the couture Chanel Room and the Irene Salon, enclave of future Hollywood costume designer Irene Lentz, reputed to be the first boutique devoted to a single designer inside a major U.S. department store. Lentz designed custom wardrobe for celebrities, leading to a career in design at major film studios, including MGM. Other departments included toys, a mezzanine Doggery for canine accessories, and the city's first leisurewear merchandise on the Playdeck. The women's shoe salon was paneled with the wood from a single Central American tree. Cork in exotic shades lined the walls in the furs atelier. The Saddle Shop featured vermillion floor tiles, wall cases of deep red oak, and a life-size plaster likeness of a horse, Bullock's Barney.

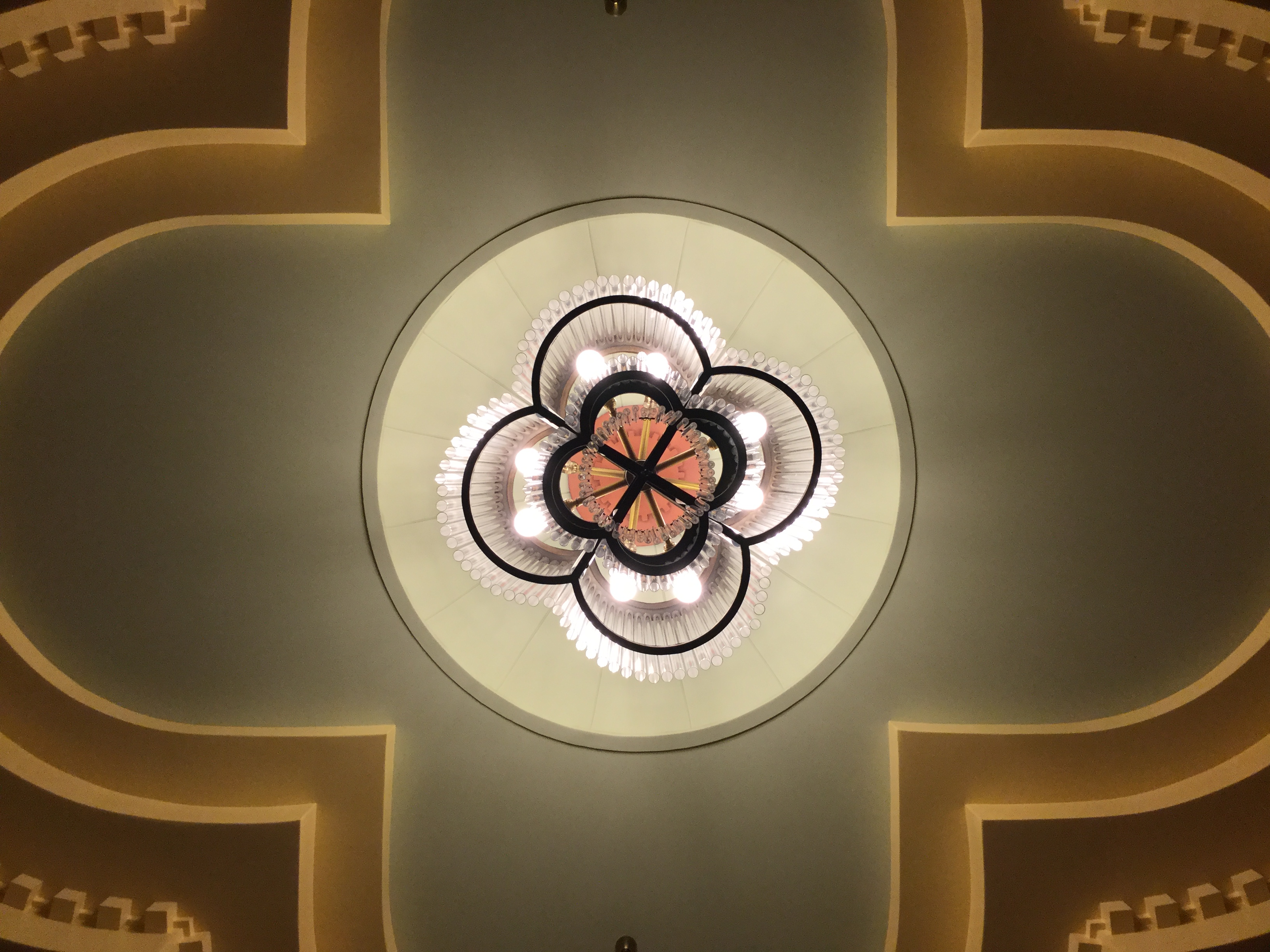
Recessed ceiling and light fixture

For refreshment, there was a top-floor desert-themed tearoom and the adjoining lounge where society women gathered for luncheon fashion shows. Truly elite service was reserved for the selected men invited to shop in the privacy of J.G. Bullock's wood-paneled private suite on the fifth floor. Titans of business and politics relaxed over cocktails and hors d'oeuvres as sales associates modeled potential gifts.

=== Clientele and notable employees ===
The department store served the upper crust of Los Angeles society. In its heyday, Bullocks Wilshire patrons included celebrities Mae West, John Wayne, Marlene Dietrich, Joan Crawford, Alfred Hitchcock, Greta Garbo, ZaSu Pitts, Walt Disney, and Clark Gable. While struggling to become an actress, a teen-aged Angela Lansbury worked as a sales clerk. Future First Lady Patricia Nixon also served a stint on the floor. From his studio, next to the Chanel department, Neil Gittings photographed many celebrities who frequented Bullocks Wilshire.

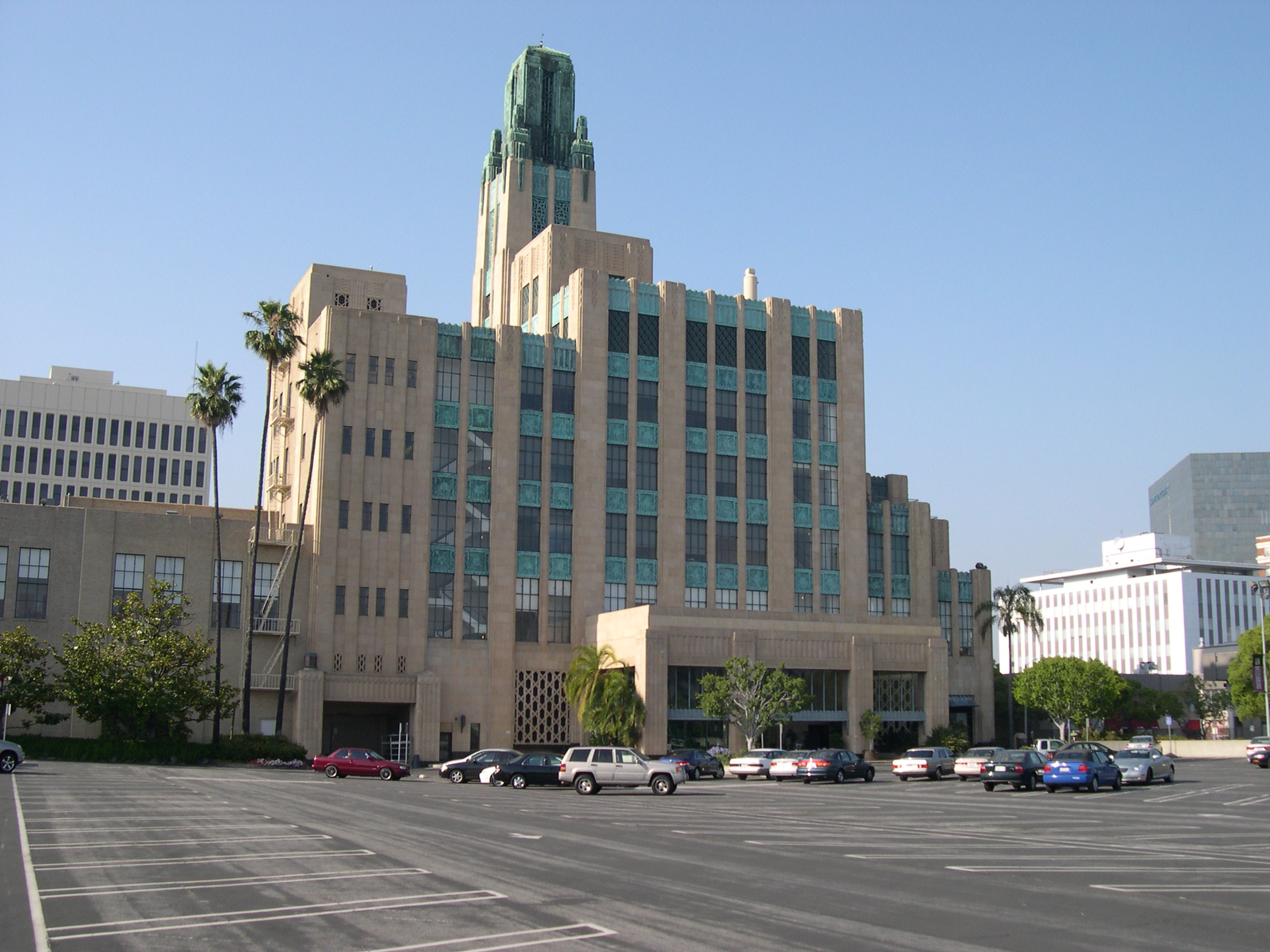
Bullocks Wilshire south façade

=== Decline ===
In the early 1970s, this sub-division of Bullock's dropped its apostrophe and began opening separate branch locations so as to separate its decidedly luxury identity from its larger yet more upper-moderate/better parent. Branches were located in Palm Springs (1947), Woodland Hills (The Promenade) (1973; 80,000 square feet), Newport Beach (Fashion Island) (1977; 80,000 square feet), La Jolla (1979), Palos Verdes (1981), and Palm Desert (formerly Bonwit Teller; 1987; 50,000 square feet). The branches of Woodland Hills and Newport Beach were designed by the Los Angeles firm of Welton Becket and Associates. Over the years, a shift by other luxury stores and boutiques to the west side of the city/county resulted in the primary Bullocks Wilshire trading area's fall, yet the main store held on as a destination until 1988, when it began its own precipitous decline, hastened under operation by its final owners, Macy's, who had acquired the chain from the Campeau Corporation. The Wilshire Boulevard store suffered severe damage during the Los Angeles riots of 1992; looters broke in and shattered every display case on the first floor. The upper floors were not damaged because fleeing staffers shut off the elevators; the original decision to build the store without escalators may have actually saved the landmark from ruin. At least three fires were set by arsonists, but they did not spread. Bullocks Wilshire finally closed in 1993 with legal battles ensuing as Macy's stripped the store of its historic artifacts, furnishings and fixtures for other locations (bowing to pressure, almost all the 1929 fixtures were returned). Its locations had been converted around 1990 to I. Magnin, a San Francisco-based luxury chain which in turn was shuttered by Federated Department Stores in January 1995 upon its acquisition of Macy's.

=== Current use of building ===
In 1994, the building was acquired by Southwestern Law School, its long-time neighbor. The school restored the building to its original 1929 state, adapting the building for use as an integral part of the school. The building is a historic-cultural monument of the City of Los Angeles, and was listed in the National Register of Historic Places May 25, 1978.

The Southwestern Law School Office of Administrative Services is responsible for all arrangements pertaining to commercial photography and filming on Southwestern's campus and works with Unreel Locations.

== Bullocks Wilshire chain ==
Bullocks Wilshire was one of the more important divisions of Bullock's, Inc. until it was consolidated into I. Magnin by Macy's in 1989. The division could be traced to the opening of a single luxury branch store of Bullock's in 1929. In 1968, The Bullock's store in Palm Springs (built in 1947) was transferred to the control of Bullock's Wilshire to be its first branch store. Four years later, in 1972, Bullock's Wilshire store was separated from Bullock's as a separate division with its own, president, chairman, buyers and staff with Walter Bergquist, former president of Bullock's, assigned as the division's first president.

=== Bullocks Wilshire locations ===
Source: Bullock's Department Store by Devin T. Frick

- Wilshire (freestanding), opened September 24, 1929 – now occupied by Southwestern Law School
- Palm Springs (freestanding), opened October 18, 1947
- Woodland Hills Promenade, opened August 20, 1973
- Newport Beach (Fashion Island), opened August 1, 1977 – razed, now site of Nordstrom
- La Jolla Village Square, San Diego, opened August 20, 1979
- Palos Verdes (Rolling Hills Estates), (The Courtyard, now Promenade on the Peninsula), opened September 28, 1981 – now individual retail stores and cinema
- Palm Desert Town Center, opened February 7, 1987
- Bullocks Lakewood Center – razed – Now a Home Depot

== Appearances in media ==
- Dunston Checks In (1996 film)
- Visiting... with Huell Howser Episode 810
- Love in an Elevator music video by Aerosmith
- 2011's L.A. Noire, appearing as a landmark the player can find.

== See also ==
- National Register of Historic Places listings in Los Angeles
- List of Los Angeles Historic-Cultural Monuments in the Wilshire and Westlake areas
- List of defunct department stores of the United States
