= Palos Verdes Library District =

Libraries in California, US

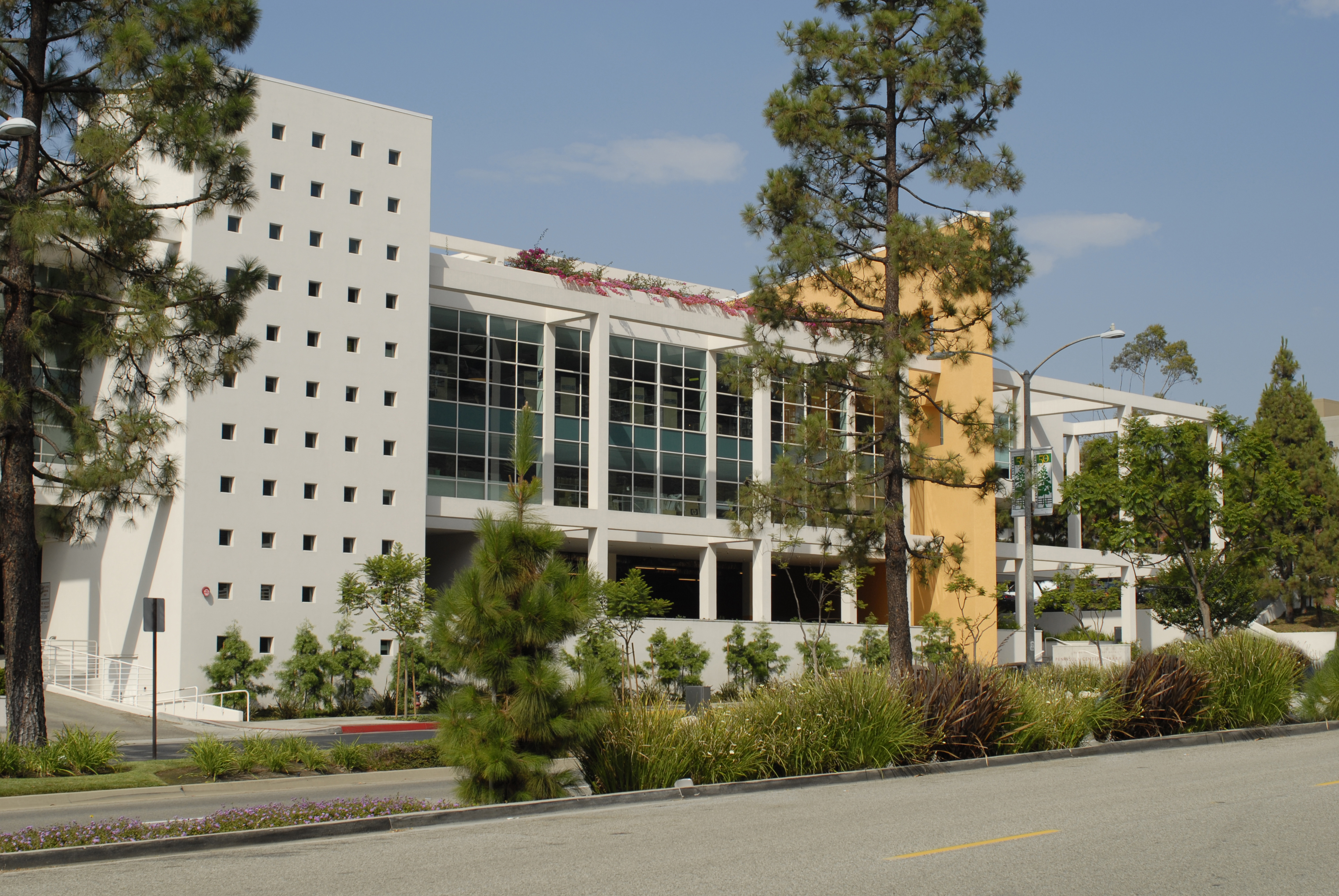
- Peninsula Center Library
- 33°46′14″N 118°22′14″W
- Location: Palos Verdes Peninsula, region in Los Angeles County, United States
- Type: Library district
- Established: 1928
- Branches: 3

Collection
- Items collected: Books; audiobooks; eBooks; magazines; film; music; scores; online resources; databases
- Size: 224,000

Access and use
- Circulation: 654,000
- Population served: 69,843

Other information
- Budget: $12,000,000+ per annum
- Director: Jennifer Addington
- President: Jonathan Beutler
- Vice president: Kingston Wong
- Employees: 88
- Website: www.pvld.org

The Palos Verdes Library District (PVLD) is an independent special library district serving the residents of the Palos Verdes Peninsula in Southern California. PVLD is governed by a publicly elected Board of Trustees that consists of five members who voluntarily serve without monetary compensation. PVLD's three libraries—Peninsula Center Library, Malaga Cove Library, and Miraleste Library—serve the cities of Palos Verdes Estates, Rancho Palos Verdes, Rolling Hills Estates, and Rolling Hills, California, as well as the unincorporated communities on the Palos Verdes Peninsula.

== History ==
The Peninsula Center Library, which is PVLD's main library facility, was completed in 1967 and significantly enlarged in 1995. It is located on Silver Spur Road in the City of Rolling Hills Estates. Palos Verdes Library District also has two branch libraries, Malaga Cove Library and Miraleste Library. Malaga Cove Library, adjacent to Farnham Martin Park in the City of Palos Verdes Estates, was designed by Myron Hunt and built in 1929. It was designated as a historical landmark in 1980 by the Rancho de los Palos Verdes Historical Society and placed on the National Register of Historic Places and the California register of Historical Resources in 1995. In July, 1999, Farnham Martin Park was deeded to the City of Palos Verdes Estates. Farnham Martin Park, which was designed by the Olmsted Brothers, formed by urban designers Frederick Law Olmsted, Jr. and John Charles Olmsted, was added to the National and State registers in 1996. Miraleste Library, designed by architect Thomas J. Russell, was completed in 1970 and is located on Palos Verdes Drive East, adjacent to the Miraleste Intermediate School in Rancho Palos Verdes.

== Board of Trustees ==
The Palos Verdes Library District is a public agency governed by a Board of Trustees, which was first incepted in 1928. The Board consists of five elected members, who serve for four-year staggered terms and may be re-elected. The current President of the Board of Trustees is Jonathan Beutler. Voting constituents include voters in all four cities on the Palos Verdes Peninsula, as well as adjacent unincorporated areas.

The elections for PVLD Trustees are held on even-numbered years in conjunction with the November General Election, as managed by the County of Los Angeles, with candidates coming from the communities of the Palos Verdes Peninsula.

== Volunteers and supporters ==
The Peninsula Friends of the Library is an all-volunteer membership organization, founded in 1961, to enhance the services and programs of the Peninsula libraries. Its membership fees, along with funds raised through book sales and the Library Shop at Peninsula Center Library, and other events are used to provide ongoing support for many library services and programs, including:

- Special purchases of items for the library collections, furnishings, and equipment
- Sunday Hours at the Peninsula Center Library
- Summer Reading Program
