= Herman Sachs =

- Born: July 24, 1883 near Bacau, Romania
- Died: November 11, 1940 (aged 57); Los Angeles, CA, USA
- Movement: German Arts and Crafts, German Expressionism, Art Deco

Herman Sachs (Hermann Sachs, originally Segall) (1883–1940) was an artist and art educator, based in Los Angeles, and active in Germany and the United States during the first half of the 20th century. One of his best-known works is a ceiling painting of California poppies at Union Station, versions of which also appear in floor tiles and the walls of the station, uniting its design. This work was covered by a thick layer of soot and was rediscovered during Union Station's restoration process.

== Biography ==
Born to a Jewish family in Romania, Sachs first received art training as a child under his father. He immigrated to the U.S. due to antisemitism in Europe at age 17, settling in Chicago. Sachs later returned to Europe to attend art school in Germany, spending the 1910s in Munich, where he founded the Munich School of Expressionists (Munich Expressionist Werkstätten).

Upon returning to the United States in 1920, Sachs exhibited at the Art Institute of Chicago and established the Chicago Industrial Art School. Afterward, Sachs became the first Director of the Dayton Museum of Fine Arts, now the Dayton Art Institute. During this time, he also served as the U.S. representative of artist George Grosz.

Around 1925, Sachs moved to Los Angeles to design the interiors of the new Gas Company building. As a muralist and decorator, Sachs went on to design the interiors of many Los Angeles landmarks, including the Bullocks Wilshire building (now home to Southwestern Law School), Union Station, Los Angeles City Hall, and the Title Insurance and Trust Company Building. An educator as well as an artist, Sachs also directed the Creative Art Students League of Los Angeles.

Sachs was active within the L.A. Jewish exile community of artists, writers, and filmmakers who had fled Europe due to the rise of Nazism, and later the Holocaust. His friend, the architect Rudolph Schindler, designed Sachs' L.A. house, the Manola Court Apartments.

== Works ==
- Photography in S. Mollier, Plastische Anatomie. Die konstruktive Form des menschlichen Korpers (Munich: J.F. Bergman, 1924)
- Los Angeles City Hall (color consultant), Los Angeles, CA, USA, 1926–28
- Lehrbuch der Maltechnik (Berlin: Wasmuth, 1927)
- Title Insurance and Trust Company Building, 1928
- The Spirit of Transportation: mural in the porte-cochere of Bullocks Wilshire, Los Angeles, CA, USA, 1929
- Union Station (color consultant, ceiling paintings of California wildflowers, painted floor tiles and walls with same motif as well), Los Angeles, CA, USA, 1934–39
