= Title Insurance Building =

Building in Los Angeles, California

- U.S. Historic district – Contributing property
- Los Angeles Historic-Cultural Monument
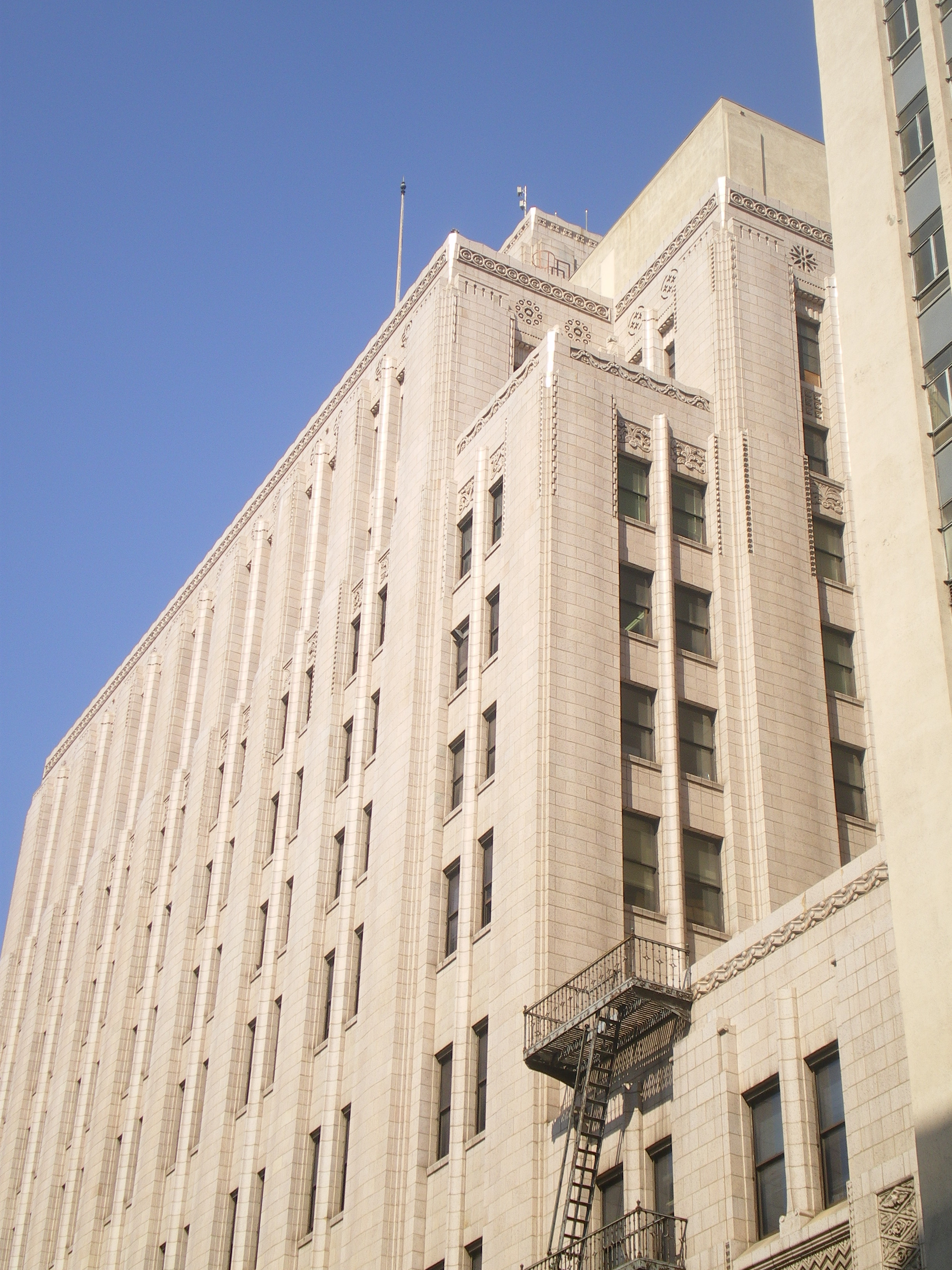
- The building in 2008

- Location within the Los Angeles metropolitan area
- Location: 433 S. Spring Street, Los Angeles, California
- Coordinates: 34.04449°N 118.25258°W
- Built: 1928
- Architect: Parkinson and Parkinson
- Architectural style: Zigzag Moderne
- Part of: Spring Street Financial District (ID79000489)
- LAHCM No.: 385

Significant dates
- Designated CP: August 10, 1979
- Designated LAHCM: August 5, 1988

Title Insurance Building, also known as Title Insurance & Trust Company Building and Annex, Design Center of Los Angeles, The Queen of Spring Street, and UCLA Downtown, is a historic building located at 433 S. Spring Street in downtown Los Angeles, California. It is a Los Angeles Historic Cultural Monument and a contributing property in the Spring Street Financial District.

== History ==
Title Insurance Building was designed by Parkinson and Parkinson and built by the Scofield Engineering-Construction Company in 1928. Herman Sachs and Hugo Ball designed the marble lobby and Zigzag Moderne styling. The building housed the headquarters of Title Insurance and Trust Company from 1928 to 1977. Nelson Rising also opened his first office in the building in 1970.

A thirteen-story annex was added to the building's immediate north in 1929. Originally a parking garage, the annex's fourth through thirteenth floors were converted to offices in 1954.

In 1979, the Spring Street Financial District was added to the National Register of Historic Places, with Title Insurance Building listed as a contributing property and Title Insurance Building Annex listed as a non-contributing property in the district. Architect developer Ragnar C. Qvale bought the building and converted it into the Design Center of Los Angeles that same year. The building was leased to wholesale furniture showrooms in 1981. At the time, the building was known as "The Queen of Spring Street."

In 1987, the building served as a temporary home for Los Angeles Central Library while the library was reconstructed following a fire. The building and its annex were declared Los Angeles Historic Cultural Monument No. 898 on August 5, 1988.

Capital Foresight bought the building for $15.2 million in 2012 ($21.3 million in 2025); the company along with Izek Shomof planned to convert the building to 200 residential units but never did. The building was sold for more than five times its 2012 purchase price in 2016. It was renovated into "creative offices" the following year. Nelson Rising redeveloped the building in 2017; the estimated redevelopment cost was $40 million ($53.7 million in 2025).

In 2022, the University of California Los Angeles bought the building to house classrooms and offices. The building had been recently restored. José Andrés was also set to open a restaurant in the building.

== Architecture and design ==
Title Insurance Building is ten stories (plus a double basement) and made of steel and reinforced concrete with a brick and terra cotta facade. The building is rectangular, contains two wings that are shorter than the main portion of the building, and features Zigzag Moderne styling that heavily emphasizes verticality. The second story features large rectangular windows covered by iron grates, while the upper-floors contain smaller windows and the top of the building features decorative molding.

Inside, the building has a vestibule whose ceiling was treated with polychrome tile and a first-floor six-elevator lobby that features marble, mosaic floors, a smooth plaster ceiling, cast brass metalwork, and murals by Hugo Ballin. The second floor elevator lobby contains marble, cast bronze, and a coffered ceiling. The building also contains a first-to-second floor marble stairway, marble hallways, bronze light fixtures, mosaic ceilings, and about 335,000 square feet (31,100 m^{2}) of floorspace.

Title Insurance Building Annex is 13 stories, made of reinforced concrete, and finished with plaster and concrete above a ground level granite base. It features an International Style design with a flat facade punctuated by three vertical window bands and slightly recessed windows. The ground level features three entrances, one large and central for cars and two smaller building entrances. A flat canopy is above the southern-most entrance. A mechanical penthouse is set back from the building's parapet.

== See also ==
- List of contributing properties in the Spring Street Financial District
