= Title Insurance and Trust Company =

California business (1893-1968)

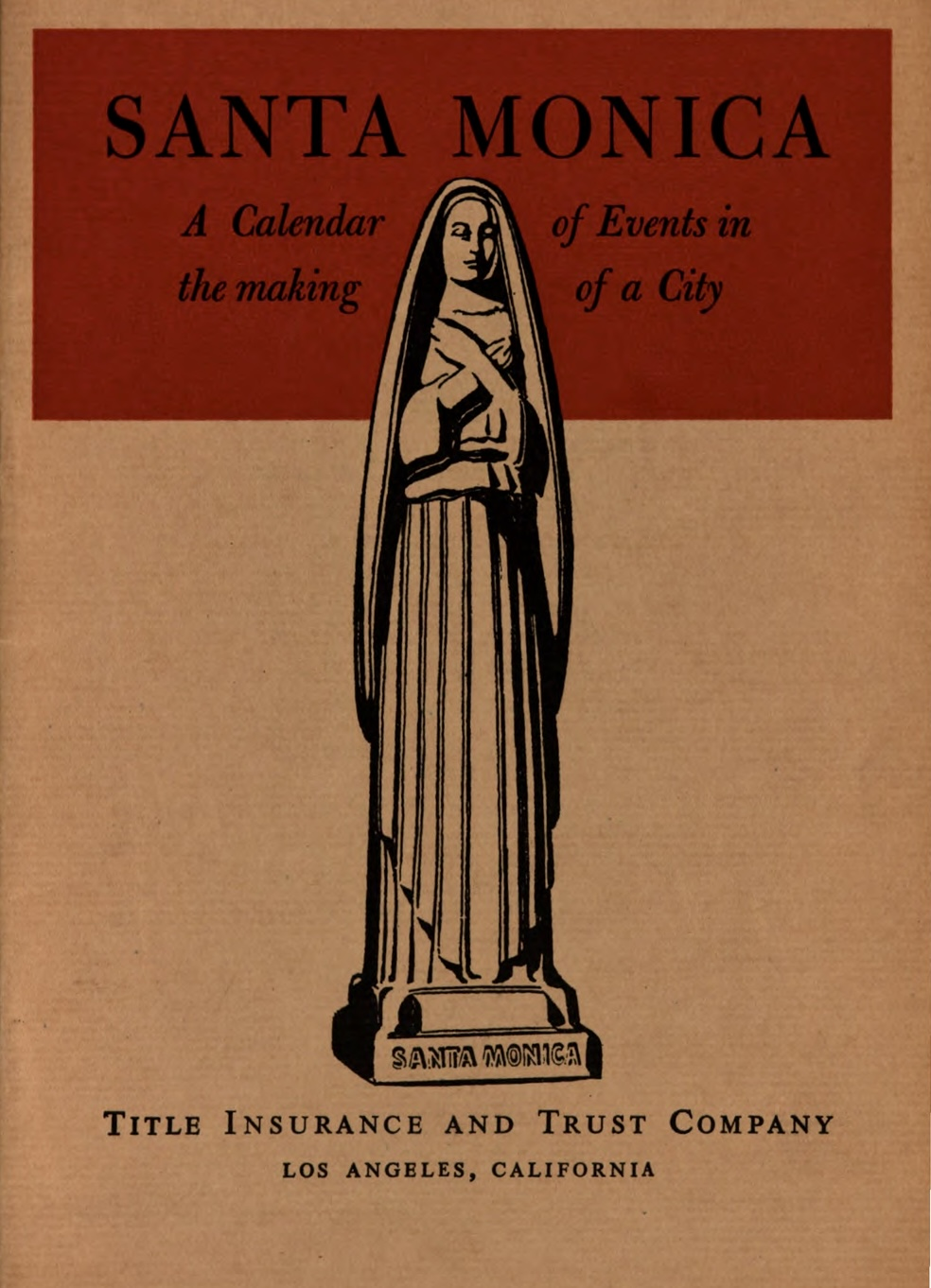
Title Insurance's history of Santa Monica, California. The cover art depicts Eugene Morahan's sculpture of the same name.

Title Insurance and Trust Company was a title insurance company based in Los Angeles. The company was known for accumulating a notable collection of historic photographs (now in the collection of the California Historical Society) and commissioning writers, such as W. W. Robinson, to write a series of pamphlets about the history of regions and neighborhoods in Southern California.

The Title Insurance and Trust Company Building at 433 S. Spring Street, the company's third sequential headquarters building, was used from 1928 to 1977. Prior to 1928, the company had offices at the northwest corner of 8th and Hill, now the site of the Garfield Building, and at the northeast corner of 8th and Hope.
