= Rolling Hills Country Day School =

School in California, United States

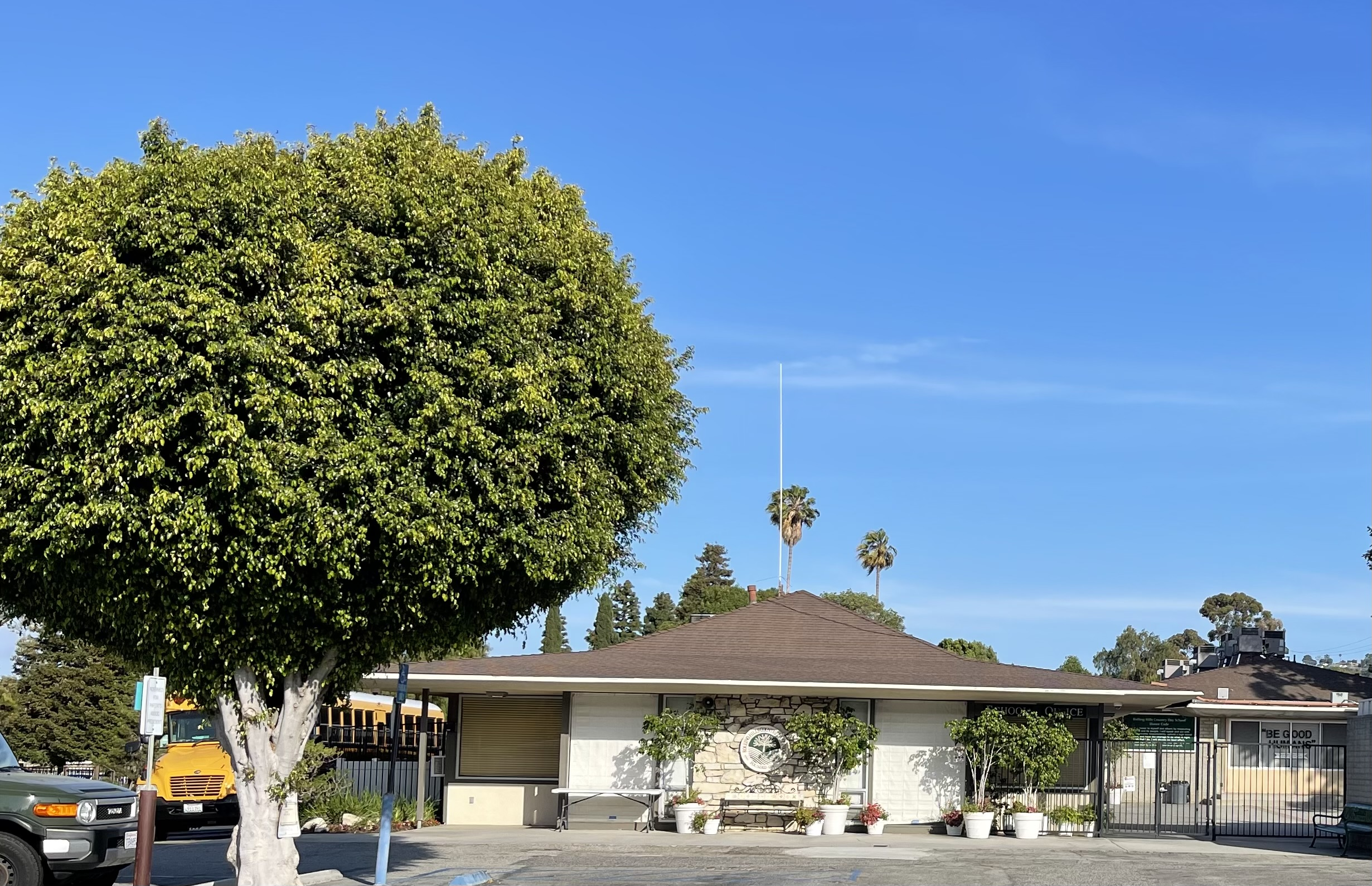

Location
- 26444 Crenshaw Blvd, Palos Verdes Peninsula, CA 90274; United States; 33°47′00″N 118°21′04″W

Information
- Established: 1961
- Grades: K-8
- Accreditation: Western Association of Schools and Colleges
- Website: rhcds.com

Rolling Hills Country Day School is a nonsectarian independent Kindergarten to Grade 8 school located in Rolling Hills Estates on the Palos Verdes Peninsula in Los Angeles County, California. The school is a for-profit school, owned by the school administration, the director and vice principal hold majority shares.

== History ==
Rolling Hills Country Day School was founded in 1961. It is accredited by the Western Association of Schools and Colleges.

=== Student population ===
The school has 395 students from approximately nine local communities (for 2017–2018), Lower School (Kindergarten through Grade 5): 231 students, Middle School (Grades 6 through 8): 150 students. 70 percent Caucasian, 21 percent Asian, 4 percent Middle Eastern, 2 percent Hispanic, 3 percent African American.

=== Faculty ===
Kindergarten through Grade 8 Faculty: 38, Number of faculty with advanced degrees: 45 percent, Student-to-Faculty ratio: Average of 12:1

== Intracurriculars ==
The school's co-curricular programs offer programs in the following areas:

1. Outdoor Education
2. The Arts
3. Athletics
4. Community Service
5. After School Programs

=== The arts ===
Singing, painting, and drawing are incorporated into students’ studies beginning in Kindergarten. Students in the third grade perform The Nutcracker adapted into a musical. For the fourth grade mission project students paint and fire Spanish tiles depicting their particular California mission. Fourth grade students continue their studies of California history by performing a play called Oh California! and fifth grade students perform a play called Fifty Nifty while studying United States history.

Facilities include: Music Room, Art studio, Multi-Purpose Room for live performances

=== Athletics ===
In addition to a full-time physical education program with four dedicated teachers, Rolling Hills Country Day School also offers after school sports for middle school students. All students are invited to participate in volleyball, basketball, soccer, swimming, and water polo in an organized league.

=== Community service ===
Community Service is an important part of Country Day School. There are a variety of activities in which students become involved throughout the year, whether as part of their classroom experience or out in the community. The school has holiday giving programs that collect food and gifts for families at a nearby disadvantaged school for both Thanksgiving and Christmas. The school also holds an annual food drive to supplement local food banks. In the past, students have also collected coats and shoes and delivered them to local schools and overseas. The student council regularly holds bake sales to raise money for worldwide disasters. In addition, its students visit local assisted living facilities.

== After school programs ==
Country Day School offers options for after school care for students. It has several programs, including Homework club, freestyle aquatics and after care, from dismissal to 6 pm.

== Athletics ==
=== Physical education ===
Throughout the school year students take part in a variety of selected activities, including yoga and swim.

=== After school athletics ===
The RHCDS competitive sports program provides Middle School students with an opportunity to participate in the following sports: Co-Ed Water Polo, Co-Ed Swim Team, Boys and Girls Soccer, Boys and Girls Basketball, Boys and Girls Volleyball. The school is part of the South Bay Athletic League.

== Campus ==
The campus is located in Rolling Hills Estates, CA. All grades have enough iPads for the whole class available for each child to use. Facilities include six school buildings, two science labs, library, junior olympic size swimming pool, one full and two half basketball courts, one volleyball court, playground, synthetic turf sports field, music room, art studio, multi-purpose room for live performances, and iMac computer lab.

== Accreditations ==
Western Association of Schools and Colleges (WASC).

=== Affiliations ===
Western Association of Schools and Colleges (WASC), Educational Records Bureau (ERB), California Kindergarten Association.
