= Rolling Hills Estates, California =

City in California, United States

- City
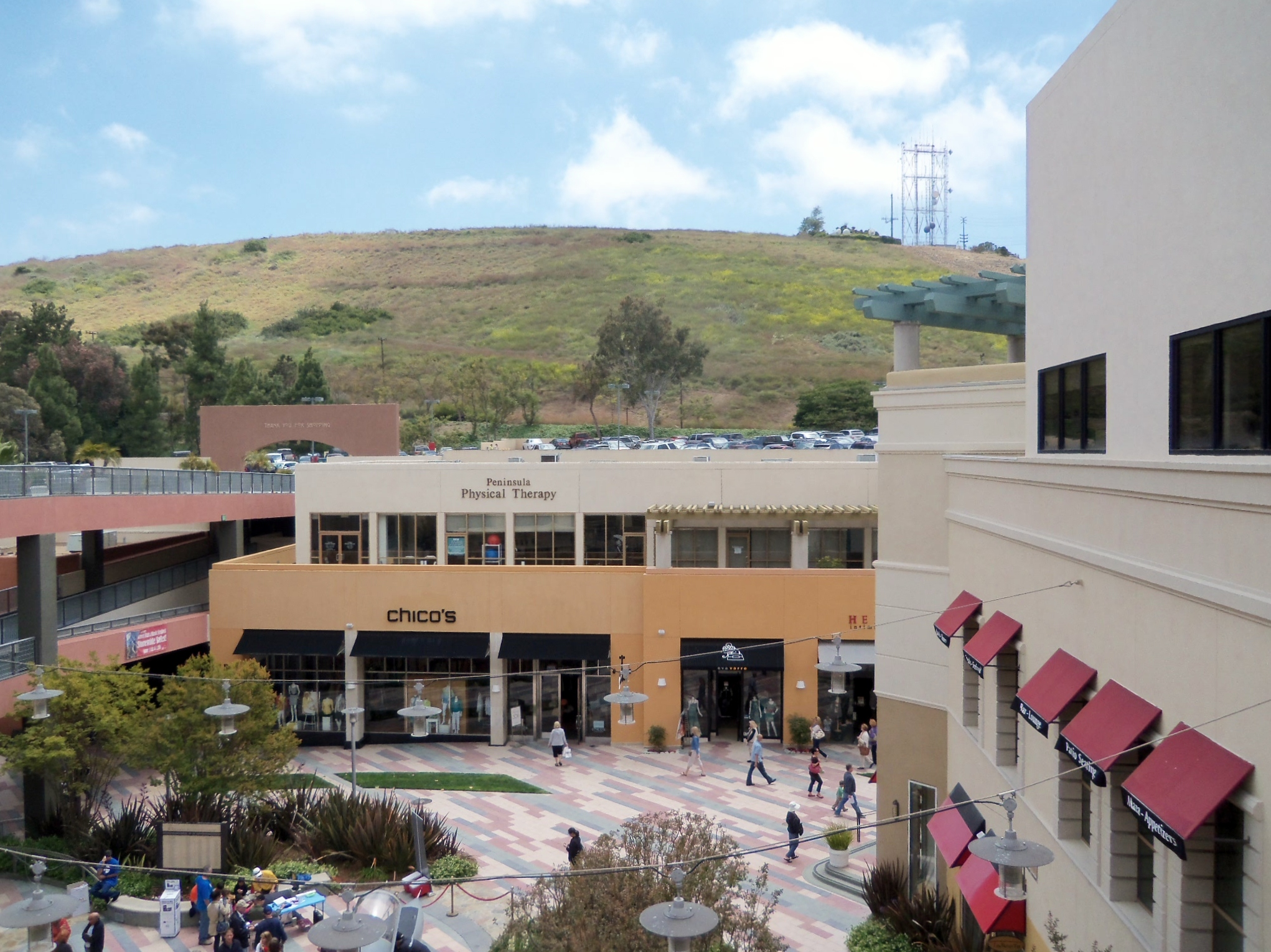
- Promenade on the Peninsula mall, Rolling Hills Estates

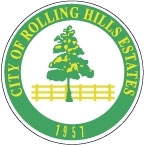
- Seal
- Interactive map of Rolling Hills Estates, California
- Location in the United States
- Coordinates: 33°46′25″N 118°21′39″W
- Country: United States
- State: California
- County: Los Angeles
- CCD: Palos Verdes
- Incorporated: September 18, 1957

Government
  - Type: Council-Manager
  - Mayor: Debby Stegura

Area
  - Total: 3.61 sq mi (9.36 km^{2})
  - Land: 3.58 sq mi (9.26 km^{2})
  - Water: 0.035 sq mi (0.09 km^{2}) 1.00%
- Elevation: 469 ft (143 m)

Population (2020)
  - Total: 8,280
  - Density: 2,320/sq mi (894/km^{2})
- Time zone: UTC−8 (PST)
  - Summer (DST): UTC−7 (PDT)
- ZIP Codes: 90274–90275
- Area code: 310
- FIPS code: 06-62644
- GNIS feature IDs: 1661326, 2410987
- Website: www.rollinghillsestates.gov

Rolling Hills Estates is a city in Los Angeles County, California, United States. On the northern side of the Palos Verdes Peninsula, facing Torrance, Rolling Hills Estates is mostly residential. Incorporated in 1957, Rolling Hills Estates has many horse paths. The population was 8,280 at the 2020 census, up from 8,067 at the 2010 census.

== History ==
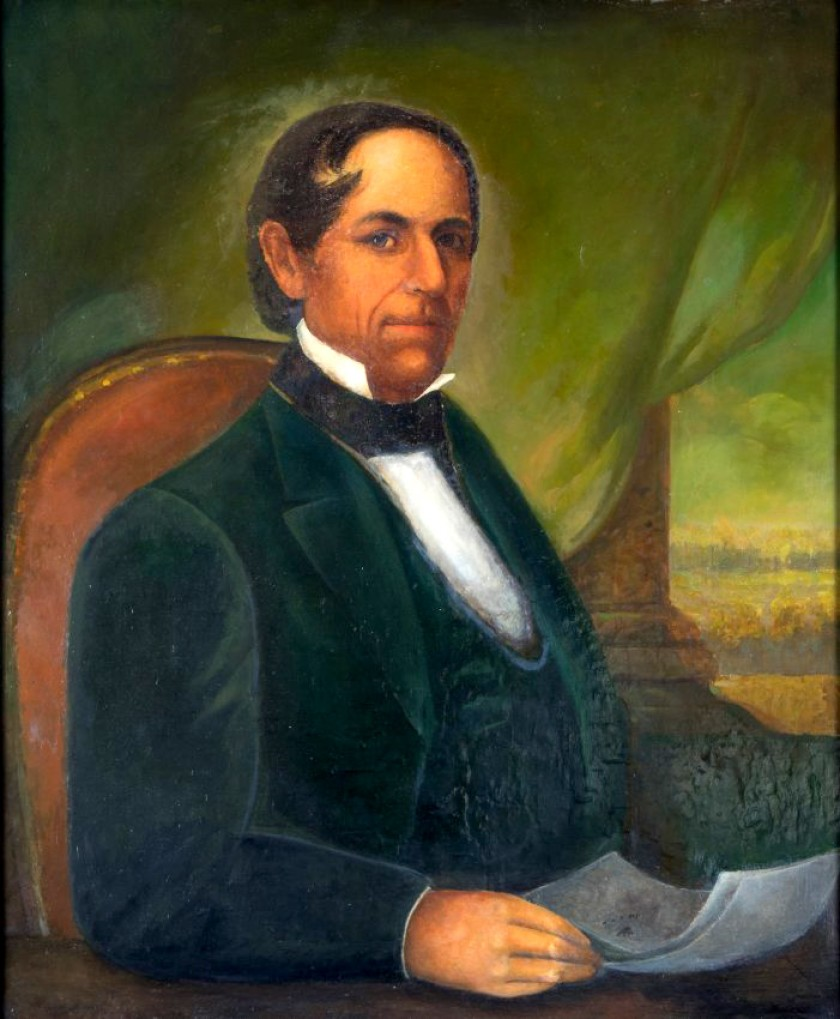
Manuel Domínguez, a signer of the Californian Constitution and owner of Rancho San Pedro, which included all of Palos Verdes Peninsula.

Rolling Hills Estates was historically part of Rancho San Pedro. The area eventually became known as Rancho El Elastico prior to incorporating as Rolling Hills Estates. It was Los Angeles County's 60th municipality, incorporated on September 18, 1957.

== Geography ==
Rolling Hills Estates is located on the Palos Verdes Peninsula. According to the United States Census Bureau, the city has a total area of 3.6 square miles (9.358 km^{2}), of which 0.04 square miles (0.094 km^{2}) (1.00%) is water.

=== Peartree Lane Landslide ===
Rollings Hills Estates is located on the northern side of the Palos Verdes Peninsula, an area that has a history of documented landslides. On July 8, 2023, the Peartree Lane Landslide destroyed several homes in Rolling Hills Estates. This landslide may have started in 2022.

== Demographics ==
Historical population
Census	Pop.	Note	%±
1960	3,941		—
1970	6,735		70.9%
1980	7,701		14.3%
1990	7,789		1.1%
2000	7,676		−1.5%
2010	8,067		5.1%
2020	8,280		2.6%
2024 (est.)	8,007	▼	−3.3%
U.S. Decennial Census; 1860–1870 1880-1890; 1900 1910 1920; 1930 1940 1950; 1960 1970 1980; 1990 2000 2010; 2020

Rolling Hills Estates first appeared as a city in the 1960 U.S. census as part of the Palos Verdes census county division.

=== Racial and ethnic composition ===
Rolling Hills Estates city, California – Racial and ethnic composition Note: the US Census treats Hispanic/Latino as an ethnic category. This table excludes Latinos from the racial categories and assigns them to a separate category. Hispanics/Latinos may be of any race.
Race / Ethnicity (NH = Non-Hispanic)	Pop 1980	Pop 1990	Pop 2000	Pop 2010	Pop 2020	% 1980	% 1990	% 2000	% 2010	% 2020
White alone (NH)	6,813	6,129	5,418	5,134	4,492	88.47%	78.69%	70.58%	63.64%	54.25%
Black or African American alone (NH)	106	60	88	107	90	1.38%	0.77%	1.15%	1.33%	1.09%
Native American or Alaska Native alone (NH)	23	5	17	12	13	0.30%	0.06%	0.22%	0.15%	0.16%
Asian alone (NH)	442	1,246	1,549	1,995	2,492	5.74%	16.00%	20.18%	24.73%	30.10%
Native Hawaiian or Pacific Islander alone (NH)	442	1,246	6	8	7	5.74%	16.00%	0.08%	0.10%	0.08%
Other race alone (NH)	15	x	22	19	71	0.19%	0.13%	0.29%	0.24%	0.86%
Mixed race or Multiracial (NH)	x	x	210	293	475	x	x	2.74%	3.63%	5.74%
Hispanic or Latino (any race)	302	339	366	499	640	3.92%	4.35%	4.77%	6.19%	7.73%
Total	7,701	7,789	7,676	8,067	8,280	100.00%	100.00%	100.00%	100.00%	100.00%

=== 2020 census ===
As of the 2020 census, Rolling Hills Estates had a population of 8,280 and a population density of 2,314.8 inhabitants per square mile (893.7/km^{2}). 100.0% of residents lived in urban areas, while 0.0% lived in rural areas.

The whole population lived in households. There were 3,030 households, out of which 32.3% included children under the age of 18, 68.0% were married-couple households, 2.0% were cohabiting couple households, 20.9% had a female householder with no spouse or partner present, and 9.1% had a male householder with no spouse or partner present. About 17.3% of households were one person, and 13.1% were one person aged 65 or older. The average household size was 2.73. There were 2,404 families (79.3% of all households).

The age distribution was 20.7% under the age of 18, 7.2% aged 18 to 24, 14.1% aged 25 to 44, 31.1% aged 45 to 64, and 26.9% aged 65 or older. The median age was 50.4 years. For every 100 females, there were 92.7 males, and for every 100 females age 18 and over there were 89.4 males.

There were 3,220 housing units at an average density of 900.2 units per square mile (347.6 units/km^{2}), of which 3,030 (94.1%) were occupied. Of occupied units, 89.8% were owner-occupied and 10.2% were renter-occupied. The homeowner vacancy rate was 2.5% and the rental vacancy rate was 8.8%.

=== Income and poverty ===
In 2023, the US Census Bureau estimated that the median household income was $187,500, and the per capita income was $84,746. About 3.9% of families and 3.5% of the population were below the poverty line.

=== 2010 census ===
The 2010 US Census reported that Rolling Hills Estates had a population of 8,067. The population density was 2,232.4 inhabitants per square mile (861.9/km^{2}). The racial makeup of Rolling Hills Estates was 5,463 (67.7%) White (63.6% Non-Hispanic White), 109 (1.4%) African American, 19 (0.2%) Native American, 2,007 (24.9%) Asian, 8 (0.1%) Pacific Islander, 120 (1.5%) from other races, and 341 (4.2%) from two or more races. Hispanic or Latino of any race were 499 people (6.2%).

The whole population lived in households, no one lived in non-institutionalized group quarters and no one was institutionalized.

There were 2,965 households, 1,023 (34.5%) had children under the age of 18 living in them, 2,100 (70.8%) were opposite-sex married couples living together, 192 (6.5%) had a female householder with no husband present, 83 (2.8%) had a male householder with no wife present. There were 45 (1.5%) unmarried opposite-sex partnerships, and 23 (0.8%) same-sex married couples or partnerships. 512 households (17.3%) were one person and 353 (11.9%) had someone living alone who was 65 or older. The average household size was 2.72. There were 2,375 families (80.1% of households); the average family size was 3.07.

The age distribution was 1,890 people (23.4%) under the age of 18, 417 people (5.2%) aged 18 to 24, 1,211 people (15.0%) aged 25 to 44, 2,680 people (33.2%) aged 45 to 64, and 1,869 people (23.2%) who were 65 or older. The median age was 48.5 years. For every 100 females, there were 93.0 males. For every 100 females age 18 and over, there were 89.2 males.

There were 3,100 housing units at an average density of 857.9 per square mile, of the occupied units 2,714 (91.5%) were owner-occupied and 251 (8.5%) were rented. The homeowner vacancy rate was 1.8%; the rental vacancy rate was 4.9%. 7,302 people (90.5% of the population) lived in owner-occupied housing units and 765 people (9.5%) lived in rental housing units.

According to the 2010 United States Census, Rolling Hills Estates had a median household income of $143,958, with 3.5% of the population living below the federal poverty line.

=== Ethnic groups ===
By 1992 many wealthier Korean Americans moved to the Palos Verdes Peninsula. Rolling Hills Estates was among five cities in the South Bay that had the largest increases in ethnic Koreans from 1980 to 1990. In 1990, 200 ethnic Koreans lived in Rolling Hills Estates, a 160% increase from the 1980 figure of 77 ethnic Koreans.

English and German were the most common ancestries in 2000.

== Education ==
Rolling Hills Estates is part of the public Palos Verdes Peninsula Unified School District.

Private schools include Rolling Hills Country Day School (K–8) and Chadwick School (K–12).

Nishiyamato Academy of California, originally housed in the former Dapplegray School building in Rolling Hills Estates, is now located in Lomita.

The Palos Verdes Library District operates the Peninsula Center Library in Rolling Hills Estates.

== Economy ==
=== Top employers ===
According to the city's 2009 Comprehensive Annual Financial Report, the top employers in the city are:

#	Employer	# of Employees
1	Palos Verdes Peninsula Unified School District	
2	Equinox Fitness	115
3	Pavilions	100
4	Rolling Hills Country Club	100
5	Rolling Hills Covenant Church	95
6	Bristol Farms	85
7	Marmalade Café	69
8	CVS/pharmacy	65
9	Red Onion	60
10	Spectrum Athletic Clubs	60

=== Retail ===
The city contains The Promenade on the Peninsula mall, originally an enclosed regional mall with two department store anchors, May Company California and Bullocks Wilshire, as well as the Peninsula Center, which originally had a Buffums department store.

== Representation ==
In the California State Legislature, Rolling Hills Estates is in the 24th senatorial district, represented by Democrat Ben Allen, and in the 66th Assembly district, represented by Democrat Al Muratsuchi.

In the United States House of Representatives, Rolling Hills Estates is in California's 36th congressional district, represented by Democrat Ted Lieu.

The Los Angeles County Sheriff's Department (LASD) operates the Lomita Station in Lomita, serving Rolling Hills Estates.

The Los Angeles County Department of Health Services operates the Torrance Health Center in Harbor Gateway, Los Angeles, near Torrance and serving Rolling Hills Estates.
