= Healy House =

Coordinates: 34.0785°N 118.4479°W

The Healy House at 565 (formerly 625), Perugia Way in the Bel Air district of Los Angeles was built in 1949 by the Modernist architect Lloyd Wright, son of Frank Lloyd Wright for a P. J. Healy. He then sold it to Prince Aly Khan, who lived there in 1959, coinciding with the last year of his marriage to Rita Hayworth. The next owner was the Shah of Iran, who purchased it in 1960 only to rent it to Elvis Presley, who used the home during the periods from 1961 to 1962 and then again from 1964 to late 1965. As such, it was the site of The Beatles only meeting with Presley on 27 August 1965.

A letter writer to the Los Angeles Times in 1998 described the house as offering "a graceful and optimistic view of the future: a Usonian ranch house nestled in the bowl of a concrete flying saucer that hovers over the golf course below" and its replacement as a "kitschy and grandiose neo-baroque structure".
