= Through a Naked Lens =

Play by George Barthel

Through a Naked Lens is a 2005 American play by author George Barthel. It received its world premiere Off-Broadway at the Wings Theatre in New York City. The play itself uses historical evidence and imagined circumstances to depict the rise of early Hollywood film star Ramón Novarro. While a celebration of Novarro’s life, the drama is told largely through the perspective of reporter Herbert Howe. While Barthel places Howe and Novarro in a romantic relationship, it is unknown if such a connection actually existed. Howe did, however, spend a great deal of time with Novarro as his publicist. The play also features Alice Terry, Rex Ingram, Irving Thalberg, Jim Quirk, Adela Rogers St. Johns, and Louis B. Mayer as characters.

== Synopsis ==
The play opens with journalist Adela Rogers St. Johns and Jim Quirk, editor of Photoplay magazine, discussing Herbert Howe’s latest article and his general reputation around Hollywood as an ace reporter willing to do nearly anything to get an interview or story. Howe enters, and after a brief discussion about the tactics Howe implements to get his stories, St. Johns and Quirk leave. Tracy, a new reporter, enters and attempts to seduce Howe so that he might mentor her. She is quickly rebuffed. Howe does, however, give her one piece of advice: to never make any friends.

Quirk eventually drops a bomb on Howe: That the bosses at MGM want him to follow around new star Ramón Novarro and help promote Rex Ingram’s latest film, The Arab. Howe seems hesitant, but at the insistence of Quirk and thanks to a hefty paycheck from the studio, he agrees. Howe eventually meets Novarro as their ship is ready to depart for Tunisia. At first the pair do not seem to get along, but Howe is impressed with Novarro’s poise and confidence. After a very brief courtship, the two men become an item.

On location, Rex Ingram directs Novarro and his wife, Alice Terry in The Arab. While all four individuals are friends, Howe becomes frustrated with the long hours Novarro spends on set and his willingness to do whatever Ingram demands of him. Meanwhile, back in California, St. Johns tells Terry that Howe’s latest articles are unlike anything she’s seen from the writer. They are complementary. The play cuts back to Tunisia where Ingram and Howe come to blows over Novarro’s schedule, and eventually Ingram relents and lets the two spend more time together.

As the articles continue down the path of homosexual innuendo, L.B. Mayer grows agitated. “Boy Wonder” Irving G. Thalberg seems more relaxed and understanding of the situation, but agrees to ask Howe to tone things down. The first act ends with Novarro learning that he has been selected to play the lead in the epic film Ben-Hur, implying that he is about to become very famous.

The second act opens with a sympathetic St. Johns warning Howe that Novarro’s career is on the rise and his life very public. Quirk infuriates Terry, who was covering for Howe in his absence, by demoting her to covering small stories.

Howe meets with Novarro who is busy preparing for a press conference and expresses dismay that he can never be close to him in public. A shouting match ensues in front of a few crewmembers that threatens to blow their “cover.” Novarro, desperate, punches Howe in the face and then runs into his dressing room. Howe becomes uncharacteristically tender and offers his support.

Novarro then has a miserable time on the set of Ben-Hur. The director calls him a “stupid Mexican.” Novarro is almost killed filming the chariot race and is shown to have large bruises up and down one side of his body. Howe becomes infuriated and Novarro is desperate to leave and see Ingram. Howe agrees to assist in his boyfriend’s escape. Production on the film shuts down immediately and Mayer becomes infuriated while Thalberg becomes panicked. Novarro and Howe show up and Rex Ingram’s house for cover. Thalberg is able to convince the pair to return to the film set, giving increased power to Novarro.

Unfortunately, an article written by an anonymous author has revealed the relationship and exposed their romantic entanglement, threatening to end Novarro’s career. Quirk informs Howe that Mayer wants to see him at MGM studios and the two of them arrive in the movie mogul’s office. Quirk defends his star reporter, but Mayer grows furious and demands an end to their relationship. Thalberg agrees to let Howe end it his own way, which the reporter reluctantly does. One of the final scenes shows Novarro telling Alice Terry that he was going to break up with Howe as well.

Back in his office, Howe concludes that Terry wrote the article in order to get his job. He compliments her on her style, and says that he needs to get out of the business. The final scene shows all the characters reading excerpts from Howe’s articles on Novarro.

== Original production ==
The original production of Through a Naked Lens opened on December 16, 2005 at the Wings Theatre and ran for 28 performances. It closed on January 21, 2006. The direction was by L.J. Kleeman and Richard Bacon with costumes by L.J. Kleeman, sets by L.J. Kleeman and Ray Wagner, lighting by Sean Linehan, and multi-media effects by Jas McDonald and Richard Bacon. The production stage manager was Parys Le Bron. The opening night cast was as follows:

- Stephen Smith as Herbert Howe
- JoHary Ramos as Ramón Novarro
- Richard Bacon as Rex Ingram
- Shay Coleman as Jim Quirk
- Tracy M. Gaillard as Tracy
- Heather Murdock as Alice Terry
- Tom Patterson as Irving G. Thalberg
- Joe Pepe as Eason and Lon
- Sheila Shaigany as Reba and Sally
- Laura Beth Wells as Adela Rogers St. Johns
- Raymond O. Wagner as Louis B. Mayer

== Critical reception ==
The play opened to mixed reviews with some publications declaring the new play “compelling” and others saying it was concerned more with image than content. The play ran for little over a month and was considered a moderate success at the box office.

== See also ==
- Ramón Novarro
- Louis B. Mayer
- Irving Thalberg
- Rex Ingram
- Photoplay
