= Herbert Howe =

Herbert Howe may refer to:

- Herbert Howe (journalist), Hollywood news writer
- Herbert Alonzo Howe, American astronomer and educator
- S. Herbert Howe, Massachusetts businessman and politician
