= The Barbarian (1933 film) =

1933 film

- Theatrical release poster with alternate title
- Directed by: Sam Wood
- Written by: Elmer Harris; Anita Loos
- Based on: The Arab; 1915 film by Edgar Selwyn
- Produced by: Sam Wood; Bernard H. Hyman
- Starring: Ramon Novarro; Myrna Loy; Reginald Denny
- Cinematography: Harold Rosson
- Edited by: Tom Held
- Music by: Herbert Stothart
- Production company: Metro-Goldwyn-Mayer
- Distributed by: Loew's Inc.
- Release date: May 12, 1933 (USA)
- Running time: 83 minutes
- Country: United States
- Language: English

The Barbarian, also known as A Night in Cairo, is a 1933 American pre-Code romantic drama film produced and directed by Sam Wood and starring Ramon Novarro and Myrna Loy. Written by Elmer Harris and Anita Loos, and based on the 1911 play The Arab by Edgar Selwyn, the film is about an American woman tourist in Egypt who has several suitors, among them an Arab guide who is more than he seems. The film was released on May 12, 1933 in the United States by Metro-Goldwyn-Mayer. The play had been filmed previously by MGM as The Arab (1924) with Novarro and Alice Terry.

== Plot ==
A beautiful English socialite, Diana Standing, and her wealthy fiancé Gerald Hume arrive at the train station in Cairo, Egypt, where they plan to be married. Although her mother was Egyptian, Diana considers herself part of the British upper class. At the station, she is noticed by Jamil El Shehab, a handsome good-natured Egyptian dragoman who enjoys romancing women tourists and freeing them from some of their jewelry. Jamil is immediately captivated by Diana and soon talks his way into becoming her official guide and driver in Egypt.

While touring the Pyramids, Jamil manages to be alone with Diana and romances her with love songs. Meanwhile, Diana is also being wooed by Pasha Achmed, her fiancé's unscrupulous Egyptian business associate. In order to arrange to be alone with Diana, Pasha persuades Gerald to leave Cairo and inspect the aqueduct they are building together. When Jamil learns of the deception, he blackmails his countryman to remain silent. Later Jamil uses his position as a servant to enter Diana's hotel bedroom, and kisses her in a moment of passion. Although she briefly returns his kiss, Diana angrily fires him.

Soon after, she and Gerald set out on a caravan across the desert with a new guide. Undaunted by Diana's rejection, Jamil follows and soon replaces the new guide. That night, Jamil's romantic singing has its effect on Diana, who is drawn into his arms again. When she realizes what is happening, she becomes outraged and strikes Jamil with a whip. On their way back to Cairo, however, Jamil sends the rest of the caravan on one route and tricks Diana into riding to Pasha's oasis retreat, where she is treated like royalty. When Pasha arrives, Jamil lies to him, telling him that Diana paid him to bring her to Pasha. When Pasha forces himself on her, she cries out for Jamil to save her, which he does, and the two ride off together in the night.

The next day, Pasha's guards catch up to them in the desert, and in the ensuing fight, Jamil kills them all. Left with only one horse, Jamil forces Diana to walk behind him while he rides the horse across the desert. At a desert pool, he forces her to wait while he and the horse drink first. That night, weakened by thirst, hunger, and humiliation, Diana is raped by Jamil. The next day, he takes her to his tribal village, where he reveals his true identity as a prince who worked as a humble dragoman as part of his royal training. When he proposes marriage to her, Diana passively accepts. Later at the ceremony, however, she tosses the ceremonial marriage water in his face, humiliating him in front of his father and his tribe. Devastated by her rejection, Jamil provides her an escort to return safely to Cairo.

After she returns, Diana recounts her story of captivity, and the army is dispatched to arrest Jamil. As Diana proceeds with her wedding plans, Jamil remains at large. Diana's prospective mother-in-law worries that his capture will result in a scandalous rape charge, but she is assured that the charge of piracy alone will carry a death sentence. Just before the wedding ceremony, the fugitive Jamil returns to her room to sing his romantic song of love to her one last time, placing his life in Diana's hands and offering his death as a wedding gift if she rejects him again. Realizing that she truly loves him, Diana rides off with Jamil. Sometime later, Diana cradles Jamil in her arms as they float down the Nile together on a boat. When Diana quietly reveals that her mother was an Egyptian, he assures her that he would love her no matter what her background.

== Cast ==
- Ramon Novarro as Jamil El Shehab
- Myrna Loy as Diana Standing
- Reginald Denny as Gerald Hume, Diana's fiancé
- Louise Closser Hale as Powers
- C. Aubrey Smith as Cecil Harwood
- Edward Arnold as Achmed Pasha
- Blanche Friderici as Mrs. Hume
- Marcelle Corday as Marthe
- Hedda Hopper as Mrs. Loway
- Leni Stengel as Ilsa
- Akim Tamiroff as Colonel (uncredited)
