= Dorothy Janis =

American actress (1912–2010)

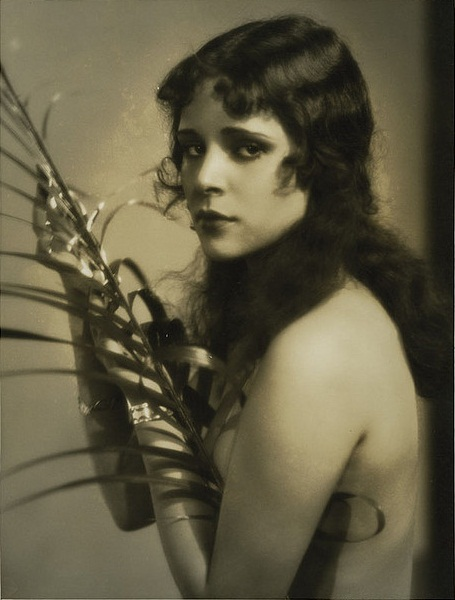
- Dorothy Janis in 1929 by Ruth Harriet Louise
- Born: Dorothy Penelope Jones; February 19, 1912; Dallas, Texas, U.S.
- Died: March 10, 2010 (aged 98); Paradise Valley, Arizona, U.S.
- Occupation: Actress
- Years active: 1925–1930
- Spouse: Wayne King (m. 1932; died 1985)
- Children: 2

Dorothy Janis (born Dorothy Penelope Jones, February 19, 1912 – March 10, 2010) was an American actress.

== Early life ==
Dorothy Penelope Jones was born in Dallas, Texas on February 19, 1912. Her short film career began when she was visiting a cousin, who was working on a film for Fox Film Corporation in 1927. Her beauty was noticed at once and she was asked to make a screen test. Janis went on to make six films: five silents and one talkie.

== Film career ==
Janis' only talkie film was Lummox (1930) based on the Fannie Hurst novel. This film, released by United Artists, now only exists as a single nitrate print at the British Film Institute. Janis was best known for playing opposite Ramon Novarro in the MGM film The Pagan (1929), for which MGM publicity portrayed her as half-Cherokee. The Pagan, directed by W. S. Van Dyke, was a part-sound film, with music and sound effects only, and featured "Pagan Love Song" on the soundtrack.

== Personal life and death ==
Janis was married to tenor Allan Prior in the 1920s. She retired in 1930 and married a second time to bandleader Wayne King in 1932. The vice president of the Music Corporation of America, W. H. Stein, was best man. Janis and King were married for 53 years, until King's death in 1985. She lived in Paradise Valley, Arizona, from 2004 until her death on March 10, 2010, at the age of 98. She was one of the last survivors of the silent screen era. She had a son, Wayne, and a daughter, Penny Pape. She was interred in the All Saints Episcopal Church Cemetery in Phoenix, Arizona.

== Selected filmography ==
- Camille of the Barbary Coast (1925)
- Kit Carson (Paramount Pictures, 1928)
- Fleetwing (Fox Film Corporation, 1928)
- The Overland Telegraph (Metro-Goldwyn-Mayer. 1929)
- The Pagan (MGM, 1929)
- Lummox (United Artists, 1930)
