= The Arab (1915 film) =

1915 film

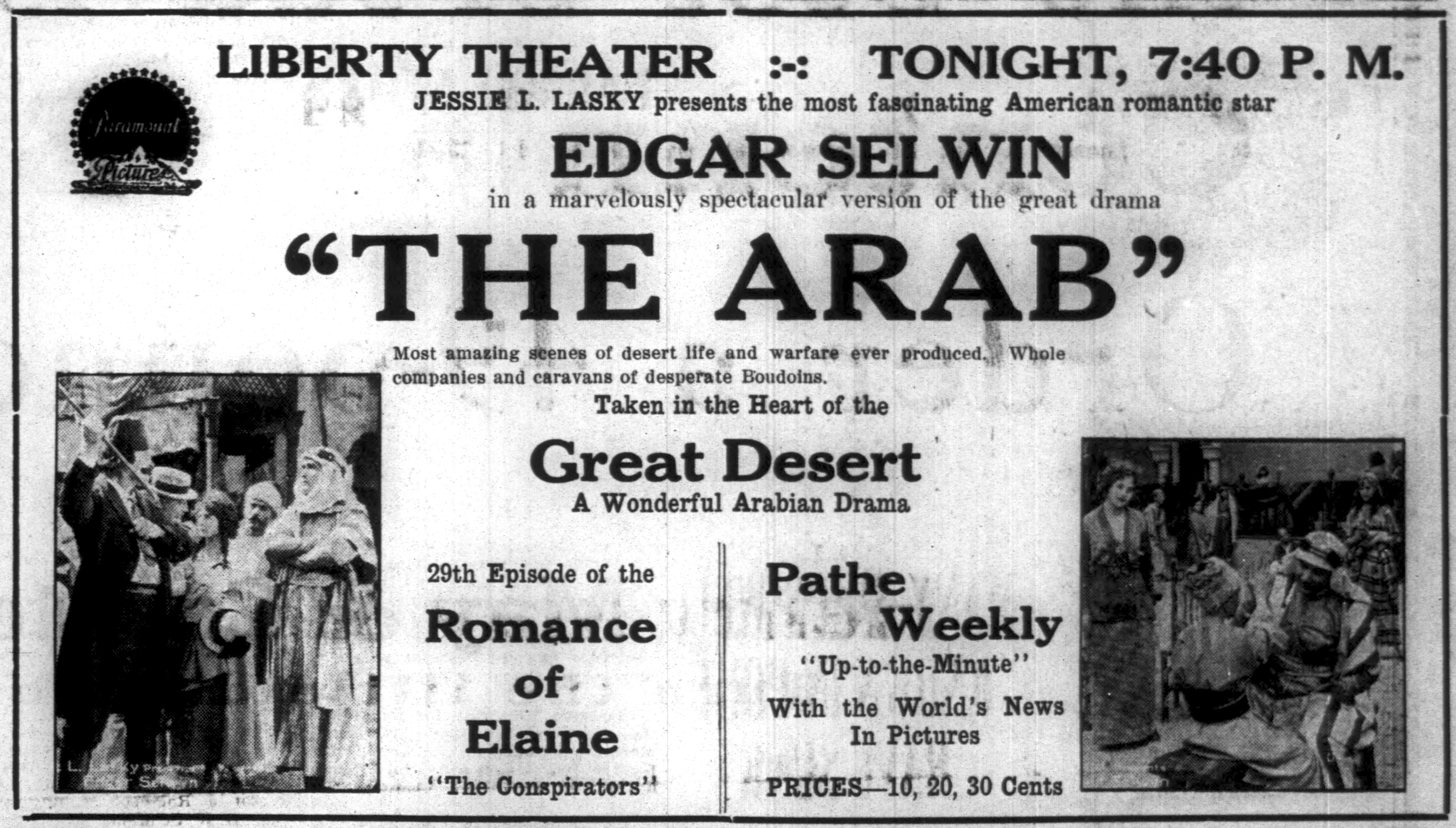
- Newspaper advertisement.
- Directed by: Cecil B. DeMille
- Written by: Edgar Selwyn
- Based on: The Arab (play) by Edgar Selwyn
- Produced by: Jesse L. Lasky
- Starring: Edgar Selwyn
- Cinematography: Alvin Wyckoff
- Edited by: Cecil B. DeMille
- Production company: Jesse Lasky Feature Plays
- Distributed by: Paramount Pictures
- Release date: June 14, 1915
- Running time: 5 reels
- Country: United States
- Language: Silent (English intertitles)
- Budget: $18,327
- Box office: $68,526

The Arab is a 1915 American silent adventure film directed by Cecil B. DeMille. Edgar Selwyn wrote and starred in the Broadway play version of the story in 1911, and this film is based on that play. Selwyn reprises his role from his play. This film was refilmed by Metro Pictures in 1924 as The Arab.

== Cast ==
- Edgar Selwyn as Jamil
- Horace B. Carpenter as The Sheik
- Milton Brown as Abdullah
- William Elmer as Meshur (as Billy Elmer)
- Sydney Deane as Dr. Hilbert
- Gertrude Robinson as Mary Hilbert
- J. Parks Jones as Ibrahim (as Park Jones)
- Theodore Roberts as Turkish Governor
- Raymond Hatton as Mysterious Messenger
- Irvin S. Cobb as American Tourist
- Marjorie Daw as Village Girl
