= Samuel-Novarro House =

Apartment building in Hollywood, California. U.S.

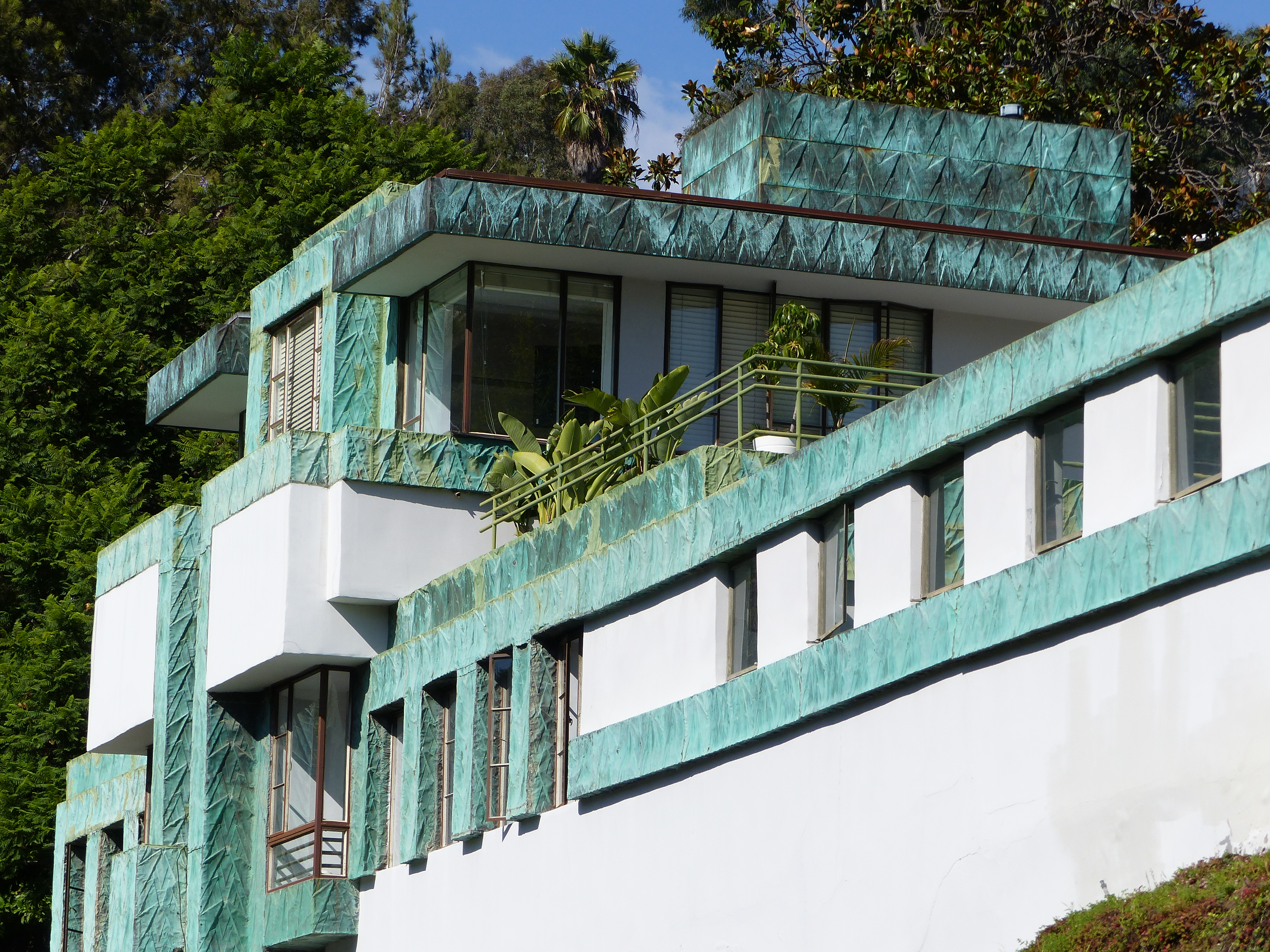
- Samuel-Novarro House west facade
- Interactive map of the Samuel-Novarro House area

General information
- Type: Single-family detached house
- Architectural style: Art Deco
- Location: 5609 Valley Oak Drive, Los Feliz, Los Angeles, California, U.S.
- Coordinates: 34°06′40″N 118°18′43″W
- Completed: 1928 (98 years ago)
- Governing body: Private

Design and construction
- Architect: Lloyd Wright

Los Angeles Historic-Cultural Monument
- Designated: July 17, 1974
- Reference no.: 130

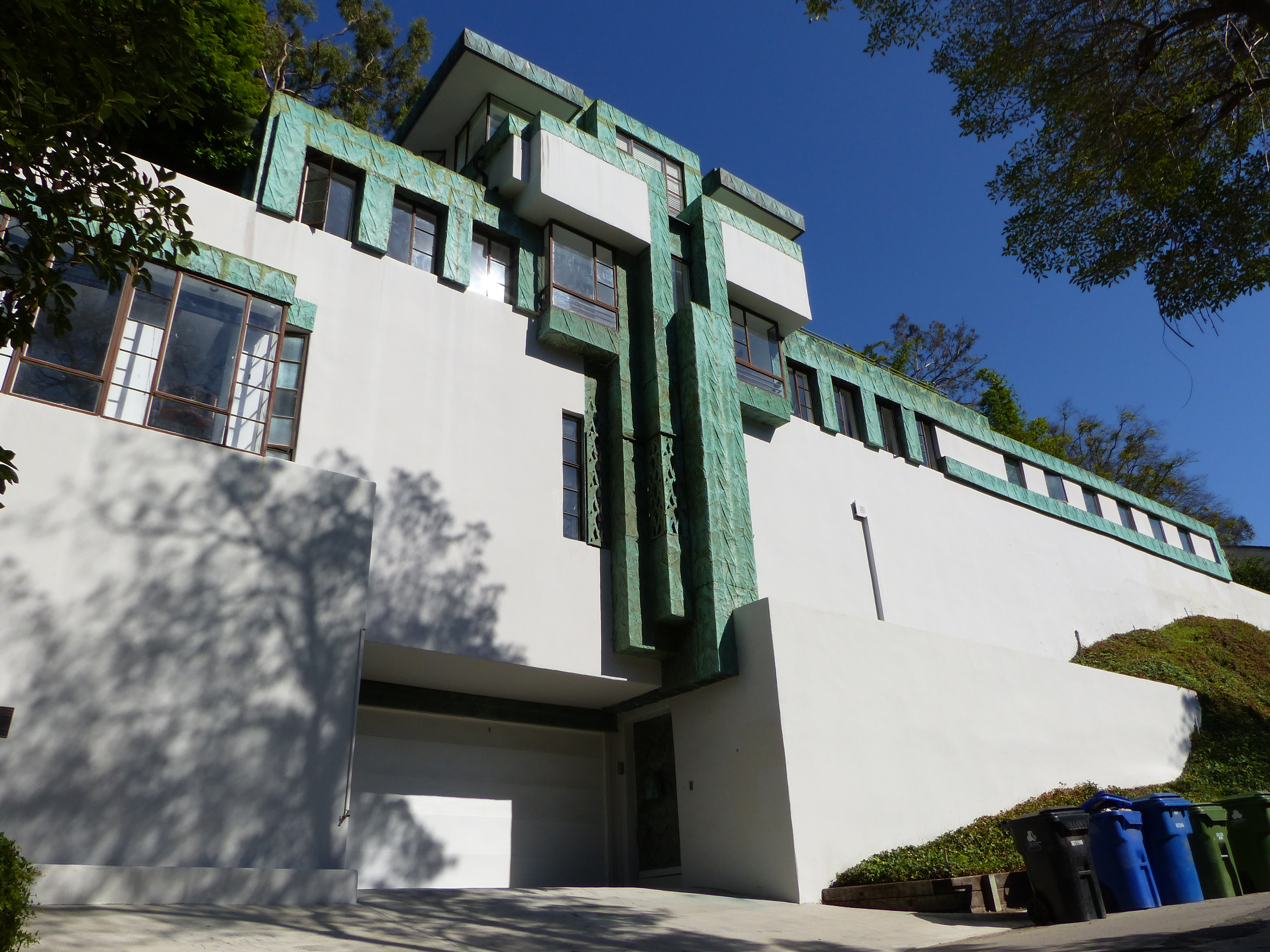
Samuel-Novarro House west facade

Samuel-Novarro House, also known as the Samuel-Novarro Residence, is a historic Mayan Revival single-family dwelling designed by Lloyd Wright in 1928. It is located at 5609 Valley Oak Drive in the Los Feliz neighborhood of Los Angeles. It is Los Angeles Historic-Cultural Monument #130.

== History ==
Lloyd Wright designed the 2,700-square-foot, three-bedroom, three-bathroom home for Ramon Novarro's manager, Louis Samuel, in 1928 on a 13,267-square-foot hillside lot. When Novarro discovered that Samuel had embezzled funds from him in order to pay for the house, Novarro assumed ownership of it in 1931.

Navarro lived there until the late 1930s; in his tenure there, he commissioned Wright to expand the interior as well as the garden, adding a bedroom, music room, and bedroom suite. He also conscripted art director Cedric Gibbons to design the interiors in an Art Deco style.

After Novarro vacated, a number of other Hollywood elite occupied the space, including Leonard Bernstein, Jerome Robbins, Betty Comden, and Adolph Green, who rented the home together in 1944 while working on the musical play On the Town. Later, restaurateur Michael Chow, producer Charles D. Kasher, and actress Diane Keaton, as well as actress Christina Ricci along with boyfriend actor Adam Goldberg, lived in the house; Keaton purchased the home for $1.5 million in 1988, extensively renovating it and/or restoring it per architect Josh Schweitzer, and eventually selling it in the mid-1990s.

In 2005, Ricci purchased the home for $2.979 million, only to sell it a year later for approximately $2,827,500 after she and Goldberg split.

In 2014, the home was sold for $3.8 million, then listed again in 2016 for $4,295,000.

In 2019, the residence was on the market once more, with an asking price of $4.3 million.
