= Lloyd Wright =

American architect (1890–1978)

- c. 1910
- Born: Frank Lloyd Wright Jr. March 31, 1890; Oak Park, Illinois, U.S.
- Died: May 31, 1978 (aged 88); Santa Monica, California, U.S.
- Occupation: Architect
- Spouses: Kyra Markham (m. 1916; div. 1922) Helen Taggart Pole (m. 1926; died 1977)
- Children: Eric Lloyd Wright
- Parent(s): Frank Lloyd Wright; Catherine Lee Tobin
- Buildings: Taggart House, Oasis Hotel, John Sowden House, Lloyd Wright Home and Studio, Samuel-Novarro House, Joshua Tree Retreat Center, Wayfarers Chapel
- Projects: Millard House landscaping and studio, Hollyhock House renovation
- Design: Hollywood Bowl (1926–1928)

Frank Lloyd Wright Jr. (March 31, 1890 – May 31, 1978) was an American architect, active primarily in Los Angeles and Southern California. He was a landscape architect for various Los Angeles projects (1922–1924), provided the shells for the Hollywood Bowl (1926–1928), and produced the Swedenborg Memorial Chapel (or Wayfarers Chapel) in Rancho Palos Verdes, California (1946–1971). Although Wright designed many buildings during his lifetime, his career was largely overshadowed by that of his more famous father, Frank Lloyd Wright.

== Early years ==
Born on March 31, 1890, Frank Lloyd Wright Jr. was the eldest son of renowned architect Frank Lloyd Wright and Wright's first wife, Catherine Lee "Kitty" Tobin Wright. He spent his early years at his father's home and studio in Oak Park, Illinois. Wright briefly attended the University of Wisconsin in Madison for two years of coursework in agronomy and engineering before traveling extensively through Europe after his father moved to Italy in 1909.

In 1911, Wright joined the landscape firm Olmsted and Olmsted in Boston, Massachusetts, where he specialized in botany and horticulture. Wright was later sent to San Diego, California, to assist with the landscape design of the 1915 Panama–California Exposition with architects Bertram Goodhue, Carleton Winslow, and Irving Gill. The exposition's principal buildings and gardens still remain in Balboa Park. Landscape design led him to work with Los Angeles architect William J. Dodd, and in San Diego with Irving Gill, the latter another master architect and mentor to his design career. In the mid-1910s, Wright formed a landscape partnership with Paul Thiene, a colleague from the Olmsted firm, before opening his own practice in 1916. Beginning in 1919, his father, working in Japan on the Imperial Hotel, delegated some of the responsibilities to him and architect Rudolf Schindler to supervise construction of the Hollyhock House, while Wright worked on the Imperial Hotel in Japan. The house was commissioned by the oil heiress and philanthropist Aline Barnsdall.

Wright began his independent career in 1920. In 1922, he was a production designer at Paramount Studios, responsible for the extensive castle and 12th-century village sets for the Douglas Fairbanks version of Robin Hood. In December 1922, Wright prepared plans for the Henry Bollman House in Hollywood that included a repeated pattern of concrete blocks, a precursor to his father's more famous "textile block" houses in the Los Angeles area. From 1923 through 1926, the younger Wright was drawn into the realization of these four houses, and the ambitious attempt to evolve the "textile block" system into a patented construction technique. The first was the 1923 Millard House in Pasadena, California, where Lloyd designed the grounds, and contributed an adjacent studio building in 1926. Lloyd served as construction manager for the other three: the Storer House (1923), the Samuel Freeman House (1923), and the Ennis House (1924). By all accounts Lloyd's work was difficult as he shuttled back and forth between sites, communicating with his father via telegram, and receiving little constructive support from Taliesin.

== Independent work ==
Wright designed and built a number of houses in the Hollywood and Los Feliz districts of Los Angeles in the mid- to late 1920s. Lloyd Wright's first residential commission, the Taggart House, was built for the mother of his second wife, Helen Taggart, a registered Los Angeles Historic-Cultural Monument located next to the city's Griffith Park. Another significant project was the hillside house for the manager of film star Ramón Novarro, and then a renovation and enlargement when Novarro himself acquired the residence. He also designed and built his own home with a ground floor studio and second floor residence, using concrete blocks, in West Hollywood in the 1920s.

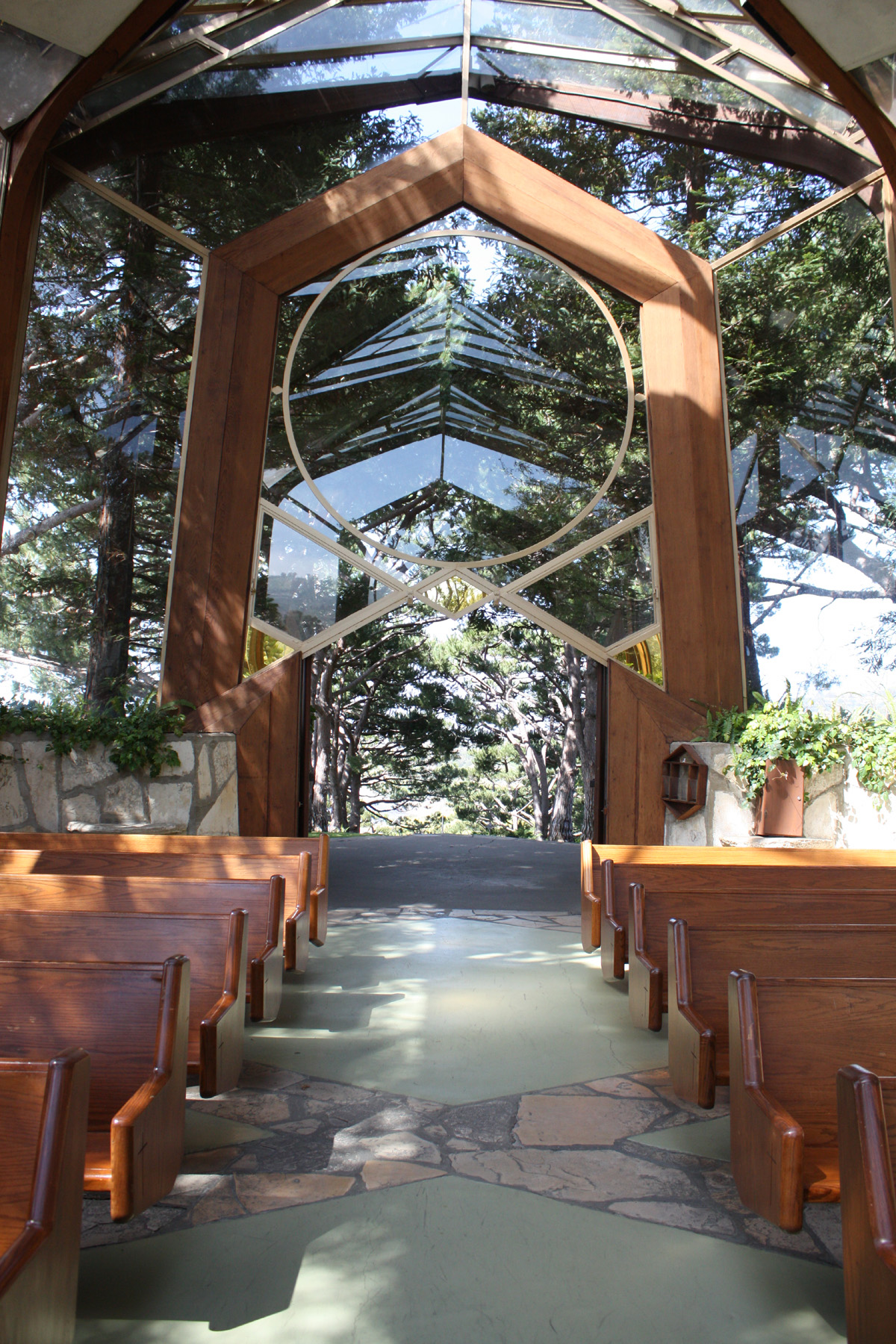
Wayfarers Chapel on the coast at Rancho Palos Verdes, 1951

He also designed the second and third band shells at the Hollywood Bowl. The original 1926 shell, designed by the Allied Architects group, was considered unacceptable both visually and acoustically. Wright's 1927 shell had a pyramidal shape and a design reminiscent of southwest Native American architecture. According to Charles Willard Moore, it was built from leftovers from the Robin Hood production. Its acoustics generally were regarded as the best of any shell in Bowl history. But its appearance was considered too avant-garde, or perhaps only ugly, and it was demolished at the end of the season. His 1928 wooden shell had the now-familiar concentric ring motif, covered a 120-degree arc, and was designed to be easily dismantled. It was neglected and ruined by water damage, making way for the 1929 Allied Architects shell, which stood until the end of the 2003 season.

In 1927, Wright built a residence for himself, made of two units – one for living and one for work. The 2,413 square feet (224.17 square meter) of living space has an upstairs residence with a living room, a fireplace and wooden floors. Interlocking blocks with a stylized Joshua tree design overlay some of the windows. The Great Depression stalled Wright's firm as he was reaching his artistic and professional peak. As for many architects, remodellings, rather than total designs, were the scope of 1930s work. His post-war designs became more expressionistic and less aligned to previous modernist architectural themes. He also promoted the word Usonia.

The largest collection of Lloyd Wright buildings in the United States was built in phases (1946–1957) for the Institute of Mentalphysics, located on a large Mojave Desert site next to the town of Joshua Tree, to the east of Joshua Tree National Park.

== Later work ==
His best-known project is the Wayfarers Chapel, also known as "The Glass Church", an indoor/outdoor structure made almost entirely of glass and built in 1951 for the Swedenborgian church, overlooking the Pacific Ocean on the Palos Verdes Peninsula. The site planning and planting design express his talent and experience as a landscape architect. He had an embracing grove of Redwoods (Sequoia sempervirens) planted to achieve this. The Wayfarer's Chapel is listed in the National Register of Historic Places.

When the trees that surround the Chapel grow up, they will become the framework, become a part of the tree forms and branches that inevitably arise from the growing trees adjacent to it. I used the glass so that the natural growth, the sky, and sea beyond became the definition of their environment. This is done to give the congregation protection in services and at the same time to create the sense of outer as well as inner space.

Among his last projects was the 1963 John P. Bowler house, known as the "Bird of Paradise" House, in Rancho Palos Verdes using blue fiberglass for projecting roof fins, and the master plan and building designs for a 1970 shopping center in Huntington Beach, at Warner and Springdale streets south of Long Beach. Next to the Huntington Beach shopping center, Wright had designed a 94-foot-tall (29 m) tower; local opposition caused the tower's cancellation.

== Personal life ==
In 1916 Wright married the actress and artist Elaine Hyman (known as Kyra Markham). They divorced in 1922.

The following year, Wright married Helen Taggart, the daughter of a client; her then seven-year-old son, Rupert Pole, would later marry Anaïs Nin. In 1929, Lloyd and Helen's son Eric Lloyd Wright was born; Eric himself would become an architect, who consulted on the restoration of many of his father's and grandfather's works, as well as designing his own works. Lloyd Wright died in 1978 in Santa Monica, California. A comprehensive monograph on Lloyd Wright and his work, "Lloyd Wright, the Architecture of Frank Lloyd Wright Jr.", has extensive vintage and contemporary photographic documentation of his projects.

== Selected works ==
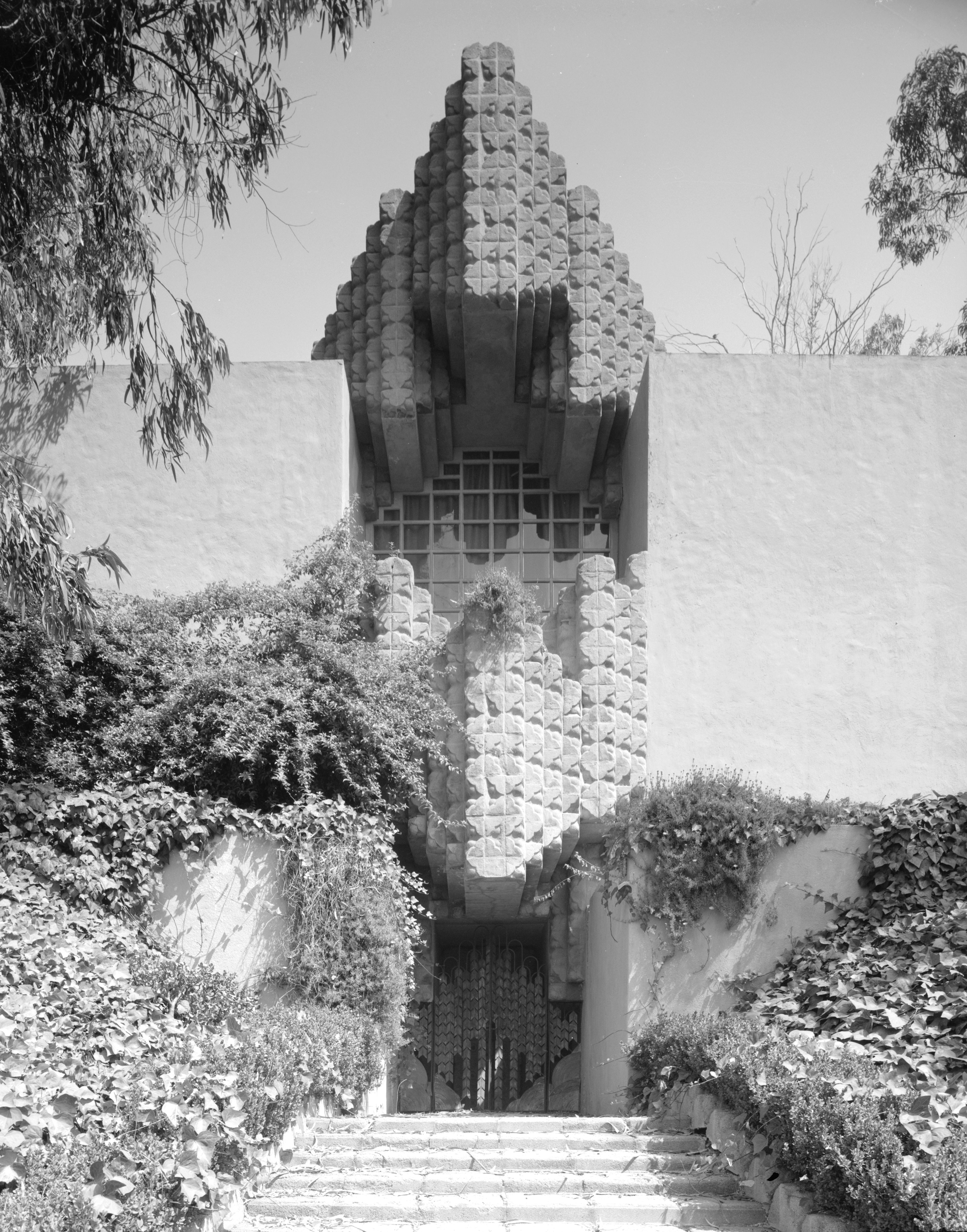
Vintage image of the Sowden House

- 1921, William Weber House, 3923 West 9th Street, Los Angeles, California
- 1922, Otto Bollman House, 2200 Broadview Terrace, Hollywood, Los Angeles, California
- 1922–1924, Martha Taggart House, 5423 Black Oak Drive, Los Feliz, Los Angeles, California
- 1923, Henry Bollman House, 1530 N. Ogden Drive, Hollywood, Los Angeles, California
- 1923, landscape design for Millard House, 645 Prospect Crescent, Pasadena, California
- 1923–1925, Oasis Hotel, 139 South Palm Canyon Drive, Palm Springs, California (partially razed)
- 1925, Harry and Alice Carr House, 3202 Lowry Road, Los Feliz, Los Angeles, California
- 1925, Herbert Howe House, 513 Roxbury Drive, Beverly Hills, California
- 1926, John Sowden House, 5121 Franklin Avenue Los Angeles, California
- 1926, Millard House Studio, 645 Prospect Crescent, Pasadena, California
- 1926, Farrell House, 3209 Lowry Road, Los Feliz, Los Angeles, California
- 1927, Lloyd Wright Home and Studio, 858 North Doheny Drive, West Hollywood, Los Angeles, California
- 1928, Samuel-Novarro House, 2255 Verde Oak Drive, Los Angeles, California
- 1926–1928, Hollywood Bowl Shells, 2301 North Highland Avenue, Hollywood Hills, Los Angeles, California (destroyed)
- 1935, Claudette Colbert residence, 615 North Faring Road, Beverly Hills (razed)
- 1942, Ramona Gardens, Boyle Heights, Los Angeles, California (with others)
- 1946, renovation of the Hollyhock House, 4800 Hollywood Boulevard, East Hollywood, Los Angeles, California
- 1946–1957, Joshua Tree Retreat Center, 59700 Twentynine Palms Highway, Joshua Tree, California
- 1948, Jascha Heifetz House and Teaching Studio, Beverly Hills, California the studio reconstructed as part of the Colburn School in downtown Los Angeles
- 1949, Dorland House, 1370 Mirada Place, Altadena, California
- 1951, Wayfarers Chapel, 5755 Palos Verdes Drive South, Rancho Palos Verdes, California
- 1951, Swedenborgian Church, El Cerrito, California
- 1959, Moore House, Palos Verdes Estates, California (demolished, 2012)
- 1967, 7017, 7029, and 7035 Senalda Drive (later the David Lynch Compound), Los Angeles, California

== Bibliography ==
- Weintraub, Alan; Hines, Thomas; and Wright, Eric Lloyd: Lloyd Wright, the Architecture of Frank Lloyd Wright Jr.; United Kingdom publisher: Thames and Hudson, 1998; and United States publisher: Harry N. Abrahms, 1998. 595 illustrations, 275 pages, (ISBN 9780810939967)
