= Kyra Markham =

American actress (1891–1967)

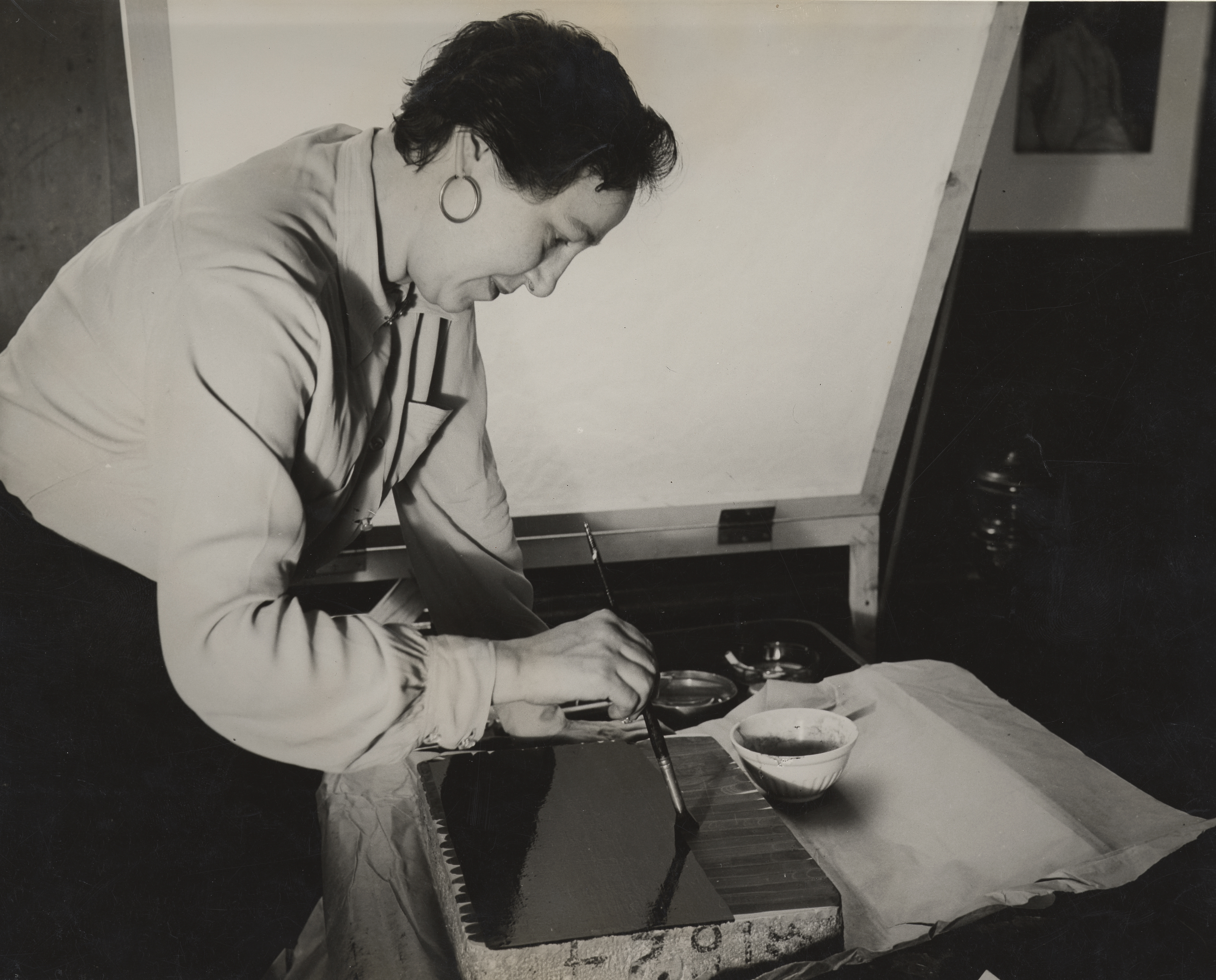
- Markham working on lithographic stone, c. 1937, from the Archives of American Art
- Born: Elaine Hyman; 1891; Chicago, Illinois
- Died: 1967 (aged 75–76); Port-au-Prince, Haiti
- Education: Art Students League
- Known for: Painting, Printmaking, Lithography
- Movement: Realism, Social realism
- Spouses: Lloyd Wright (m. 1916; div. 1922) David Gaither (m. 1927; died 1958)
- Awards: Mary S. Collins Prize, Philadelphia Print Club annual exhibition, 1935

Kyra Markham (born Elaine Hyman, 1891–1967) was an actress, figurative painter and printmaker. Markham was briefly married to the architect Lloyd Wright, and five years later, married the scenographer David Stoner Gaither. She worked for the Federal Art Project, creating works of social realism that documented American life in the 1930s. During World War II, her art was focused on the propaganda effort against the Nazis.

== Biography ==
Markham was born Elaine Hyman in Chicago, Illinois. She studied drawing at the school of the Chicago Art Institute from 1907 to 1909, and subsequently worked as a muralist and printmaker.

In addition to her work as an artist, Markham was an accomplished actress. She appeared with the Chicago Little Theater from 1912 to the 1913. She lived with the author and playwright Theodore Dreiser in Greenwich Village from 1914 to 1916, helping him with his writing, editing, and typing, while also acting with various theater companies. Through Dreiser she became acquainted with H.L Mencken, Edgar Lee Masters, and other writers. Due to Dreiser's womanizing tendencies, Markham left him in 1916 and moved to Los Angeles where she performed with the Los Angeles Little Theatre. During this early stage, Markham also supported herself by making book jackets and illustrations and later working as an art director for film companies like Fox and Metro.

In November 1916 she married the architect Lloyd Wright and briefly had Frank Lloyd Wright as a father-in-law. In 1927, she married David Gaither and collaborated with him on the set design for a children's play, The Forest Ring, staged at the Roerich Museum Theatre in 1930. Gaither encouraged Markham to pursue "her first love, painting." Markham returned to the Art Students League in New York City in 1930, where she studied with Alexander Abels. Before the stock market crash, Markham was a successful bathroom muralist. From the 1920s until the Depression she obtained commercial commissions from clubs and restaurants.

During the 1930s, Markham's artistic career began to gain momentum, regularly winning prizes for her lithographic work. In 1934, Markham organized her first solo exhibition in Ogunquit, Maine, featuring prints, murals and lithographs. Markham created works of social realism depicting street beggars, musicians, actors and scenes from department stores. In recognition of her work, Markham received the prestigious Mary S. Collins Prize at the Philadelphia Print Club's annual exhibition the following year for her lithograph Elin and Maria (1934). Markham sold work to the Whitney Museum of American Art, the Library of Congress and the Metropolitan Museum of Art. From 1935 to 1937, she worked in the Graphic Arts Division of the Federal Art Project, a New Deal program designed to provide employment for artists during the Depression. The Hall of Inventions at the 1939 World's Fair in New York included 40 dioramas by Markham. During World War II she created propaganda satirizing the Nazis and promoting patriotism at home. In 1946 Markham and Gaither moved to an old farmhouse in Halifax, Vermont. Markham stopped making prints after moving to her remote Vermont farm, but continued to work in more accessible mediums such as painting, drawing and ceramics. She was a member of the Southern Vermont Artists Association and participated in their annual exhibitions in Manchester. Over the next twenty years she sold her designs to a postcard company, American Arts, Inc., and had her prints published in prestigious publications. Markham also worked as an illustrator for Children's books during this time.

Markham moved to Port-au-Prince in Haiti as a widow in 1960. She was still enthusiastic for her work, and her later work reflected Markham's new home. While living in Haiti, Markham continued to paint and established a salon for local celebrities, American expatriates, and island visitors. Markham died in Port-au-Prince, Haiti in 1967.

== Work ==
=== Context and themes ===
In the time between the two World Wars, American Scene printmakers, like Markham, opposed the Etching Revival style and instead embraced lithography. During the Great Depression, lithography exploded – the WPA/FAP alone published roughly 240,000 prints from 11,285 original images. Like Markham, many other artists working in this style, such as Mabel Dwight, Reginald Marsh, Elizabeth Olds, Caroline Durieux, and Russell Limbach, used lithography as a vehicle to employ humor and satire of daily life.

Often categorized as social realism, Markham's work presents extracted scenes from everyday life in a dramatic manner, turning the ordinary into the extraordinary. Markham's work explored the incredible and grim aspects of modern society with a strong interest in labor themes, like much of the socially concerned art of the 1930s. This examination of labor roles was especially vital during Depression-era politics, and Markham often expressed this theme through the environment she knew best: theater. A repeated theme in Markham's work, theater is presented in several prints through the unique perspective of the backstage.

Although similar in subject matter to Mabel Dwight's Houston Street Burlesque (1928) and Elizabeth Olds' Burlesque (1939), Markham's Burlycue (1938) differs by focusing on the dancers identities as workers, rather than as objectified figures. Markham emphasizes the dancers confidence, workplace solidarity, and relaxed interactions – allowing viewers to see the Burlesque in a new light and shifting the mood from tantalizing to lighthearted amusement. Although many of her prints depict scenes of entertainment, whether backstage in the dressing room or performing under the spotlight, Markham is also interested in other leisure activities such as attending lively night clubs and social gatherings. A mural she painted for the Community Hall in West Halifax, Vermont depicts a barn-raising. Often evoking a dream-like state, Markham's use of light, combined with detailed realism, results in fantastical compositions of daily life (9). Similarly to Paul Cadmus and George Tooker, Markham injected fantasy into the social realist genre.

== List of works ==
- Nightclub, 1935, lithograph.
- Fisherman's Luck, 1938, lithograph.
- Hotcha, 1938, aquatint.
- Ohmpeer, 1944, lithograph.
- Bleecker Street Fire Hydrant, 1942, lithograph.
- July 4th, 1936, 1936, lithograph.
- Cherry Blossom in Brooklyn, 1937, lithograph.
- The Silver Trumpets of the Rain, 1936, lithograph.
- New Year's Eve in Greenwich Village, 1938, oil on canvas laid on masonite.
- Flag Raising in Leroy Street, 1942, lithograph.
- Mature Vision, 1935, lithograph.
- Stage Door Johnnie, 1937, lithograph.
- Sailors at Penn Station, 1944, lithograph.
- The Fit Yourself Shop, 1935, lithograph.
- The Show is Over, 1936, lithograph.
- At Her Dressing Table, 1939, oil on canvas board.
- Laughing Gas (Theodore Dreiser's Operation), 1943, lithograph.
- Summer Idyll, 1941, aquatint.
- Burlycue, 1936, lithograph.
- Haitian Village Women, 1961, oil on masonite.
- Elin and Maria, 1934, lithograph.
