= The Saint Who Forged a Country =

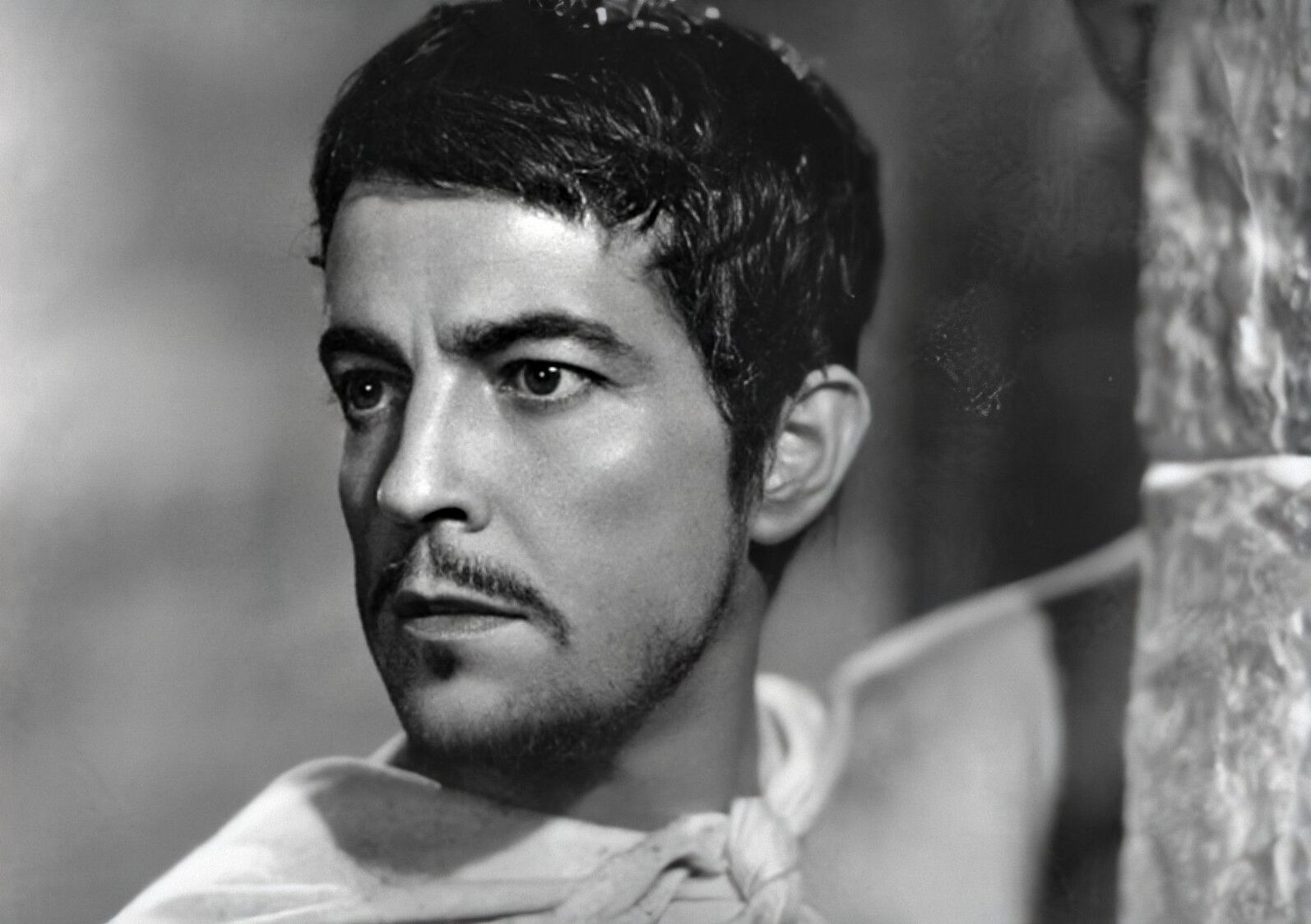
- Ramon Novarro as Juan Diego in the film
- Spanish: La virgen que forjó una patria
- Directed by: Julio Bracho
- Produced by: Agustín J. Fink
- Starring: Ramón Novarro; Domingo Soler; Gloria Marín; Julio Villarreal; Paco Fuentes; Felipe Montoya
- Cinematography: Gabriel Figueroa
- Edited by: Jorge Bustos
- Music by: Miguel Bernal Jiménez
- Production companies: Films Mundiales S.A; Estudios Casa
- Release date: December 11, 1942 (Mexico)
- Running time: 110 minutes
- Country: Mexico
- Language: Spanish

The Saint Who Forged a Country (Spanish: La virgen que forjó una patria) is a 1942 Mexican drama film directed by Julio Bracho and starring Ramon Novarro, Domingo Soler, and Gloria Marín. It was released under the English title in English in 1944. The title refers to the appearances of the Virgin Mary to Juan Diego in colonial Mexico as Our Lady of Guadalupe.
