= Lloyd Wright Home and Studio =

Historic house in West Hollywood, California

- Wright, Lloyd, Home and Studio
- U.S. National Register of Historic Places
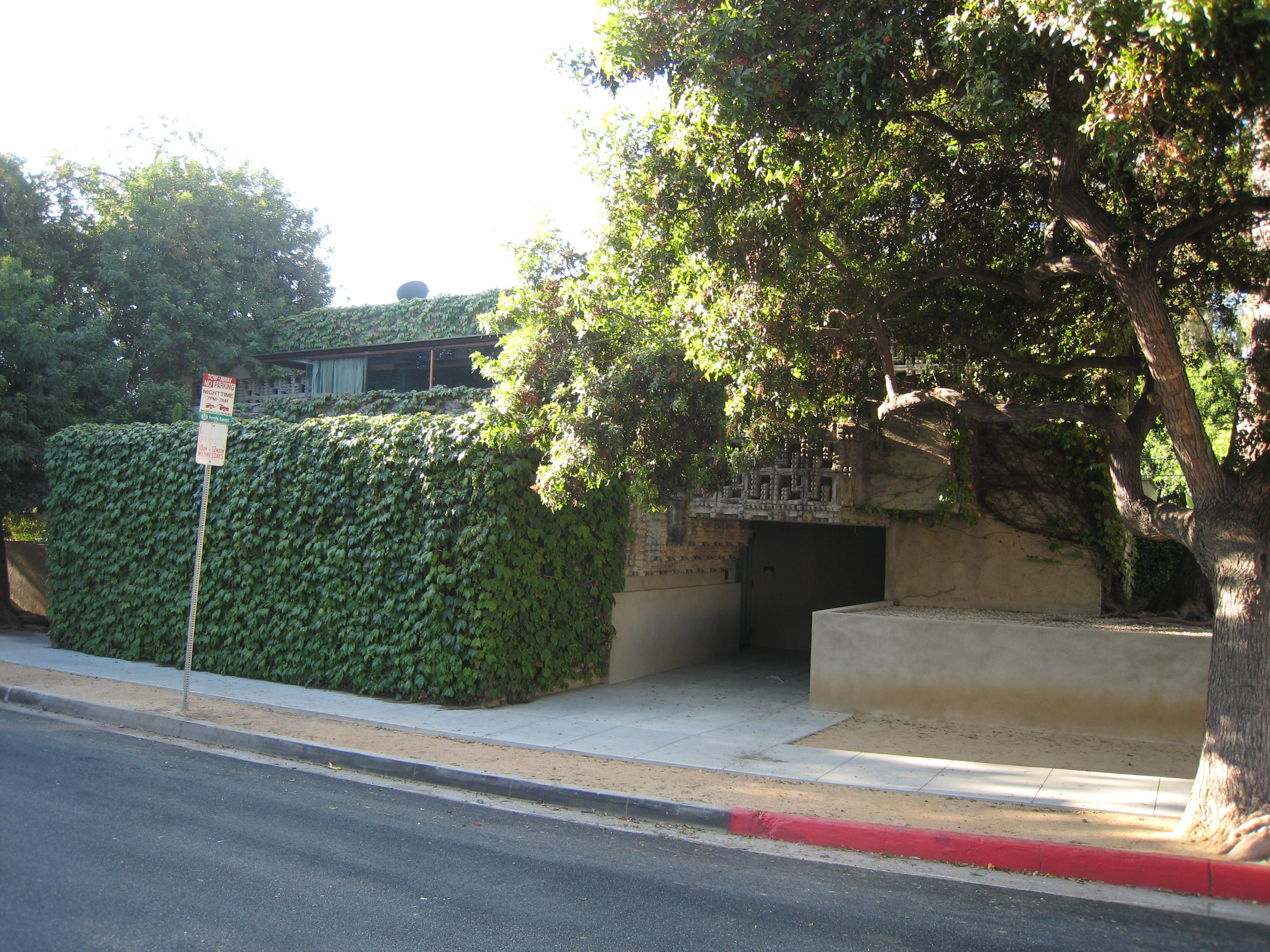
- The Lloyd Wright Home and Studio in 2008

- Location within California
- Location: 858 North Doheny Drive, West Hollywood, California
- Coordinates: 34°5′12″N 118°23′37″W
- Area: 0.1 acres (0.040 ha)
- Built: 1927
- Architect: Lloyd Wright
- NRHP reference No.: 87000562
- Added to NRHP: April 6, 1987

The Lloyd Wright Home and Studio is a historic two-story house in West Hollywood, California, U.S.. It was built in 1927. It was designed by architect Lloyd Wright, the eldest son of Frank Lloyd Wright. It has been listed on the National Register of Historic Places since April 6, 1987.
