= Paul Thiene =

German-born American landscape architect

Paul Thiene (1880–1971) was a German-born American landscape architect.

== Biography ==
=== Early life ===
He was born in Germany in 1880 and emigrated to the United States in 1903.

=== Career ===
He worked with landscape architect Frederick Law Olmsted Jr. (1870-1957) until 1910. Later, he worked on the Panama–California Exposition in San Diego, California with Lloyd Wright, and they collaborated until 1918. Later, he designed landscapes for homes in Southern California, including Santa Barbara, Pasadena, and Beverly Hills. Additionally, he created an 80-foot waterfall on the grounds of the Greystone Mansion in Beverly Hills.

He was a fellow of the American Society of Landscape Architects. He retired in 1951, at the age of seventy-one.

=== Personal life ===
He resided in Pasadena. He died in 1971.
