= Ramon Novarro =

Mexican actor (1899–1968)

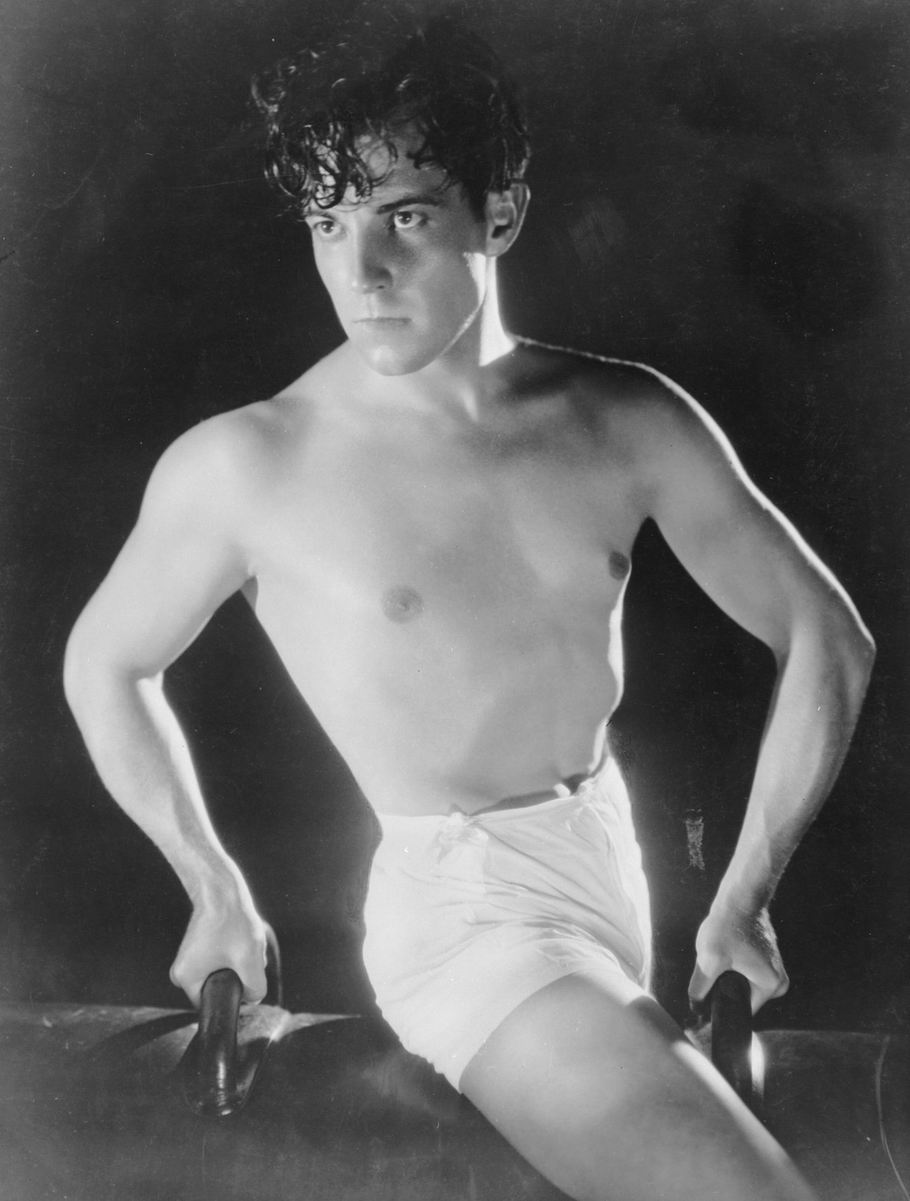
- Novarro, c. 1925
- Born: Ramón Gil Samaniego; February 6, 1899; Durango City, Mexico
- Died: October 30, 1968 (aged 69); North Hollywood, Los Angeles, California, U.S.
- Cause of death: Asphyxiation (murdered)
- Resting place: Calvary Cemetery
- Other names: Ramon Samaniego; Ramón Samaniego; Ramon Samaniegos
- Years active: 1917–1968
- Relatives: Dolores del Río (cousin); Andrea Palma (cousin); Julio Bracho (cousin)
- Awards: Hollywood Walk of Fame (Motion Picture)

Ramón Gil Samaniego (February 6, 1899 – October 30, 1968), known professionally as Ramon Novarro, was a Mexican actor. He began his career in American silent films in 1917 and eventually became a leading man and one of the top box-office attractions of the 1920s and early '30s. Novarro was promoted by MGM as a "Latin lover" and became known as a sex symbol after the death of Rudolph Valentino. He is recognized as the first Latin American actor to succeed in Hollywood.

== Early life ==
Novarro was born Ramón Gil Samaniego on February 6, 1899, in Durango City, Durango, north-west Mexico, to Dr. Mariano N. Samaniego, and his wife, Leonor Pérez Gavilán. The family moved to Los Angeles to escape the Mexican Revolution in 1913. Novarro's direct ancestors came from the Castilian town of Burgos, whence two brothers emigrated to the New World in the seventeenth century.

Allan Ellenberger, Novarro's biographer, writes:

The Samaniegos were an influential and well-respected family in Mexico. Many Samaniegos had prominent positions in the affairs of state and were held in high esteem by the president. Ramon's grandfather, Mariano Samaniego, was a well-known physician in Juarez. Known as a charitable and outgoing man, he was once an interim governor for the State of Chihuahua and was the first city councilman of El Paso, Texas.... Ramon's father, Dr. Mariano N. Samaniego, was born in Juarez and attended high school in Las Cruces, New Mexico. After receiving his degree in dentistry at the University of Pennsylvania, he moved to Durango, Mexico, and began a flourishing dental practice. In 1891 he married Leonor Pérez-Gavilán, the beautiful daughter of a prosperous landowner. The Pérez-Gaviláns were a mixture of Spanish and Aztec blood, and according to local legend, they were descended from Guerrero, a prince of Montezuma.

The family estate was called the "Garden of Eden". Thirteen children were born there: Emilio; Guadalupe; Rosa; Ramón; Leonor; Mariano; Luz; Antonio; José; a stillborn child; Carmen; Ángel and Eduardo. At the time of the Mexican Revolution, the family moved from Durango to Mexico City and then returned to Durango. Three of Ramón's sisters, Guadalupe, Rosa, and Leonor, became nuns. He was a second cousin of the Mexican actresses Dolores del Río and Andrea Palma.

== Career ==
=== Silent films ===
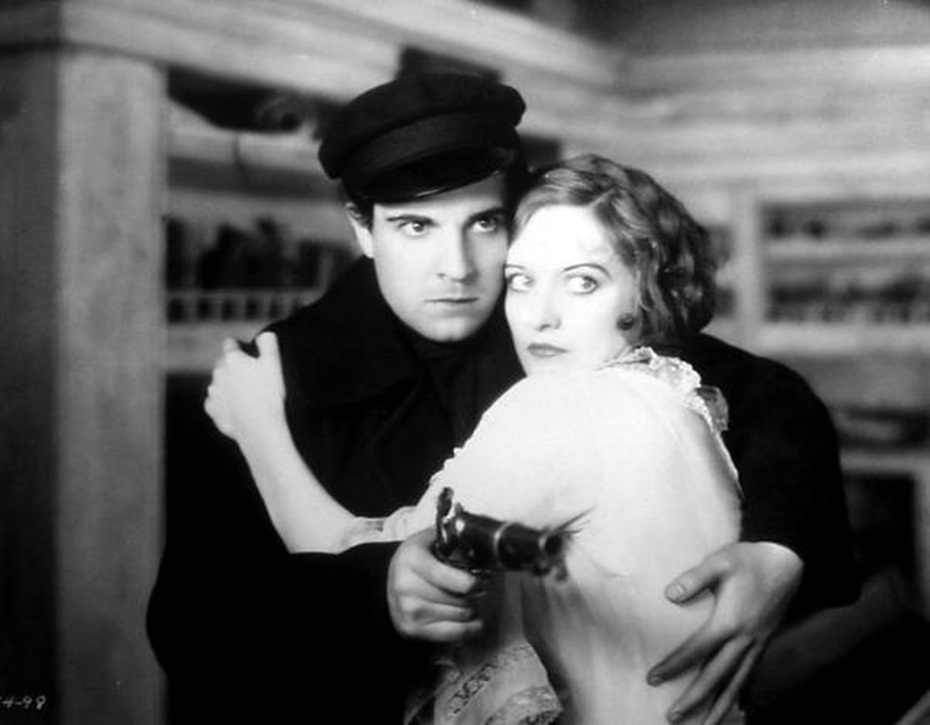
Novarro with Joan Crawford in Across to Singapore (1928)

Novarro began his film career in 1917, playing bit parts, supplementing his income by working as a singing waiter, a taxi dancer and as a dancer in revues choreographed by Ernest Belcher (father of Marge Champion). His friends, actor and director Rex Ingram and his wife, actress Alice Terry, began to promote him as a rival to Rudolph Valentino, and Ingram suggested he change his name to "Novarro". From 1923, he began to play more prominent roles. His role in Scaramouche (1923) brought him his first major success.

Novarro achieved his greatest success in 1925, in Ben-Hur. His revealing costumes caused a sensation. He was elevated into the Hollywood elite. As did many stars, Novarro engaged Sylvia of Hollywood as a physical therapist (although in her tell-all book, Sylvia erroneously claimed that Novarro slept in a coffin). With Valentino's death in 1926, Novarro became the screen's leading Latin actor, though ranked lower than his MGM contemporary John Gilbert as a leading man. Novarro was popular as a swashbuckler in action roles, and considered one of the great romantic lead actors of his day. He appeared with Norma Shearer in The Student Prince in Old Heidelberg (1927) and with Joan Crawford in Across to Singapore (1928).

=== Talking films ===
He made his first talking film, starring as a singing French soldier, in Devil-May-Care (1929). He starred with Dorothy Janis in The Pagan (1929), with Greta Garbo in Mata Hari (1931), with Myrna Loy in The Barbarian (1933) and opposite Lupe Vélez in Laughing Boy (1934).

When his contract with MGM Studios expired in 1935 and the studio did not renew it, Novarro continued to act sporadically, appearing in films for Republic Pictures, a Mexican religious drama, and a French comedy. In January 1936 he even appeared for a week in a variety show at the Birmingham Hippodrome theatre in England, doing a song and dance act with his sister Carmen. In the 1940s, he had several small roles in American films, including We Were Strangers (1949), directed by John Huston and starring Jennifer Jones and John Garfield. In 1958, he was considered for a role in the television series The Green Peacock, with Howard Duff and Ida Lupino, after their CBS Television sitcom Mr. Adams and Eve (1957–58). The project, however, never materialized. A Broadway tryout was aborted in the 1960s. Novarro acted occasionally on television, appearing in NBC's The High Chaparral as late as 1968.

At the peak of his success in the late 1920s and early 1930s, Novarro was earning more than US$100,000 per film. He invested some of his income in real estate, and his Hollywood Hills residence, the Samuel-Novarro House, is one of the more renowned designs (1927) by Lloyd Wright, the son of Frank Lloyd Wright. When his career ended, he was still able to maintain a comfortable lifestyle.

== Personal life ==
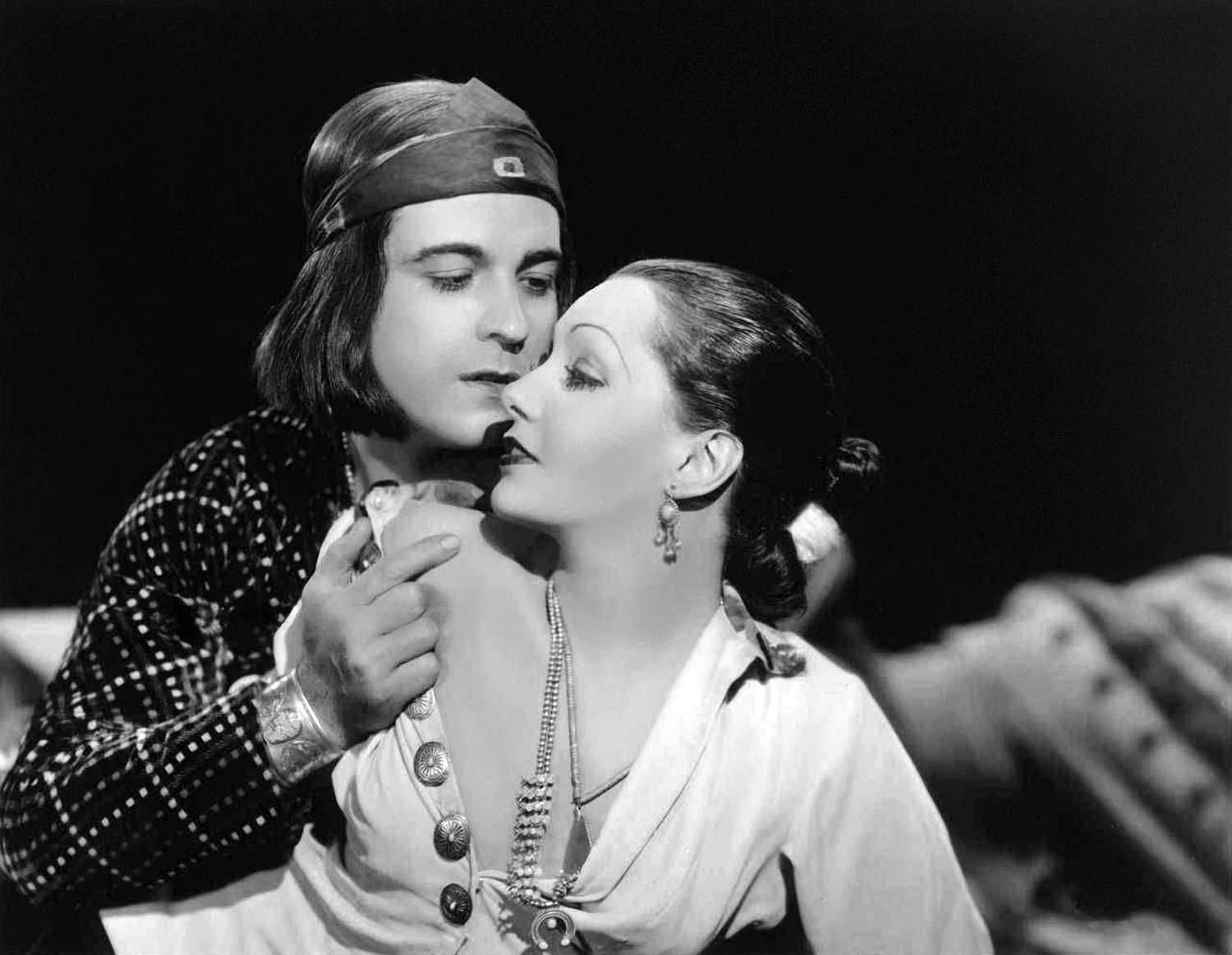
Novarro with Lupe Vélez in Laughing Boy (1934)

In 1925, Novarro purchased a home in "the exclusive West Adams district" of Los Angeles for $12,000 and spent an additional $100,000 on renovations.

Novarro was troubled all his life by his conflicted feelings toward his Roman Catholic faith and his homosexuality. His life-long alcoholism is often traced to these problems. In the early 1920s, Novarro had a romantic relationship with composer Harry Partch, who was working as an usher at the Los Angeles Philharmonic at the time, but Novarro broke off the affair as he achieved greater success as an actor. He was romantically involved with Hollywood journalist Herbert Howe, who was also his publicist in the late 1920s, and with a wealthy philanthropist and arts patron from San Francisco, Noël Sullivan.

== Murder ==
Novarro was murdered on October 30, 1968, by brothers Paul and Tom Ferguson, aged 22 and 17, who called him and offered their sexual services. In the past, he had hired prostitutes from an agency to come to his Laurel Canyon home for sex, and the Fergusons obtained Novarro's telephone number from a previous guest.

According to the prosecution in the murder case, the two young men believed that a large sum of money was hidden in Novarro's house. The prosecution accused the brothers of torturing Novarro for several hours to force him to reveal where the (non-existent) money was hidden. They left the house with $20 they took from his bathrobe pocket. Novarro died as a result of asphyxiation, having choked to death on his own blood after being beaten. The two perpetrators were caught and sentenced to long prison terms, but released on parole in the mid-1970s. Both were later re-arrested for unrelated crimes for which they served longer prison terms than for the murder of Novarro. In a 1998 interview, Paul Ferguson finally assumed the blame for Novarro's death.

Tom Ferguson died by suicide on March 6, 2005. Paul Ferguson died in prison in 2018, while serving out a 60-year sentence for rape in Missouri.

Novarro's death later became the subject of a persistent urban legend sparked by Kenneth Anger's gossip book Hollywood Babylon, which falsely claimed Novarro choked on an Art Deco dildo given to him by Rudolph Valentino. In reality, law enforcement records show no sex toys were ever involved.

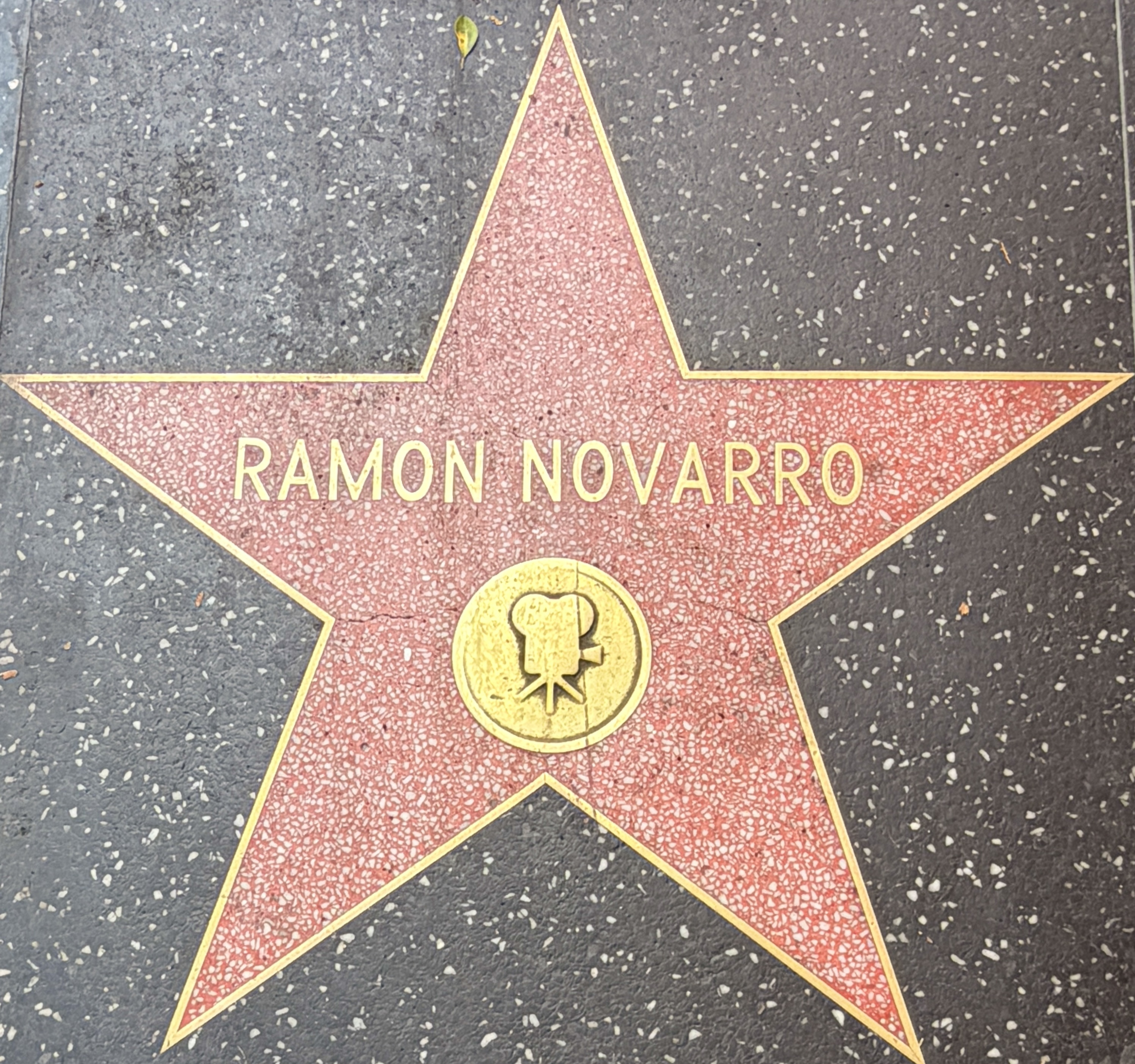
Hollywood Walk of Fame star

Novarro's body is buried in Calvary Cemetery, East Los Angeles, California. His star on the Hollywood Walk of Fame is at 6350 Hollywood Boulevard.

== Legacy ==
Greek playwright Pavlos Matesis wrote a play in two parts titled The Ghost of Mr. Ramon Novarro, which was first staged at the National Theatre of Greece in 1973. In late 2005, the Wings Theatre in New York City staged the world premiere of Through a Naked Lens by George Barthel. The play combined fact and fiction to depict Novarro's rise to fame and his relationship with Hollywood journalist Herbert Howe. The Charles Bukowski short story, "The Murder of Ramon Vasquez," was heavily influenced by the killing of Novarro.

== Filmography ==
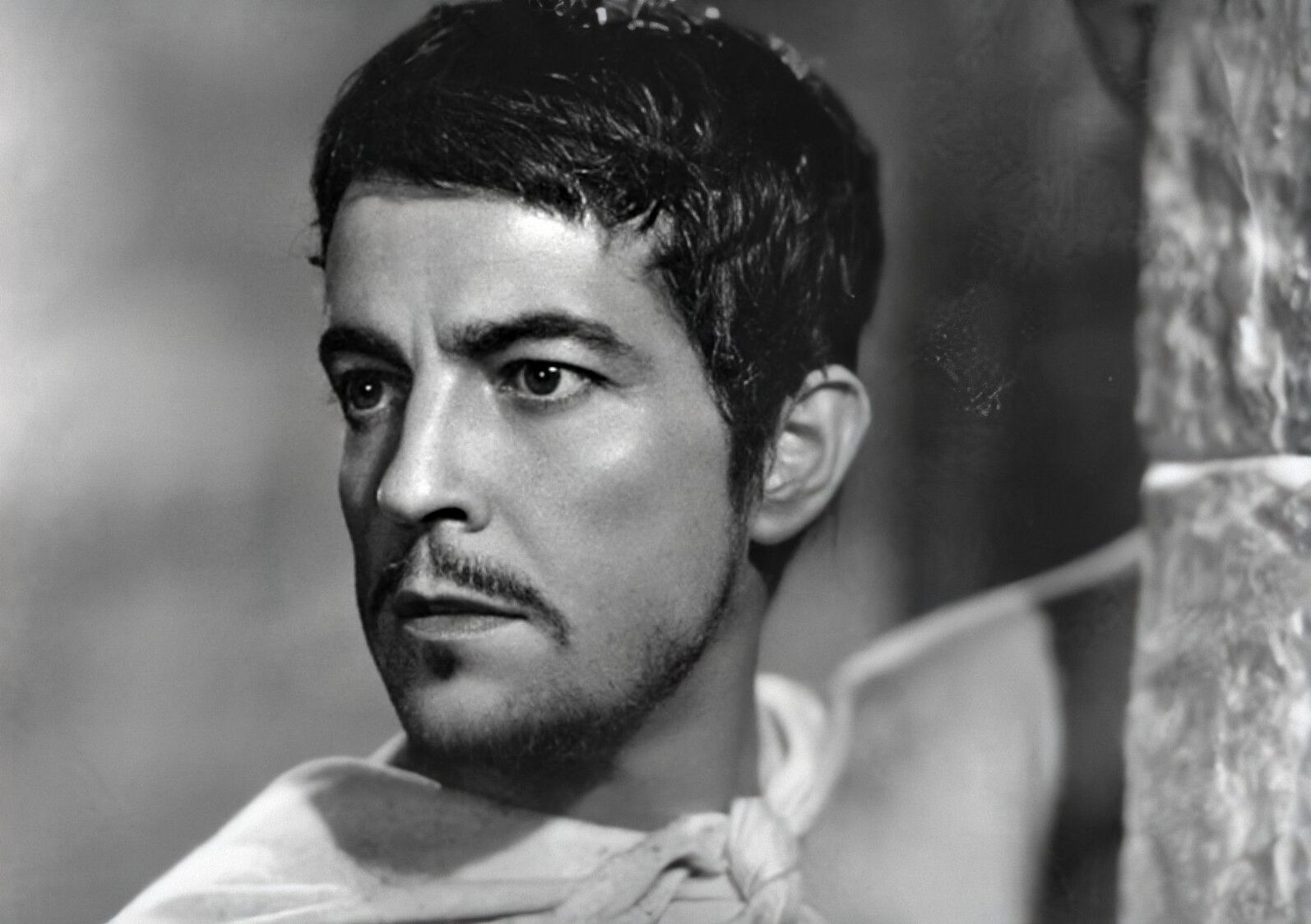
Novarro portraying Catholic saint Juan Diego in The Saint Who Forged a Country (1942)

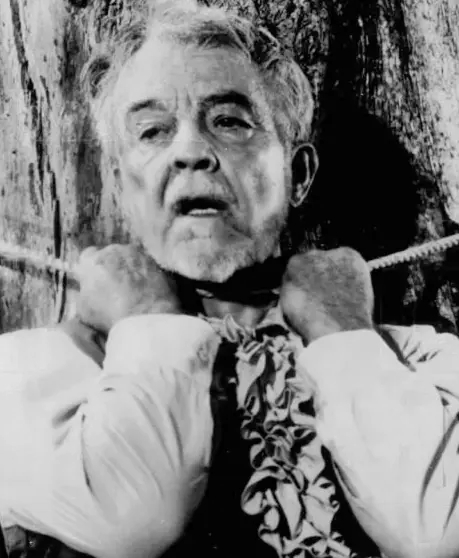
Ramón Novarro in a 1965 episode of Bonanza

Film
Year	Title	Role	Notes
1916	Joan the Woman	Starving Peasant	Uncredited
1917	The Jaguar's Claws	Bandit	Uncredited; Lost film
1917	The Little American	Wounded Soldier	Uncredited
1917	The Hostage		Uncredited; Lost film
1917	The Woman God Forgot	Aztec man	Uncredited
1918	The Goat		Uncredited; Lost film
1921	A Small Town Idol	Dancer	as Ramón Samaniego
1921	The Concert	Dancing shepherd	Uncredited; Lost film
1921	The Four Horsemen of the Apocalypse	Guest at Ball (extra)	Uncredited
1921	Man-Woman-Marriage	Dancer	Uncredited; Lost film
1922	Mr. Barnes of New York	Antonio	as Ramon Samaniego
1922	The Prisoner of Zenda	Rupert of Hentzau	as Ramon Samaniegos
1922	Trifling Women	Henri / Ivan de Maupin	Lost film
1923	Where the Pavement Ends	Motauri	Lost film
1923	Scaramouche	André-Louis Moreau, Quintin's Godson	
1924	Thy Name Is Woman	Juan Ricardo	
1924	The Arab	Jamil Abdullah Azam	
1924	The Red Lily	Jean Leonnec	
1925	A Lover's Oath	Ben Ali	Lost film, but A.M.P.A.S. has 25 feet of this film
1925	The Midshipman	Dick Randall	
1925	Ben-Hur: A Tale of the Christ	Judah Ben-Hur	
1927	Lovers	José	Lost film
1927	The Student Prince in Old Heidelberg	Crown Prince Karl Heinrich	
1927	The Road to Romance	José Armando	
1928	Across to Singapore	Joel Shore	
1928	A Certain Young Man	Lord Gerald Brinsley	Lost film
1928	Forbidden Hours	His Majesty, Michael IV	
1929	The Flying Fleet	Ens. / Ltjg Tommy Winslow	
1929	The Pagan	Henry Shoesmith Jr.	
1929	Devil-May-Care	Armand de Treville	
1930	In Gay Madrid	Ricardo	
1930	The March of Time	Himself	Unfinished film
1930	Call of the Flesh	Juan de Dios	
1930	Sevilla de mis amores	Juan de Dios Carbajal	Spanish version of Call of the Flesh
1931	Le chanteur de Séville	Juan	French version of Call of the Flesh
1931	Daybreak	Willi Kasder	
1931	Son of India	Karim	
1931	Mata Hari	Lt. Alexis Rosanoff	
1931	Wir schalten um auf Hollywood	Himself	
1932	Huddle	Antonio "Tony" Amatto	
1932	The Son-Daughter	Tom Lee / Prince Chun	
1933	The Barbarian	Jamil El Shehab	
1934	The Cat and the Fiddle	Victor Florescu	
1934	Laughing Boy	Laughing Boy	
1935	The Night Is Young	Archduke Paul "Gustl" Gustave	
1936	Against the Current	–	Director, writer
1937	The Sheik Steps Out	Ahmed Ben Nesib	
1938	A Desperate Adventure	André Friezan	Alternative title: It Happened in Paris
1940	La Comédie du bonheur	Félix	
1940	Ecco la felicità	Felice Ciatti	Italian version of La comédie du bonheur
1942	The Saint Who Forged a Country	Juan Diego	
1949	We Were Strangers	Chief	
1949	The Big Steal	Inspector General Ortega	
1950	The Outriders	Don Antonio Chaves	
1950	Crisis	Colonel Adragon	
1960	Heller in Pink Tights	De Leon	

Television
Year	Title	Role	Notes
1958	Disney's Wonderful World	Don Esteban Miranda	2 episodes
1962	Thriller	Maestro Giuliano	Episode: "La Strega"
1964	Dr. Kildare	Gaspero Paolini	3 episodes
1964–1965	Combat!	Charles Gireaux; Count De Roy	2 episodes "Silver Service" & "Finest Hour"
1965	Bonanza	Jose Ortega	Episode: "The Brass Box"
1967	The Wild Wild West	Don Tomas	Episode: "The Night of the Assassin"
1968	The High Chaparral	Padre Guillermo	Episode: "A Joyful Noise", (final appearance)

== Bibliography ==
- Ramírez, Gabriel (1989). Crónica del cine mudo mexicano. México: Cineteca Nacional. ISBN 968-805-416-X.
- Orozco, Federico (1996). Albores del cine mexicano. Editorial Clío. ISBN 968-6932-45-3.
- Ellenberger, Allan R. (1999). Ramon Novarro: A Biography of the Silent Film Idol, 1899–1968, with a Filmography. New York: McFarland & Co. ISBN 0-533-13396-3.
- Soares, André (1999). Beyond Paradise: A Biography of Ramón Novarro. New York: St. Martin's Press. ISBN 978-1-60473-457-7.
