= Wayfarers Chapel =

Historic church in California, United States

- "The Glass Church"
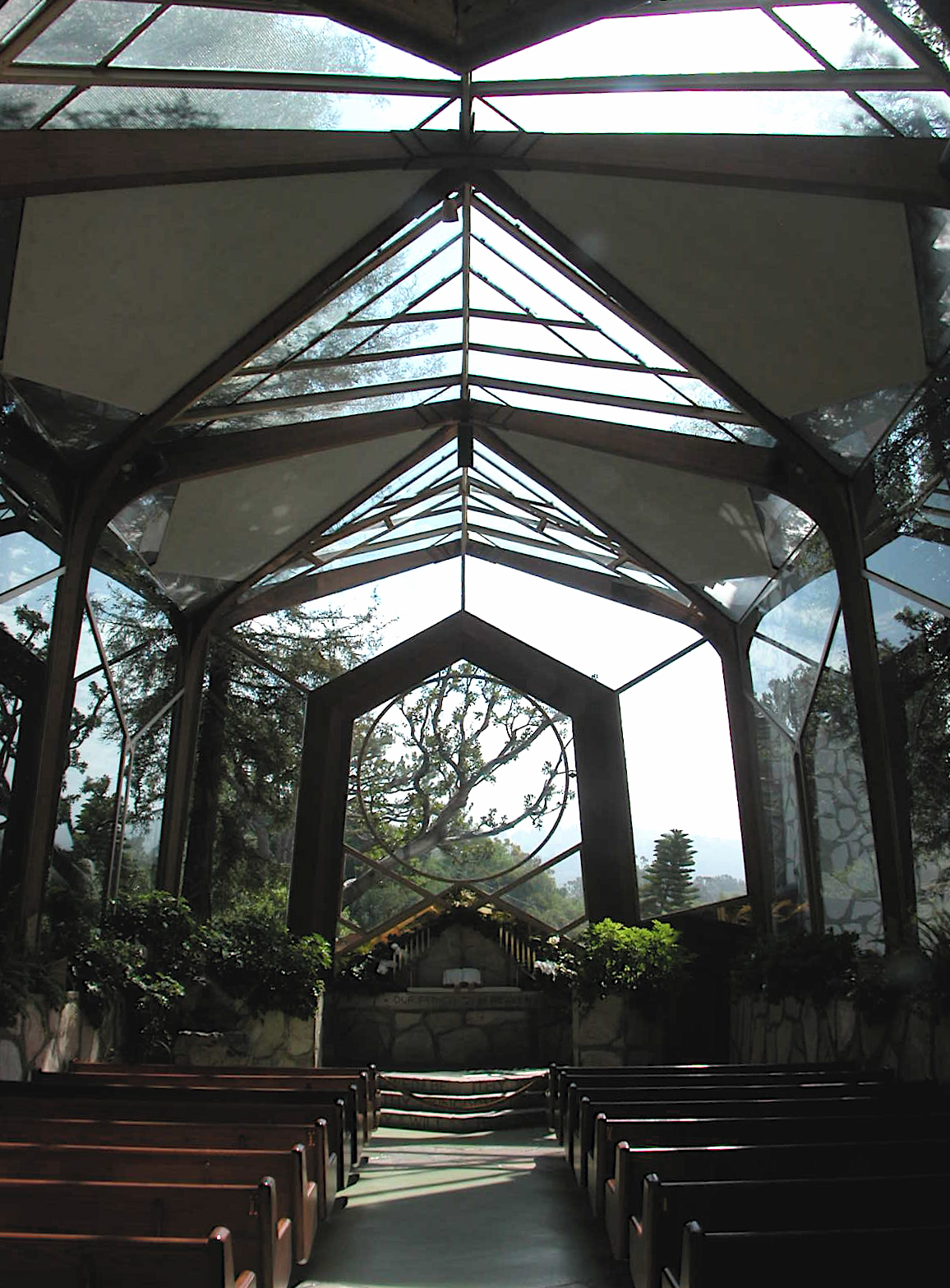
- Wayfarers Chapel
- Location: 5755 Palos Verdes Drive South; Rancho Palos Verdes, California
- Country: United States
- Denomination: Swedenborgian
- Website: wayfarerschapel.org

Architecture
- Functional status: Active
- Heritage designation: National Historic Landmark
- Architect: Lloyd Wright
- Style: Modernist
- Wayfarers Chapel
- U.S. National Register of Historic Places
- U.S. National Historic Landmark
- Location within the Los Angeles metropolitan area Location within California
- Location: 5755 Palos Verdes Dr. S Rancho Palos Verdes, California
- Coordinates: 33°44′37.1″N 118°22′39.9″W
- Area: 3.528 acres (1.428 ha)
- Built: 1951
- NRHP reference No.: 05000210 (NRHP listing), 100009801 (NHL designation)

Significant dates
- Added to NRHP: July 11, 2005
- Designated NHL: December 11, 2023

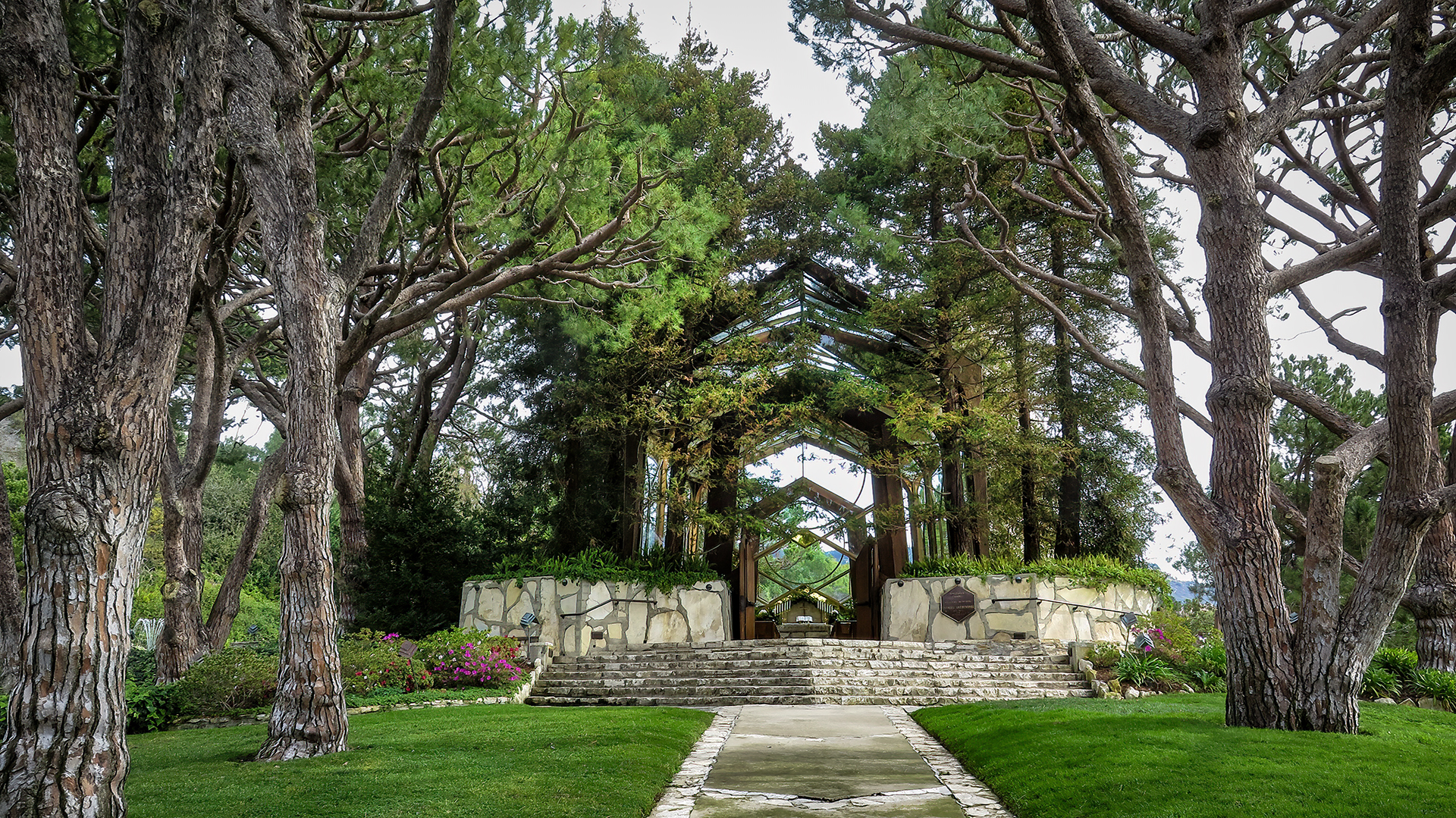
Wayfarers Chapel in 2015

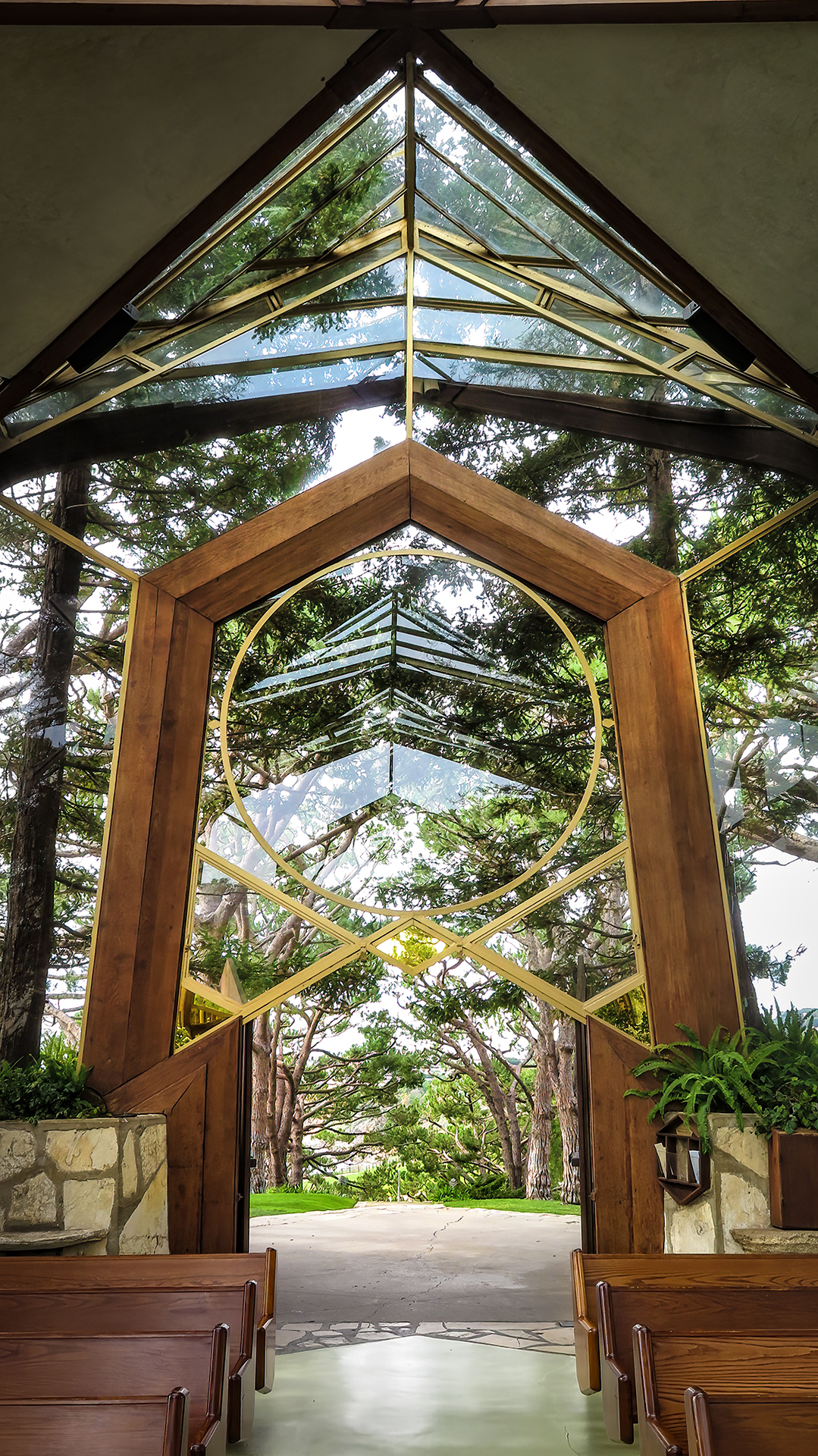
Interior view of the front entrance in 2015

Wayfarers Chapel, or "The Glass Church", is a disassembled chapel designed by Lloyd Wright and originally located in Rancho Palos Verdes, California. The chapel had unique organic architecture sited on a bluff above the Pacific Ocean. Affiliated with the Swedenborgian Church of North America, it served as a memorial to the 18th-century scientist and theosopher Emanuel Swedenborg. Built in 1949, the chapel was dismantled in 2024 and carefully stored after extreme earth movement had damaged the structure. In 2025, the chapel announced they were attempting to relocate to a new location in Rancho Palos Verdes.

== History ==
The 100-seat church was designed by Lloyd Wright (son of Frank Lloyd Wright) in the late 1940s and was built between 1949 and 1951, at a cost of $25,000. Additions were built in later years, including a tower and a visitor center, the latter of which had been lost in a landslide during the 1960s. Because of its scenic location, the church is popular for weddings. In 1999, the chapel hosted 800 weddings.

=== Closure and disassembly ===
In February 2024, the chapel's leadership announced "the closure of Wayfarers Chapel and its surrounding property due to the accelerated land movement in our local area". The closure resulted in the cancellation of 175 events scheduled for the following eight months. By April 2024, panes of glass in the chapel had broken, the foundation suffered significant damage, and walkways around the site were cracked and jagged. Officials said that they will not be able to restore the chapel on their property and are considering relocation. In May, the decision was made to begin to carefully deconstruct the structure in order to preserve as much of the original materials as possible, in collaboration with historic preservation experts and the National Park Service.

By September 2024, the chapel had been fully dismantled. Thousands of parts were meticulously documented and stored at a covered location near the chapel on stable ground. The only parts which could not be fully saved were the panes of glass which had already sustained damage; samples of them were preserved to support the creation of appropriate duplicates in the future. It was still unclear where and when the chapel would be rebuilt and how an estimated $20–30 million for the chapel's reconstruction would be raised.

=== Potential relocation ===
In May 2025, Wayfarers Chapel announced they were working to secure a new location to rebuild. The prospective location is at the Battery Barnes military site near Rancho Palos Verdes City Hall, about 1 mile (1.6 km) west of the original location.

== Architecture and design ==
As with many of Wright's buildings, the chapel features geometric designs and incorporates the natural landscape into the design. Wright departed from the tradition of using masonry in order to "achieve a delicate enclosure that allows the surrounding landscape to define the sacred space". In the 1950s, the chapel featured a hanging garden.

The Wayfarers Chapel was listed in the National Register of Historic Places in 2005 and was designated a National Historic Landmark for its architecture and landscaping in 2023.

== In popular culture ==
The church was featured in the Fox teen drama television series The O.C., as the site of weddings and funerals. It was also featured briefly on the American science fiction television series Sliders, and in an episode of The Rockford Files (season 2, episode 10, "2 Into 5.56 Won't Go"). In addition, the chapel was part of the final marriage scene in Innerspace, and two episodes in season four of 90210. The chapel was featured in one of the final scenes in the 2014 movie Endless Love, as well as being featured in the ABC television series Revenge. Clean Bandit's 2018 song "Baby" had its music video's wedding scene filmed at the chapel, and The Fox show, Lucifer. Pentatonix's video for the song "Amazing Grace" was filmed at the chapel.

Celebrities who were married at the church have included Jayne Mansfield and Mickey Hargitay (January 13, 1958) as well as Brian Wilson and Melinda Ledbetter (1995).

== Image gallery ==
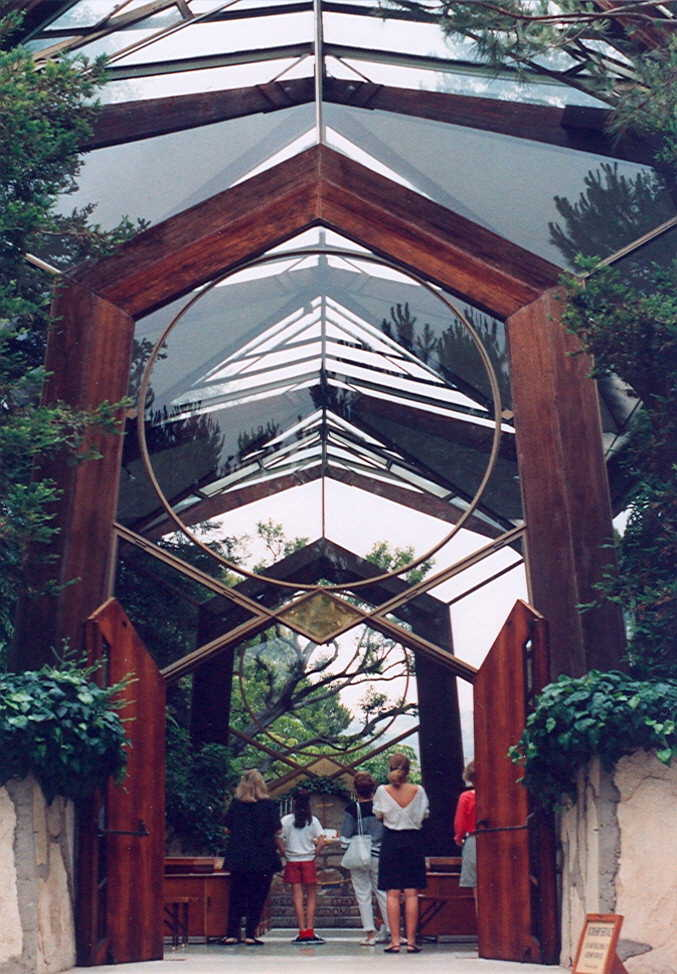
Entrance to the Wayfarers Chapel.

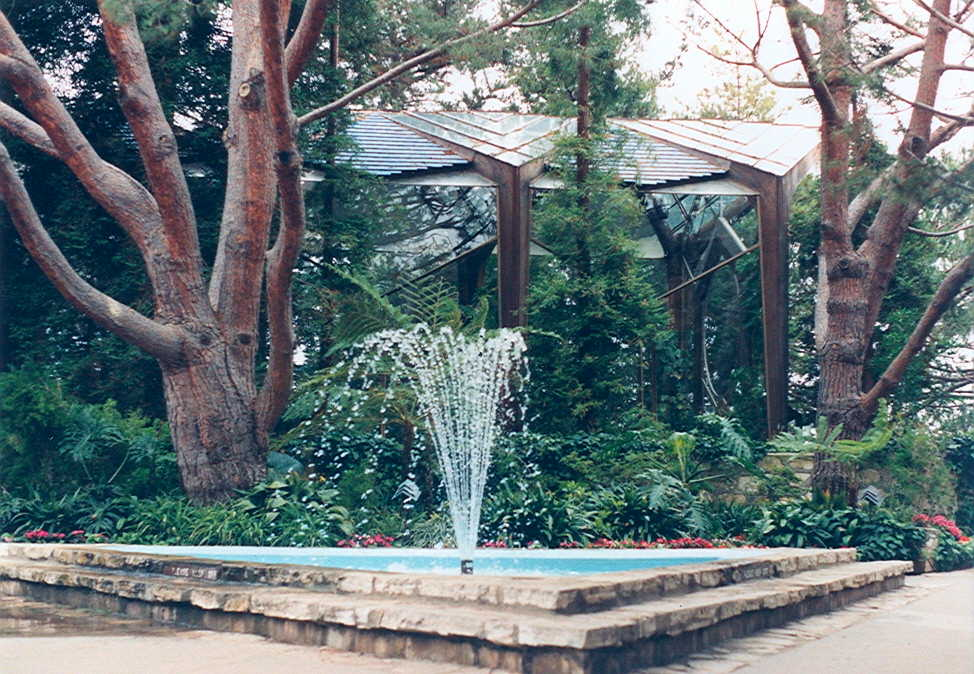
The chapel grounds feature fountains and gardens.

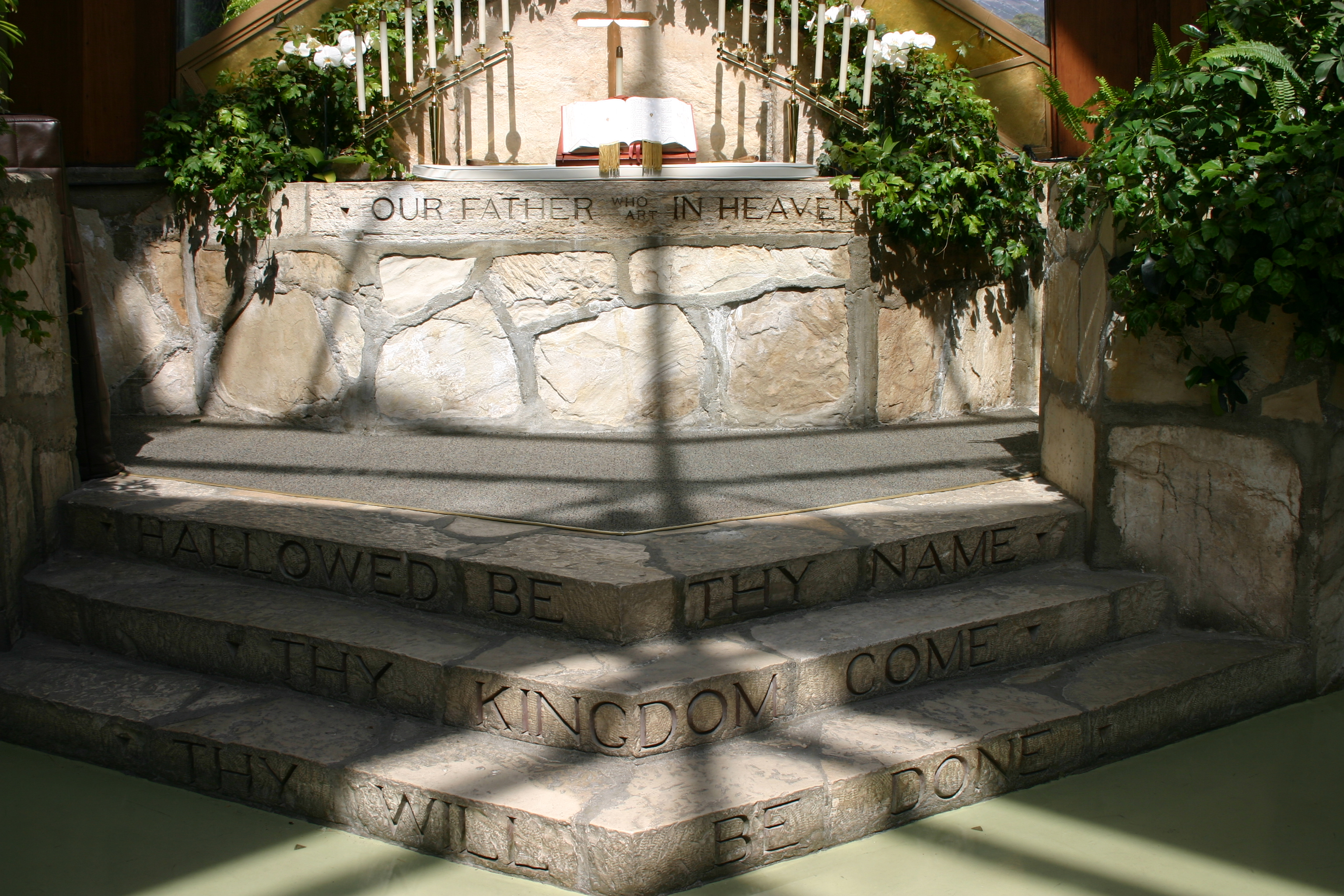
The Lord's Prayer on the altar and dais inside the Wayfarers Chapel.

== See also ==
- List of National Historic Landmarks in California
- National Register of Historic Places listings in Los Angeles County, California
