= The Pagan =

1929 film

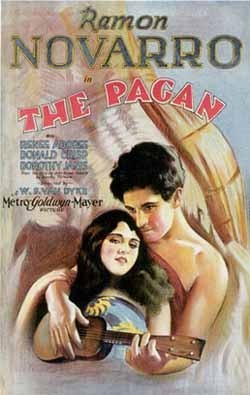
- Theatrical release poster
- Directed by: W. S. Van Dyke
- Written by: Dorothy Farnum (scenario); John Howard Lawson (intertitles); John Russell
- Based on: In Dark Places; 1923 novel by John Russell
- Produced by: Louis B. Mayer; Irving Thalberg
- Starring: Ramon Novarro; Renée Adorée; Donald Crisp; Dorothy Janis
- Cinematography: Clyde De Vinna
- Edited by: Ben Lewis
- Music by: William Axt (music score); Nacio Herb Brown (theme song); Arthur Freed (theme song)
- Production company: Metro-Goldwyn-Mayer
- Distributed by: Metro-Goldwyn-Mayer
- Release date: April 27, 1929
- Running time: 9 reels; 7,459 feet
- Country: United States
- Languages: Sound (synchronized); English intertitles

The Pagan is a 1929 synchronized sound romantic drama filmed in Tahiti and produced and distributed by Metro-Goldwyn-Mayer. While the film has no audible dialog, it was released with a synchronized musical score with sound effects using both the sound-on-disc and sound-on-film process. Both director W. S. Van Dyke and cinematographer Clyde De Vinna had previously visited Tahiti in 1928 to film White Shadows in the South Seas. The Pagan stars Ramon Novarro.

The film has a slight resemblance in story to an earlier Novarro silent, Where the Pavement Ends (1923), directed by Rex Ingram and now lost.

== Plot ==
The Pagan (1929)

Trader Henry Slater stops at a South Pacific island looking to obtain a cargo of copra. He is informed that half-caste Henry Shoesmith, Jr. owns the largest plantation, but is rather indolent.

Meanwhile, Shoesmith is lolling around, while admirer Madge wishes she had met him before she became a fallen woman. Then the young man hears a woman singing aboard a ship. He swims out and is strongly attracted to Tito. She, however, rebuffs him.

When the narrow-minded Slater first meets Shoesmith, he is quite rude to the native, but soon changes his manner when he learns who the young man is. The easygoing Shoesmith does not take offense, and is delighted to be formally introduced to Tito, Slater's half-caste ward. Slater starts to bargain for copra and is pleasantly surprised when Shoesmith offers him as much as he wants for free. He takes the precaution of having Shoesmith sign a contract to that effect.

Tito eventually falls in love with Shoesmith, but Slater has other plans for her. He tells Shoesmith to stay away from his ward, using the excuse that Shoesmith has no ambition. He suggests to the naive younger man that he take out a bank loan and build up his business. Then he sails away with Tito and his copra.

Shoesmith follows Slater's advice and runs a store, but Madge warns him he does not know what he is doing (he allows every customer to buy on credit). When Slater returns, Shoesmith asks Tito to marry him. She agrees. However, Slater informs the puzzled Shoesmith that the loan payments are overdue and that he is foreclosing on all of Shoesmith's property. In addition, Slater informs his ward that he will "sacrifice" himself to protect her by marrying her himself. Shoesmith is too late to stop the wedding, but while Madge distracts the guests, he carries Tito off to his native home.

Slater finds Tito while Shoesmith is away, takes her back to his ship and starts to beat her. Shoesmith follows, and a fight ensues. The younger man wins, and he and Tito swim back toward the island. However, when they spot approaching sharks, they have no choice but to head back to Slater, pursuing in his dinghy. Slater takes Tito aboard, but keeps his rival at bay with a sword. Shoesmith swims under the boat to the other side and topples Slater into the water, where the sharks get him. The young couple return to their idyllic home.

== Cast ==
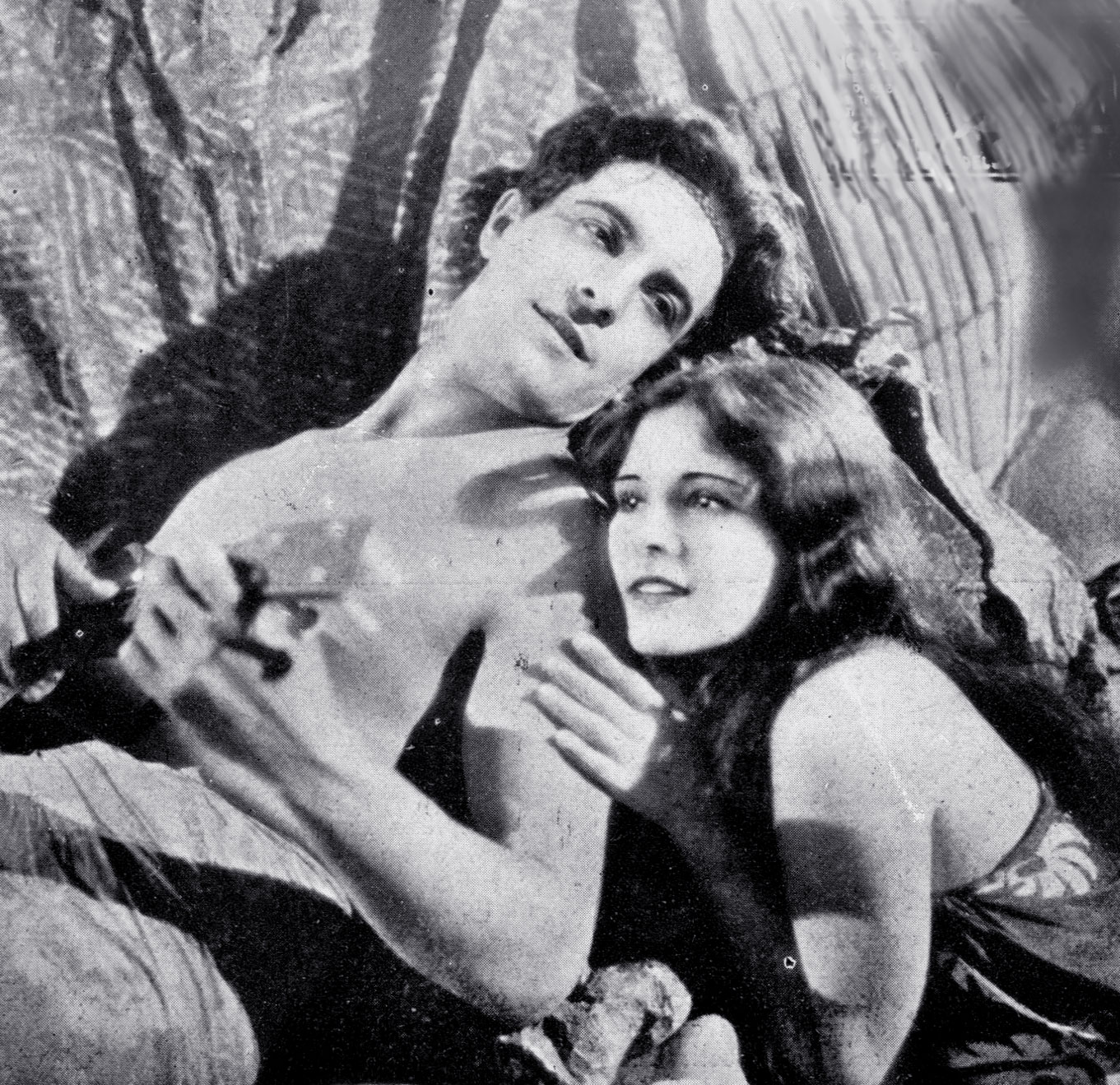
Ramon Novarro and Dorothy Janis in The Pagan

- Ramon Novarro as Henry Shoesmith Jr.
- Renée Adorée as Madge
- Donald Crisp as Henry Slater
- Dorothy Janis as Tito

== Music ==
The film featured a theme song entitled “Pagan Love Song” which was composed by Arthur Freed (words) and Nacio Herb Brown (music).

== See also ==
- List of early sound feature films (1926–1929)
