= Devil-May-Care =

1929 film

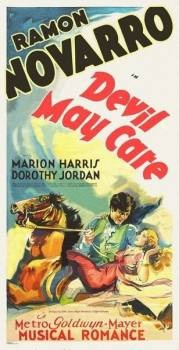
- Theatrical release poster
- Directed by: Sidney Franklin
- Written by: Hanns Kräly; Zelda Sears
- Screenplay by: Richard Schayer
- Based on: La Bataille de dames, ou un duel en amour by Ernest Legouvé and Eugène Scribe
- Starring: Ramon Novarro; Dorothy Jordan; Marion Harris; John Miljan; William Humphrey
- Cinematography: Merritt B. Gerstad
- Edited by: Conrad A. Nervig
- Music by: Herbert Stothart; William Axt
- Production company: Metro-Goldwyn-Mayer (MGM)
- Distributed by: Metro-Goldwyn-Mayer (MGM)
- Release date: December 27, 1929
- Running time: 97 minutes
- Country: United States
- Language: English
- Budget: $487,000
- Box office: $1,416,000 (worldwide rentals)

Devil-May-Care is a 1929 American pre-Code musical film directed by Sidney Franklin with a Technicolor sequence of the Albertina Rasch Dancers. The film was released by Metro-Goldwyn-Mayer on December 27, 1929 and was Ramon Novarro's talkie debut.

The film is based upon the 1851 play La Bataille de dames, ou un duel en amour by Ernest Legouvé and Eugène Scribe. It is known by a variety of other names, including Battle of the Ladies (the film's working title), Der Leutnant des Kaisers (Austria), Der jüngste Leutnant (Germany), Il tenente di Napoleone (Italy), and O lohagos tis aftokratorikis frouras (Greece).

== Plot ==
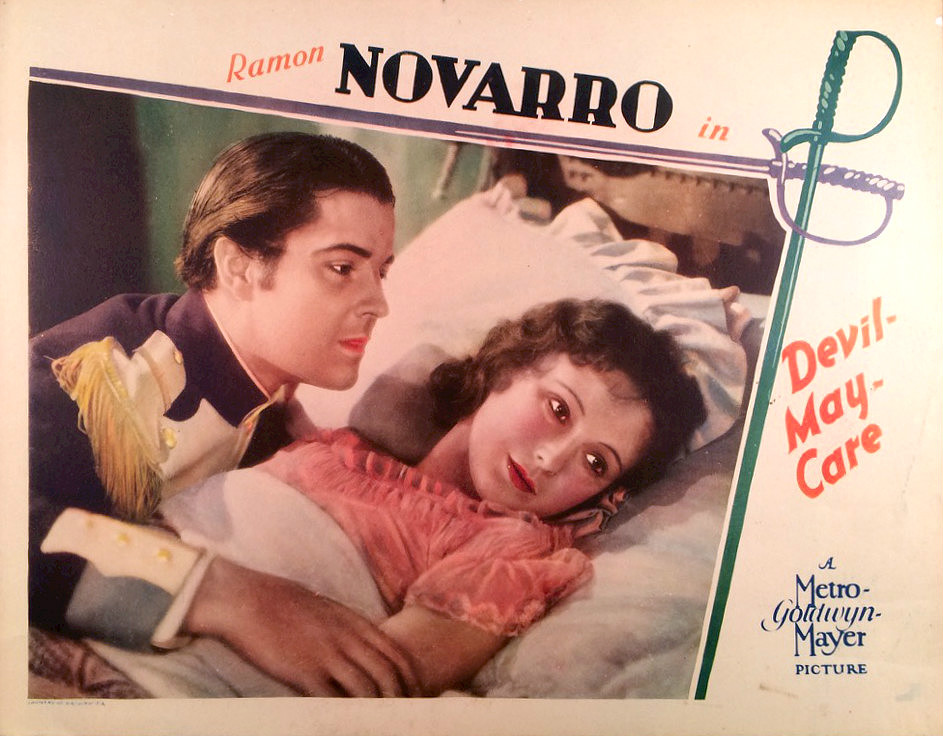
Lobby card

Devil-May-Care (1929)

This romantic adventure chronicles the escapades of one of Napoleon's followers. After his leader's exile, the follower is arrested and slated for execution. He is before the firing squad, but manages to escape. To hide, he dashes into the bedroom of a bedazzling Royalist. He falls in love, but she patriotically turns him in. Again he makes a daring escape. Once again he meets the beautiful woman, who undergoes a change of heart and this time, stays loyal to the daring adventurer. Songs include: "Bon Jour", "Louie", "March of the Old Guard", "Why Waste Your Charms", "The Gang Song", "Madame Pompadour", "Charming", "If He Cared".

== Cast ==
- Ramon Novarro as Armand
- Dorothy Jordan as Leonie
- Marion Harris as Louise
- John Miljan as DeGrignon
- William Humphrey as Napoleon
- George Davis as Groom
- Clifford Bruce as Gaston
- Lionel Belmore as Innkeeper (uncredited)
- John Carroll as Bonapartist (uncredited)
- George Chandler as Timid Royalist (uncredited)
- Ann Dvorak as Chorine (uncredited)
- Bob Kortman as Bonapartist (uncredited)

== Soundtrack ==
- "Shepherd Serenade"

Written by Clifford Grey and Herbert Stothart

- "Charming"

Written by Clifford Grey and Herbert Stothart

- "If He Cared"

Written by Clifford Grey and Herbert Stothart

- "March of the Guard"

Written by Clifford Grey and Herbert Stothart

- "Love Ballet"

Written by Dimitri Tiomkin
Performed by Albertina Rasch Dancers

== See also ==
- List of early color feature films
- List of early sound feature films (1926–1929)
