= The Arab (1924 film) =

1924 film by Rex Ingram

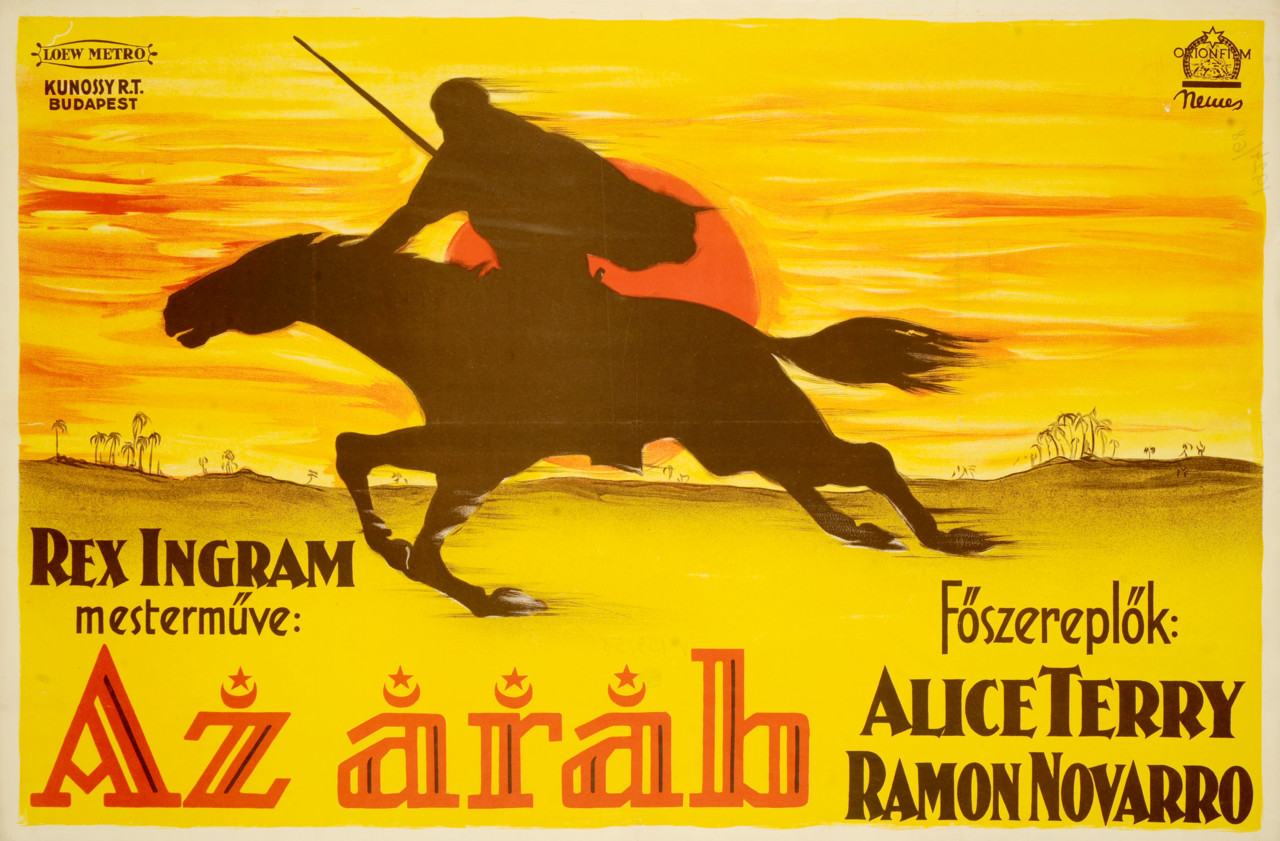
- Movie poster in Hungarian
- Directed by: Rex Ingram
- Screenplay by: Rex Ingram
- Based on: The Arab, A Play (1911) by Edgar Selwyn
- Starring: Ramon Novarro; Alice Terry
- Cinematography: John F. Seitz
- Edited by: Grant Whytock
- Production company: Metro-Goldwyn-Mayer
- Distributed by: Metro-Goldwyn Pictures
- Release date: July 21, 1924
- Country: United States
- Languages: Silent film English intertitles

The Arab is a 1924 American silent drama film starring Ramon Novarro and Alice Terry, written and directed by Rex Ingram, based on a 1911 play by Edgar Selwyn.

== Plot ==
Jamil is a soldier in the Bedouin defense forces during a war between Syria and Turkey, who has deserted his regiment. In a remote village, he encounters an orphan asylum run by American missionaries Dr. Hilbert and his daughter Mary. The village is attacked by the Turks, and its ruler, eager to placate the invaders, intends to hand over the children for slaughter; he disguises his intentions under a move to Damascus for their safety.

The Bedouins arrive at the scene and reveal that Jamil is the son of the tribal leader. With his father's death revealed, Jamil becomes the new leader of the tribe, which endows him with a sense of responsibility. Risking his own life, he proceeds to save the children, defeating the Turks and the local leader in the process (and winning the girl).

== Cast ==
- Ramon Novarro as Jamil Abdullah Azam
- Alice Terry as Mary Hilbert
- Max Maxudian as The Governor
- Jean de Limur as Hossein
- Paul Vermoyal as Iphraim
- Adelqui Migliar as Abdullah
- Florica Alexandresco as Oulad Nile
- Justa Uribe as Myrza
- Jerrold Robertshaw as Dr. Hilbert
- Paul Franceschi as Marmount
- Giuseppe di Campo as Selim
- Haydée Tamzali

== Production background ==
The movie was filmed in Tunisia just before the MGM merger, and edited under the new regime. Ingram reacted negatively to the supervision of studio bosses Mayer and Thalberg. He was backed by the New York powers of Marcus Loew and Nicholas Schenck and moved to the French Riviera, where all his subsequent films were made.

== Preservation status ==
This is one of 12 surviving films of Terry. A print is preserved in the Russian archive Gosfilmofond and a digitally-preserved print was presented to the Library of Congress in October 2010. Another copy is located in the Cinematheque Royale de Belgique in Brussels.

== Remake ==
The film was remade as The Barbarian (1933) again with Novarro and co-starring Myrna Loy.
