= Herbert Howe (journalist) =

American journalist

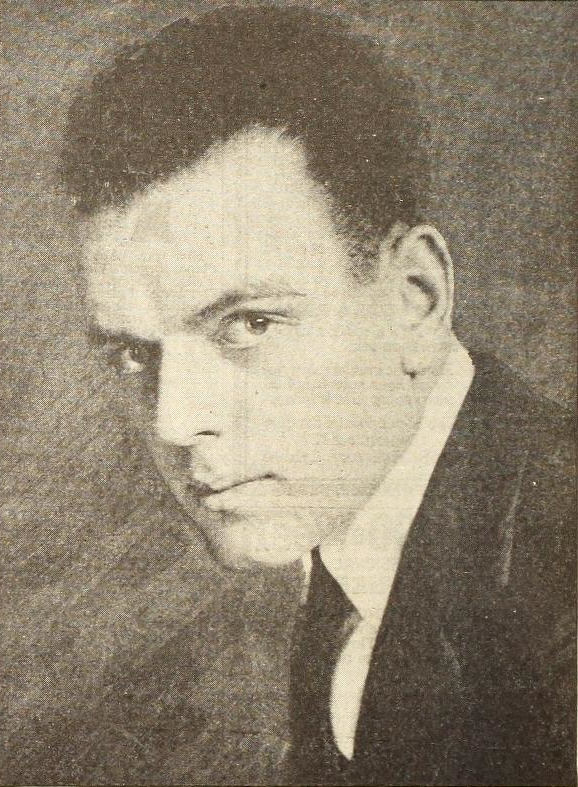
- Howe, c. 1920
- Born: September 1893; Sioux Falls, South Dakota, U.S.
- Died: October 23, 1959 (aged 66); Los Angeles, California, U.S.
- Occupation: Journalist

Herbert Howe (September 1893 – October 23, 1959) was an American journalist who was a popular Hollywood news writer in the 1920s.

Born in Sioux Falls, South Dakota, Howe was one of the most popular Hollywood news writers of his day during the 1920s and 1930s, writing for early film fan magazine Photoplay.

Closeted in keeping with the times, Howe was a lover of Ramon Novarro, for whom he worked as a publicist/press agent, and a friend of adventure traveller and travel writer Richard Halliburton.

Howe died of pneumonia in Los Angeles in 1959.
