= California county routes in zone N =

- Example of a California county route shield

Highway names
- County: County Route X (CR X) or Route X

System links
- County routes in California

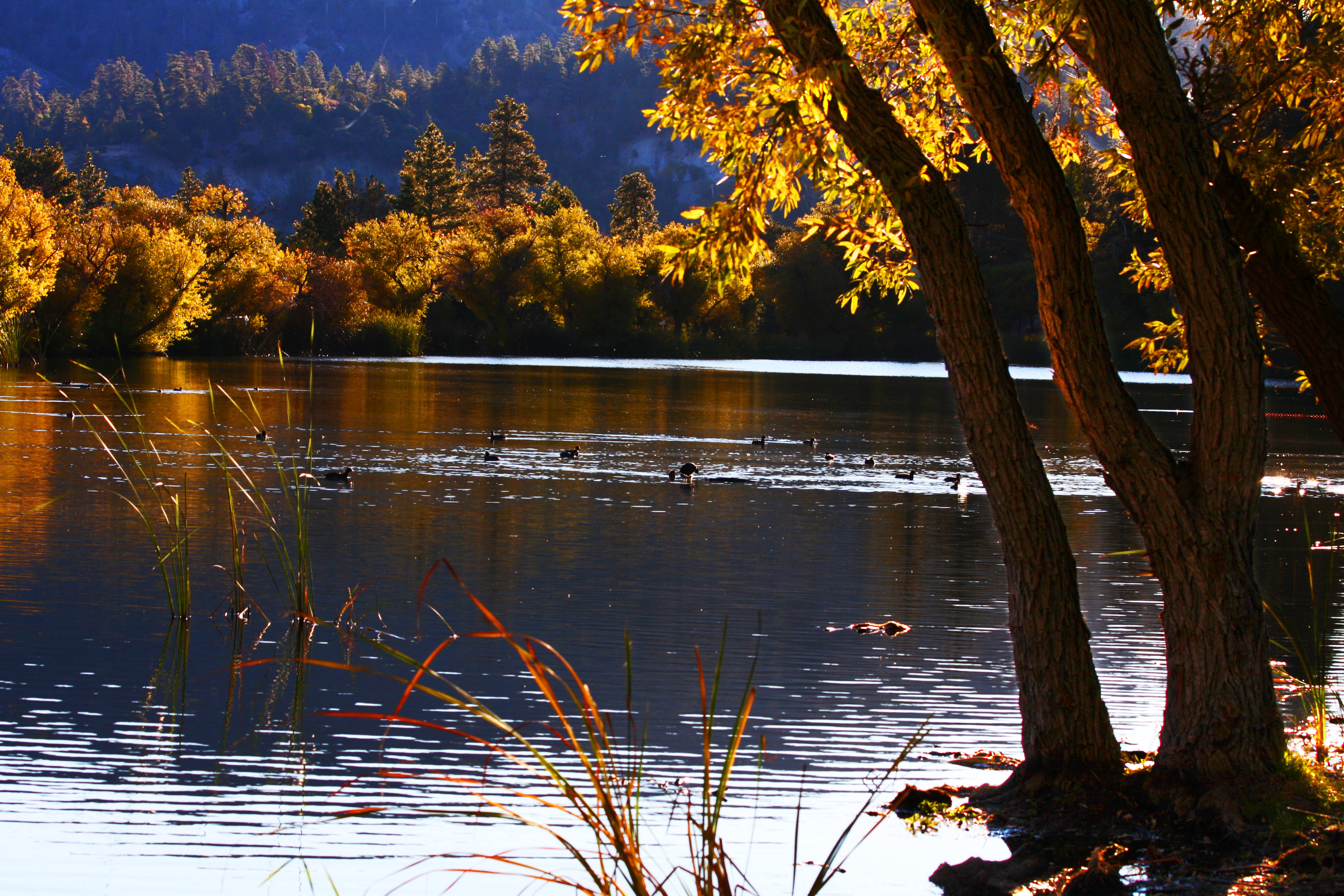
Jackson Lake, on County Route N4 near Big Pines.

There are 9 routes assigned to the "N" zone of the California Route Marker Program, which designates county routes in California. The "N" zone includes county highways lying in Los Angeles and Orange counties.

== N1 ==
County Road N1
- "The road from the Valley to the Sea"
- Location: Malibu–Calabasas
- Length: 8.5 mi (13.7 km)
- Existed: 1963–present
- Tourist routes: Las Virgenes Road/Malibu Canyon Road

County Route N1 (CR N1) is a county highway in Los Angeles County, California, United States. It runs 3.5 miles (5.63 km) from State Route 1 in Malibu to US 101 in Calabasas (Google Maps and other commercially produced maps however may show CR N1 continuing north along Las Virgenes Road from US 101 to the Upper Las Virgenes Canyon Open Space Preserve). Locals refer to the route as a whole as Malibu Canyon. This route was defined in 1963. The segment of CR N1 between SR 1 and Lost Hills Road in Calabasas is part of the State Scenic Highway System. Major landmarks along the route include Pepperdine University on the west side of the road at Pacific Coast Highway. Soka University was located at King Gillette Ranch along this road near the intersection of Mullholland Highway. Plans to expand were stopped and the land sold to the National Park Service in 2005. The main entrance Malibu Creek State Park is just south of that same intersection. Also nearby is the Malibu Hindu Temple.

== N2 ==
County Road N2
- Location: Quail Lake–Palmdale
- Length: 40.4 mi (65.0 km)
- Existed: 1963–present

County Route N2 (CR N2) is a county highway in Los Angeles County, California, United States. It runs from State Route 138 at Quail Lake to State Route 14 in Palmdale. The route is known as Old Ridge Route Road, Pine Canyon Road, Lake Elizabeth Road, and Palmdale Boulevard.

Route description

CR N2 begins at the junction of State Route 138 at Quail Lake and heads south along the old Ridge Route (as Old Ridge Route Road) to Sandberg, and then southeast, parallel to the San Andreas Fault along Pine Canyon Road to Lake Hughes Road in Lake Hughes. From there, it continues straight ahead initially southeast along the San Andreas Fault on Lake Elizabeth Road and then, leaving the fault it continues east on Lake Elizabeth Road to 10th Street West / Tierra Subida Avenue in Palmdale. From there, it continues straight ahead on Palmdale Boulevard to its end at the junction with the Antelope Valley Freeway (SR 14) and SR 138 in Palmdale.

Major intersections

The entire route is in Los Angeles County.

Location	mi	km	Destinations	Notes
	0.0	0.0	SR 138 (Lancaster Road)	Western terminus; former US 99 north
Sandberg	2.2	3.5	Old Ridge Route Road south / Mesa View Drive – Castaic	East end of Old Ridge Route Road on CR N2; west end of Pine Canyon Road; former US 99 south
Three Points	10.2	16.4	Three Points Road	
Lake Hughes	19.7	31.7	Lake Hughes Road – Castaic, San Fernando	East end of Pine Canyon Road; west end of Elizabeth Lake Road
Lake Elizabeth	24.4	39.3	Johnson Road – Quartz Hill, Lancaster	
Andrade Corner	25.1	40.4	San Francisquito Canyon Road – Green Valley	
Leona Valley	31.8	51.2	Bouquet Canyon Road – Saugus, Los Angeles	
Leona Valley–Palmdale line	32.5	52.3	Godde Hill Road – Quartz Hill, Lancaster	
Palmdale	37.9	61.0	Highland Street (25th Street West)	
Palmdale	39.4	63.4	10th Street West, Tierra Subida Avenue	East end of Elizabeth Lake Road; west end of Palmdale Boulevard
Palmdale	39.9	64.2	5th Street West	
Palmdale	40.4	65.0	SR 14 / SR 138 (Antelope Valley Freeway) – Los Angeles, Mojave	Interchange; eastern terminus; SR 14 exit 35; road continues as SR 138
1.000 mi = 1.609 km; 1.000 km = 0.621 mi

== N3 ==
County Road N3 and Forest Highway 59
- Angeles Forest Highway
- Location: Mostly in Angeles National Forest
- Length: 25 mi (40 km)
- Existed: 1963–present

County Route N3 (CR N3) is designated with Forest Highway 59 (FH 59) along the entire length of the Angeles Forest Highway in Los Angeles County, California, United States. It runs approximately 25 miles (40 km) from Sierra Highway south of Palmdale to Angeles Crest Highway north of La Cañada Flintridge. It was originally surveyed in 1913 and constructed between 1932 and 1941 to access Southern California Edison transmission lines that cross the San Gabriel Mountains between the Antelope Valley and the Los Angeles Basin. It was defined as a county highway in 1963.

== N4 ==
County Road N4
- Location: Big Pines–Llano
- Length: 12.50 mi (20.12 km)
- Existed: 1963–present

County Route N4 (CR N4), known as the Big Pines Highway and Largo Vista Road, is a county highway in Los Angeles County, California, United States. It connects State Route 2 (Angeles Crest Highway) in Big Pines with State Route 138 (Pearblossom Highway) near Llano. It is built directly on the trace of the San Andreas Fault.

Major intersections

The entire route is in Los Angeles County.

Location	mi	km	Destinations	Notes
Big Pines	0.0	0.0	SR 2 (Angeles Crest Highway) to SR 138 / I-15 – Los Angeles, Wrightwood	Southern terminus
Mile High	6.6	10.6	Big Pines Highway – Valyermo	North end of Big Pines Highway on CR N4; south end of Largo Vista Road
	12.5	20.1	SR 138 (Pearblossom Highway) to SR 14 / I-15 – Pearblossom, Palmdale	Northern terminus; road continues north as Largo Vista Road
1.000 mi = 1.609 km; 1.000 km = 0.621 mi

== N5 ==
County Road N5
- Location: Del Sur–Butte Valley Wildflower Sanctuary
- Length: 29 mi (47 km)
- Existed: 1964–present

County Route N5 (CR N5) is a county highway in Los Angeles County, California, United States. It is known as Avenue J for the most part and is one of the principal major east–west thoroughfares in Lancaster, California. The route runs from State Route 14 (Antelope Valley Freeway) in Lancaster to the Butte Valley Wildflower Sanctuary on 190th Street East near Hi Vista.

Major intersections

The entire route is in Los Angeles County.

Location	mi	km	Destinations	Notes
Del Sur	0.0	0.0	90th Street West / Avenue J	Western terminus; road continues as Avenue J
Lancaster	2.0	3.2	70th Street West	
Lancaster	4.0	6.4	50th Street West	
Lancaster	5.0	8.0	40th Street West	
Lancaster	5.5	8.9	35th Street West	
Lancaster	6.0	9.7	30th Street West	
Lancaster	6.5	10.5	25th Street West	
Lancaster	6.8	10.9	SR 14 north (Antelope Valley Freeway) – Mojave	Access to SR 14 south and from SR 14 north is via 20th Street West and Avenue J-8; SR 14 south exit 43
Lancaster	7.0	11.3	20th Street West to SR 14 south (Antelope Valley Freeway) – Los Angeles	
Lancaster	7.5	12.1	15th Street West	
Lancaster	8.0	12.9	10th Street West	
Lancaster	8.5	13.7	5th Street West	
Lancaster	8.8	14.2	Sierra Highway	Former US 6
Lancaster	9.0	14.5	Division Street	
Lancaster	9.5	15.3	5th Street East	
Lancaster	10.0	16.1	Challenger Way	
Lancaster	10.5	16.9	15th Street East	
Lancaster	11.0	17.7	20th Street East	
Lancaster	11.5	18.5	25th Street East	
Lancaster	12.0	19.3	30th Street East	
Lancaster	12.5	20.1	35th Street East	
Lancaster	13.0	20.9	40th Street East	
Lancaster	14.0	22.5	50th Street East	
Lancaster	16.0	25.7	70th Street East	
	18.0	29.0	90th Street East – Edwards Air Force Base	
	20.0	32.2	110th Street East	
	22.0	35.4	130th Street East	
	24.0	38.6	150th Street East	
	26.0	41.8	170th Street East – Wilsona Gardens, Lake Los Angeles	
	28.0	45.1	190th Street East south / Avenue J east to US 395 – El Mirage, Adelanto	East end of Avenue J on CR N5; west end of 190th Street East on CR N5
Butte Valley Wildflower Sanctuary	29.0	46.7	190th Street East south / Avenue I – Butte Valley Wildflower Sanctuary	Eastern terminus; road continues north as 190th Street East
1.000 mi = 1.609 km; 1.000 km = 0.621 mi: Incomplete access

== N6 ==
County Road N6
- Location: Devil's Punchbowl Park–Pearblossom
- Length: 7.9 mi (12.7 km)
- Existed: 1964–present

County Route N6 (CR N6) is a county highway in Los Angeles County, California, United States. The route connects State Route 138 (SR 138) in Pearblossom with Devil's Punchbowl, a popular recreation area. CR N6 is known as Devil's Punch Bowl Road, Tumbleweed Road, Longview Road and a portion of Fort Tejon Road.

Major intersections

The entire route is in Los Angeles County.

Location	mi	km	Destinations	Notes
Devil's Punchbowl Park	0.0	0.0	Southern terminus	
	2.6	4.2	Route transitions from Devil's Punchbowl road to Tumbleweed Road	
	3.0	4.8	Longview Road south	North end of Tumbleweed Road; south end of Longview Road on CR N6
	5.3	8.5	Fort Tejon Road east – Valyermo	North end of Longview Road (first segment); south end of Fort Tejon Road on CR N6
	5.6	9.0	Fort Tejon Road west – Littlerock	North end of Fort Tejon Road on CR N6; south end of Longview Road (second segment)
Pearblossom	7.4	11.9	Avenue W	
Pearblossom	7.9	12.7	SR 138 (Pearblossom Highway) – Victorville, San Bernardino, Palmdale, Los Angeles	Northern terminus; road continues north as Longview Road
1.000 mi = 1.609 km; 1.000 km = 0.621 mi: Route transition

== N7 ==
County Road N7
- Hawthorne Boulevard
- Location: Rancho Palos Verdes–Torrance
- Length: 7.3 mi (11.7 km)
- Existed: 1964–present

County Route N7 (CR N7), known entirely as Hawthorne Boulevard, is a county highway in Los Angeles County, California, United States. It runs through the Palos Verdes Peninsula from Palos Verdes Drive West in Rancho Palos Verdes to State Route 1 (SR 1 in Torrance. Hawthorne Boulevard continues north of SR 1 signed as SR 107 to where that state highway ends at its intersection with Redondo Beach Boulevard.

Hawthorne Boulevard itself extends from the Palos Verdes Peninsula northward through Torrance, Lawndale, Hawthorne, Lennox, and Inglewood, a distance of more than twenty miles (32 km). Hawthorne Boulevard ends at Century Boulevard where it continues north to Hollywood as La Brea Avenue.

Hawthorne Boulevard is very distinctive through Lawndale and part of Hawthorne because it is very wide with business parking in the center between the northbound and southbound lanes; the parking area was once part of a Pacific Electric right-of-way.

Landmarks along Hawthorne Boulevard include Point Vicente Lighthouse park and Point Vicente Interpretive Center, Palos Verdes Peninsula High School, South Coast Botanic Garden, Del Amo Fashion Center, South Bay Galleria, Hawthorne Plaza, and a Metro C Line station at Interstate 105.

Metro Local Line 40 provide bus service between Century Boulevard and Artesia Boulevard. Metro Local Line 344 and Torrance Transit line 8 provide bus service south of Artesia Boulevard, with the former running to the Palos Verdes Peninsula and the latter to Pacific Coast Highway.

Major intersections

The entire route is in Los Angeles County.

Location	mi	km	Destinations	Notes
Rancho Palos Verdes	0.0	0.0	Palos Verdes Drive / Vía Vicente	Southern terminus; road continues as Vía Vicente
Rancho Palos Verdes	2.1	3.4	Crest Road	
Rolling Hills Estates	4.4	7.1	Silver Spur Road	
Rolling Hills Estates	5.8	9.3	Palos Verdes Drive	
Torrance	6.5	10.5	Rolling Hills Road	
Torrance	7.3	11.7	SR 1 (Pacific Coast Highway) / SR 107 north (Hawthorne Boulevard)	Northern terminus; road continues as SR 107 (Hawthorne Boulevard)
1.000 mi = 1.609 km; 1.000 km = 0.621 mi: Route transition

== N8 ==
County Road N8
- Location: Buena Park–West Covina
- Length: 16.76 mi (26.97 km)
- Existed: 1970–present

County Route N8 (CR N8) is a county highway in the U.S. state of California in Los Angeles and Orange counties. Its southern terminus is at Beach Boulevard (State Route 39) in Buena Park and its northern terminus is at Interstate 10 in West Covina. Only a quarter mile of the route is in Orange County (between Alondra Boulevard and SR 39). CR N8 is known as La Mirada Boulevard from Beach Boulevard in Buena Park to Colima Road in South Whittier, Colima Road from La Mirada Boulevard to Azusa Avenue in Hacienda Heights and Azusa Avenue from Colima Road to I-10 in West Covina.

Major intersections

County	Location	mi	km	Destinations	Notes
Orange	Buena Park	0.0	0.0	SR 39 (Beach Boulevard) – Huntington Beach, La Habra	Southern terminus; road continues as Malvern Avenue
Orange–Los Angeles county line	Buena Park–La Mirada line	0.6	0.97	Alondra Boulevard	
Los Angeles	La Mirada	1.4	2.3	Rosecrans Avenue	
Los Angeles	La Mirada	2.7	4.3	Imperial Highway	Former SR 90
Los Angeles	La Mirada–South Whittier line	3.3	5.3	Leffingwell Road	
Los Angeles	South Whittier	3.9	6.3	Mulberry Drive	
Los Angeles	South Whittier	4.3	6.9	Colima Road west	North end of La Mirada Boulevard; south end of Colima Road on CR N8
Los Angeles	South Whittier–Whittier line	4.4	7.1	Lambert Road	
Los Angeles	Whittier	4.9	7.9	SR 72 (Whittier Boulevard) – Pico Rivera, La Habra	
Los Angeles	Hacienda Heights	8.2	13.2	Hacienda Boulevard	Former SR 39
Los Angeles	Hacienda Heights	10.8	17.4	Colima Road east, Azusa Avenue south	North end of Colima Road on CR N8; south end of Azusa Avenue on CR N8
Los Angeles	Hacienda Heights–City of Industry line	11.2	18.0	SR 60 (Pomona Freeway) – Pomona, Los Angeles	Interchange; SR 60 exit 18
Los Angeles	City of Industry	11.4	18.3	Gale Avenue	
Los Angeles	City of Industry	13.3	21.4	Temple Avenue	
Los Angeles	West Covina	13.8	22.2	Amar Road	
Los Angeles	West Covina	16.8	27.0	I-10 (San Bernardino Freeway) / SR 39 (Azusa Avenue) – San Bernardino, Los Angeles, West Covina, Azusa	Interchange; northern terminus; I-10 exit 36; road continues as SR 39 (Azusa Avenue)
1.000 mi = 1.609 km; 1.000 km = 0.621 mi

== N9 ==
County Road N9
- Location: Malibu–Agoura Hills
- Length: 12.4 mi (20.0 km)
- Existed: 1974–present

County Route N9 (CR N9) is a county highway in Los Angeles County, California, United States, running 12.54 miles (20.18 km) from the coast in Malibu through the Santa Monica Mountains to US 101. It runs 6.54 miles (10.53 km) from State Route 1 (Pacific Coast Highway) along Kanan Dume Road to Mulholland Highway, and then 6 miles (9.66 km) from Mulholland Highway along Kanan Road to US 101 in Agoura Hills. The route was defined in 1974.

Major intersections

The entire route is in Los Angeles County.

Location	mi	km	Destinations	Notes
Malibu	0.0	0.0	SR 1 (Pacific Coast Highway)	Southern terminus
	6.2	10.0	Mulholland Highway	North end of Kanan Dume Road; south end of Kanan Road
Agoura Hills	12.1	19.5	Agoura Road	
Agoura Hills	12.2	19.6	US 101 south (Ventura Freeway) / Roadside Drive – Los Angeles	Interchange; northern terminus; US 101 exit 36; road continues as Kanan Road
Agoura Hills	12.4	20.0	US 101 north (Ventura Freeway) / Canwood Street – Ventura	Interchange; northern terminus; US 101 exit 36; road continues as Kanan Road
1.000 mi = 1.609 km; 1.000 km = 0.621 mi
