= Palos Verdes Drive =

Street that circles Palos Verdes in Los Angeles County, California

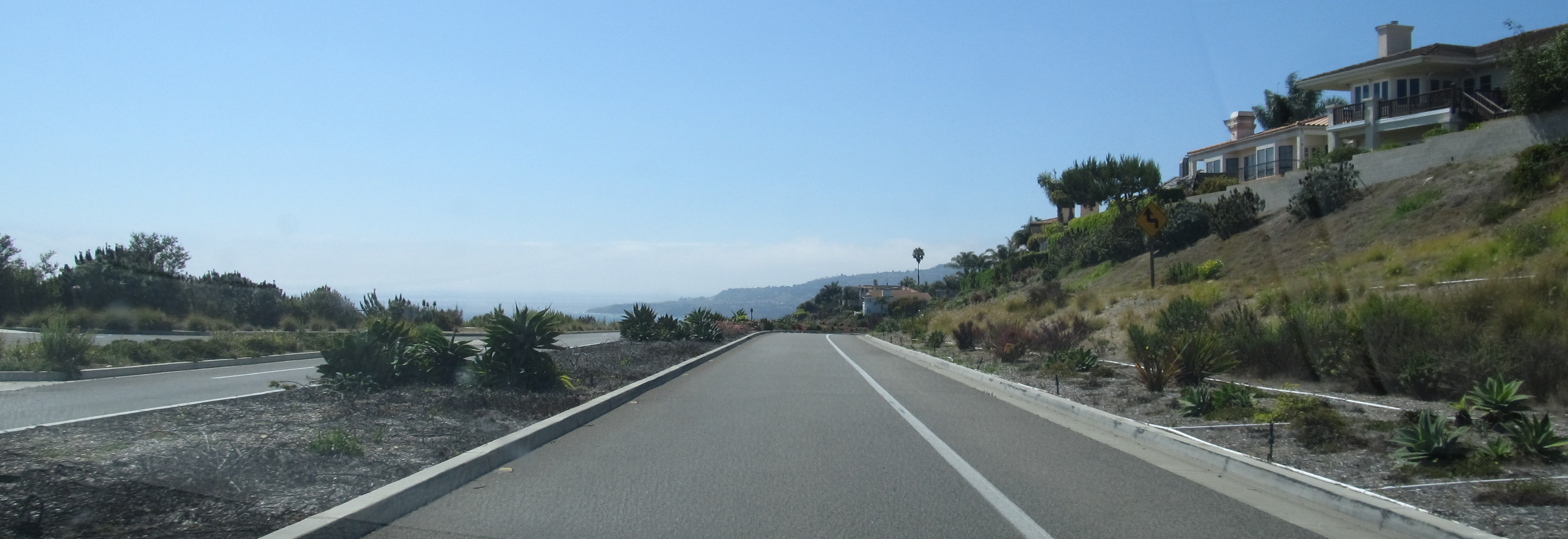
- The street in 2011
- Namesake: Rancho de los Palos Verdes
- Length: 27.5 mi (44.3 km)
- East end: Vermont Avenue / Anaheim Street / Gaffey Street in Harbor City
- Major junctions: SR 213 in Lomita; CR N7 in Rolling Hills Estates; CR N7 in Rancho Palos Verdes
- North end: Narbonne Avenue at the Rolling Hills Estates–Lomita line

Palos Verdes Drive is a major street that runs for 27.5 miles (44.3 km), circling the Palos Verdes Hills and Peninsula in the South Bay in Los Angeles County.

== Name ==
Palos Verdes Drive was named after Rancho de los Palos Verdes (transl. Ranch of the Green Trees), an 1800s Mexican land grant.

== Route ==
Palos Verdes Drive circles the Palos Verdes Hills and Peninsula and is divided into four parts: Palos Verdes Drive North, West, South, and East. Palos Verdes Drive North travels east-west inland on the peninsula, Palos Verdes Drive West travels north-south along the coast, Palos Verdes Drive South travels east-west along the coast, and Palos Verdes Drive East travels north-south inland. Palos Verdes Drive North and East cross each other, creating a circular route that is not a true circle.

From the east, Palos Verdes Drive begins at a five-point intersection with Vermont Avenue, Anaheim Street, and Gaffey Street in Harbor City, then travels west through Lomita, where it becomes a parkway as it continues west along the Rolling Hills/Rolling Hills Estates border, then through Rolling Hills Estates and Palos Verdes Estates. The road turns south while in Palos Verdes Estates, then continues into Rancho Palos Verdes, where it turns east. The parkway ends here but the street continues and turns north, where it re-enters Rolling Hills Estates. Here the street crosses its northern section and ends at the border of Rolling Hills Estates and Lomita.

In addition to the main circular section of Palos Verdes Drive, a 3 miles (4.8 km) branch of Palos Verdes Drive West extends north into Torrance and Redondo Beach, and a 0.5 miles (0.80 km) branch of Palos Verdes Drive South extends east to the San Pedro border.

== Transit ==
Palos Verdes Peninsula Transit Authority runs several weekday lines on Palos Verdes Drive, including the Blue, White, Green, Gold, Orange, 225, and 226 lines.

== Notable landmarks ==
Three city halls are located on or abut Palos Verdes Drive: Rolling Hills City Hall, Rolling Hills Estates City Hall, and Palos Verdes Estates City Hall. Other landmarks on the drive include (from east to around the peninsula to north): Ken Malloy Harbor Regional Park, Palos Verdes Reservoir, Bluff Cove, Palos Verdes Estates Shoreline Preserve, Point Vicente, Alta Vicente Reserve, Terranea Resort, Pelican Cove, Abalone Cove, Sacred Cove, Portuguese Bend, Trump National Golf Club, San Ramon Reserve, Miraleste Library, Palos Verdes Reservoir (again), and Rolling Hills Country Club. Wayfarers Chapel and Marineland of the Pacific were formerly located on Palos Verdes Drive as well.

Schools on Palos Verdes Drive include (from east to around the peninsula to north): Rolling Hills Preparatory, Dapplegray Elementary, Peninsula Heritage, Rolling Hills Country Day School, the Salvation Army College for Officer Training at Crestmont, UCLA South Bay Campus, and Miraleste Intermediate.
