= 40 Families Project =

Community history project

40 Families History Project is a community history project, focused on the vanished Japanese-American farming community of Palos Verdes, California.

== Origins ==
A photograph of a group of mostly Japanese farming families, taken in 1923, was displayed at the Malaga Cove Library in Palos Verdes Estates. In 2005, reference librarian Marjeanne Blinn started the 40 Families History Project, to "preserve the soon-to-be-forgotten history of the Peninsula’s Japanese American settlement to educate future generations."

== Outcomes ==
The 1923 photograph was enlarged and hung in the nearby Peninsula Center Library, in nearby Rolling Hills Estates. Volunteers identified over 100 individuals in the photograph, using various historical sources including draft records and alien registration records, as well as through interviews with surviving descendants of the community. Relationships between the individuals were also determined, using census records and interviews. Although the project retains the name "40 Families," volunteers have since determined that 50-60 families are represented in the photograph.

Details about the former residents' later lives are another interest of the project. Many of the individuals in the photograph were interned during World War II, but some may have returned to Japan before the war. Some stories are recovered at reunions of internees, or through research in old newspapers. The community land is no longer farmland, and the original structures no longer exist. Some of the community's land was at the current site of the Trump National Golf Club, and the nearby Terranea Resort.

Further photographs from this community's history have been donated to the project by descendants and local historians. The project maintains a website, a Flickr account, and a blog (now apparently dormant) to publicize its ongoing work. One volunteer created an online map, "Ranch Locations for the 40 Families Project," to depict the geographic extent of the community.

In 2009, the 40 Families History Project participated in "Camp Days, 1942–1945," an art show at Palos Verdes Art Center, highlighting the internment-themed works of Japanese-American artists Chizuko Judy Sugita de Queiroz and Henry Fukuhara.

Volunteers continue to work on the 40 Families History Project, contributing valuable research on the families and lives of the people in the 1923 image. The 40 Families History Project is considered an exemplary use of online and volunteer resources for local history libraries.
