= California State Route 107 =

State highway in California

State Route 107
- Hawthorne Boulevard
- SR 107 highlighted in red

Route information
- Maintained by Caltrans
- Length: 4.801 mi (7.726 km)

Major junctions
- South end: SR 1 in Torrance
- North end: Redondo Beach Boulevard at the Redondo Beach–Lawndale line

Location
- Country: United States
- State: California
- County: Los Angeles

Highway system
- State highways in California; Interstate; US; State; Scenic; History; Pre‑1964; Unconstructed; Deleted; Freeways
← I-105	→ SR 108

State Route 107 (SR 107) is a state highway in the U.S. state of California that forms part of Hawthorne Boulevard in the Los Angeles Area from State Route 1 (Pacific Coast Highway) in Torrance north to Redondo Beach Boulevard at the Redondo Beach–Lawndale border. Though some maps and signs may continue to mark SR 107 as extending north through Lawndale to Interstate 405 (I-405), control of the route within the city was relinquished to that local jurisdiction in 1999 and is thus no longer officially part of the state highway system. In 2026, the City of Torrance also began the process for the state to relinquish control of that city's segment of the highway, which would leave only the portion in Redondo Beach remaining.

== Route description ==
Route 107 is defined in section 407, subdivision (a), of the California Streets and Highways Code, last amended by the California State Legislature in 2004, and that the highway is "from Route 1 in Torrance to the southern city limits of Lawndale." Subdivision (b) states that control of the relinquished former segment of Route 107 in Lawndale is no longer officially part of the state highway system. Sections 407.5 and 407.6 also permit the state to also relinquish control of the portion of the highway located in Torrance and Redondo Beach, respectively.

SR 107 begins at State Route 1 in south Torrance and runs north along Hawthorne Boulevard in its entirety (Hawthorne Boulevard continues south of Route 1 as County Route N-7). In Redondo Beach, SR 107 crosses Artesia Boulevard (which was part of State Route 91 before it was truncated east to Vermont Avenue in Gardena) in Redondo Beach before Route 107 ends at Redondo Beach Boulevard at the Redondo Beach–Lawndale border. SR 107 runs along a stretch of principal arterial a principal arterial surface road in its entirety with grade crossings and maintains a wide right of way, often having as many as eight lanes and maintaining a 40 mph (60 km/h) speed limit. This segment of Hawthorne Boulevard goes through light and medium industrial areas and office towers, and serves Del Amo Fashion Center and South Bay Galleria malls.

SR 107 is part of the California Freeway and Expressway System, and is part of the National Highway System, a network of highways that are considered essential to the country's economy, defense, and mobility by the Federal Highway Administration.

== History ==
In 1964, Route 107 was defined to run past Interstate 405 along Hawthorne Boulevard, which renamed itself La Brea Avenue upon entering Inglewood at Century Boulevard, then turned west on Centinela Avenue to meet Interstate 405 again in Culver City. In 1965, the portion from Route 405 in Lawndale to Route 405 in Culver City was deleted. It was to have been upgraded to a freeway and was tentatively named the "Torrance Freeway."

Until 1998, SR 107 continued further north to Interstate 405. In 1998, state law was changed to allow the relinquishment of Route 107 to the City of Lawndale, with the relinquishment going into effect in 1999. In 2003, the legislative definition was updated to eliminate the portion in Lawndale. The route currently ends at Redondo Beach Boulevard at the city limits of Lawndale.

In July 2026, the City of Torrance approved their agreement to relinquish control of the portions of SR 107 within its city limits. The California Transportation Commission (CTC) will then vote at their August 2026 meeting on the deal's final approval. Unlike the normal relinquishment process where Caltrans must have the highway "in a good state of repair" before it hands it over to local control, the city will instead receive a one-time $11.5 million payment from Caltrans to fix it. After the deal is finalized about 60 days after the CTC's vote, and Caltrans pays the city the $11.5 million, the Torrance relinquishment will become official and only the segment of SR 107 within Redondo Beach will remain. The City of Redondo Beach has not yet expressed interest in taking control over its portion of the highway, but Caltrans will continue to negotiate with that city to complete the relinquishment and effectively decommission SR 107.

== Major intersections ==
Except where prefixed with a letter, postmiles were measured on the road as it was in 1964, based on the alignment that existed at the time, and do not necessarily reflect current mileage. Postmile prefixes include: R reflecting a realignment in the route since then, M indicating a second realignment, L referring to an overlap due to a correction or change, and T indicating postmiles classified as temporary. Segments that remain unconstructed or have been relinquished to local control may be omitted. The entire route is in Los Angeles County.

Location	Postmile	Destinations	Notes
Torrance	0.00	CR N7 (Hawthorne Boulevard) – Palos Verdes Estates	Northern terminus of CR N7; continuation beyond SR 1
Torrance	0.00	SR 1 (Pacific Coast Highway) – Long Beach, Santa Monica	South end of SR 107
Torrance	0.74	Lomita Boulevard	
Torrance	1.41	Sepulveda Boulevard	
Torrance	2.25	Torrance Boulevard	
Redondo Beach	3.68	190th Street	
Redondo Beach	4.70	Artesia Boulevard	No left turn from Artesia Boulevard east, accessible from Redondo Beach Boulevard; former SR 91
Redondo Beach–Lawndale line	4.79	Redondo Beach Boulevard	North end of state maintenance
Lawndale	5.62	162nd Street	
Lawndale	5.62	I-405 (San Diego Freeway) – Long Beach, Santa Monica	Interchange; north end of SR 107; former SR 7; I-405 exit 42A
Lawndale	5.62	Hawthorne Boulevard	Continuation beyond I-405
1.000 mi = 1.609 km; 1.000 km = 0.621 mi
