= Palos Verdes Peninsula =

Palos Verdes Peninsula, California
- Subregion of the Los Angeles metropolitan area
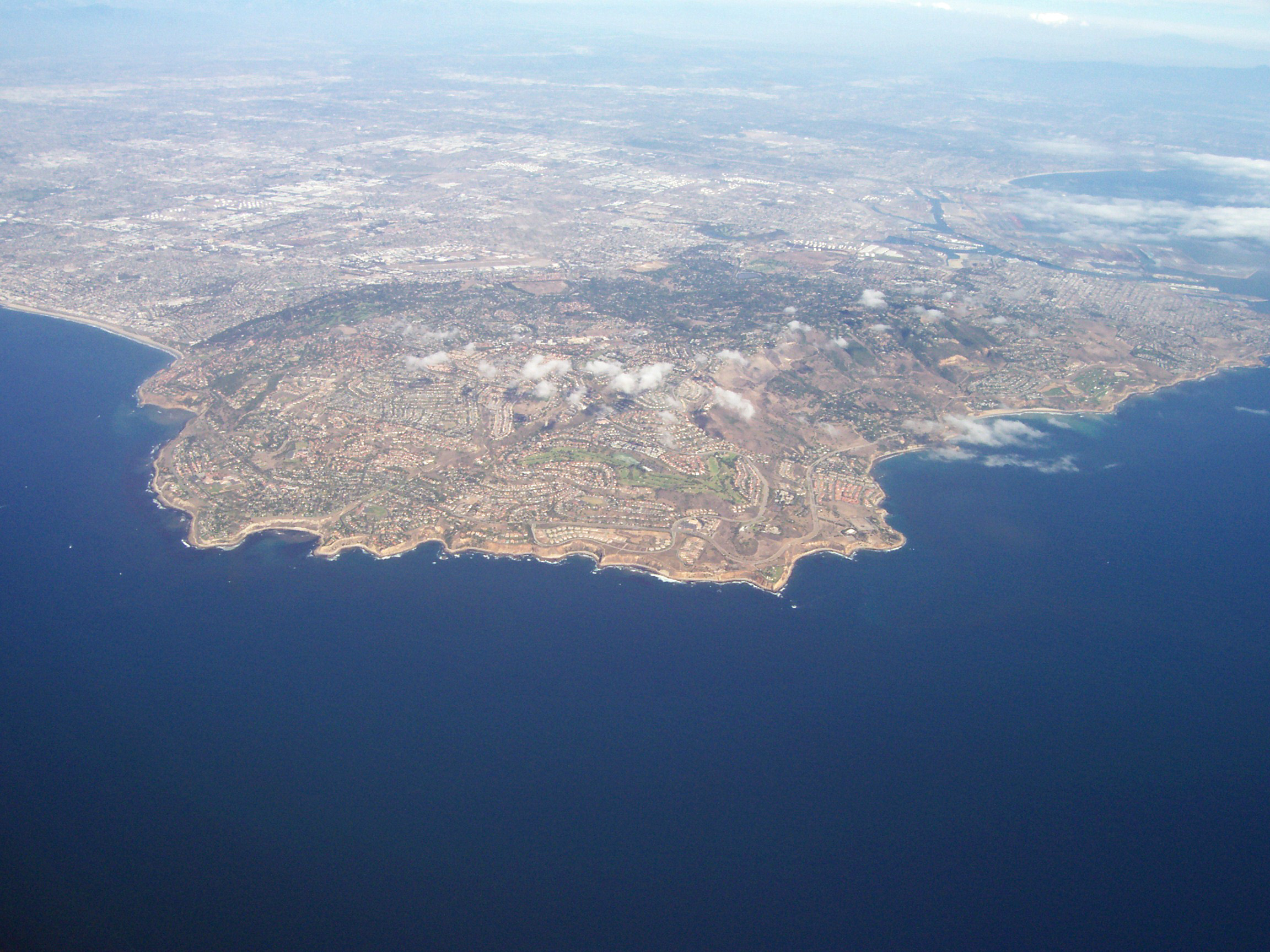
- Aerial view of the entire peninsula with its hills, looking NNE toward the city of Los Angeles
- Interactive map of Palos Verdes Peninsula, California
- Coordinates: 33°45′31″N 118°20′45″W
- Country: United States
- State: California
- County: Los Angeles

Area
  - Total: 37.5 sq mi (97 km^{2})

Population (2010)
  - Total: 65,008
- Time zone: PST (UTC−8)
  - Summer (DST): PDT (UTC−7)
- Area codes: 310/424

The Palos Verdes Peninsula (Palos Verdes (Spanish for 'Green Sticks')) is a peninsular subregion of the Los Angeles metropolitan area, located within southwestern Los Angeles County, California. It is often called simply "Palos Verdes", and is made up of a group of cities in the Palos Verdes Hills, including Palos Verdes Estates, Rancho Palos Verdes, Rolling Hills, Rolling Hills Estates, and the unincorporated community of Westfield/Academy Hill, as well as the Los Angeles City neighborhood of San Pedro.

The peninsula is located in the South Bay region. It borders the city of Torrance to its north, the Pacific Ocean is on the west and south, and the Port of Los Angeles is to the east. As of the 2010 census, the population of the Palos Verdes Peninsula is 65,008. The hill cities on the peninsula are known for scenic views of the Pacific Ocean and cityscapes, distinguished schools, extensive horse trails, and high-value homes.

== History ==
=== Native Americans ===
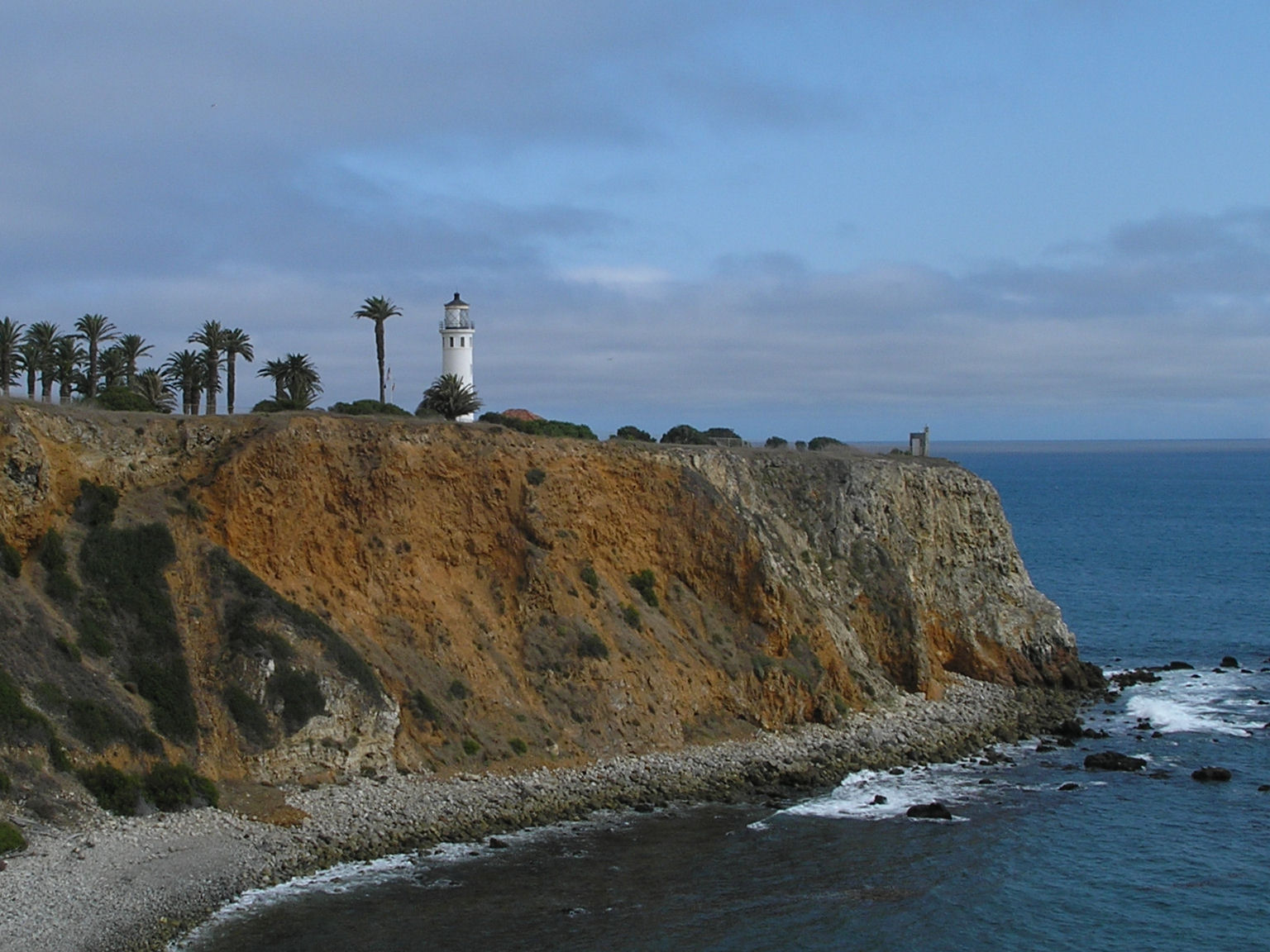
The Point Vicente Lighthouse on the Palos Verdes Peninsula and the National Register of Historic Places

The peninsula was the homeland of the Tongva-Gabrieliño Native Americans people for thousands of years. In other areas of the Los Angeles Basin archeological sites date back 8,000 years. Their first contact with Europeans occurred in 1542 with João Cabrilho (Juan Cabrillo). Chowigna and Suangna were two Tongva settlements of many in the peninsula area, which was also a departure point for their rancherías on the Channel Islands.

=== Spanish and Mexican era ===
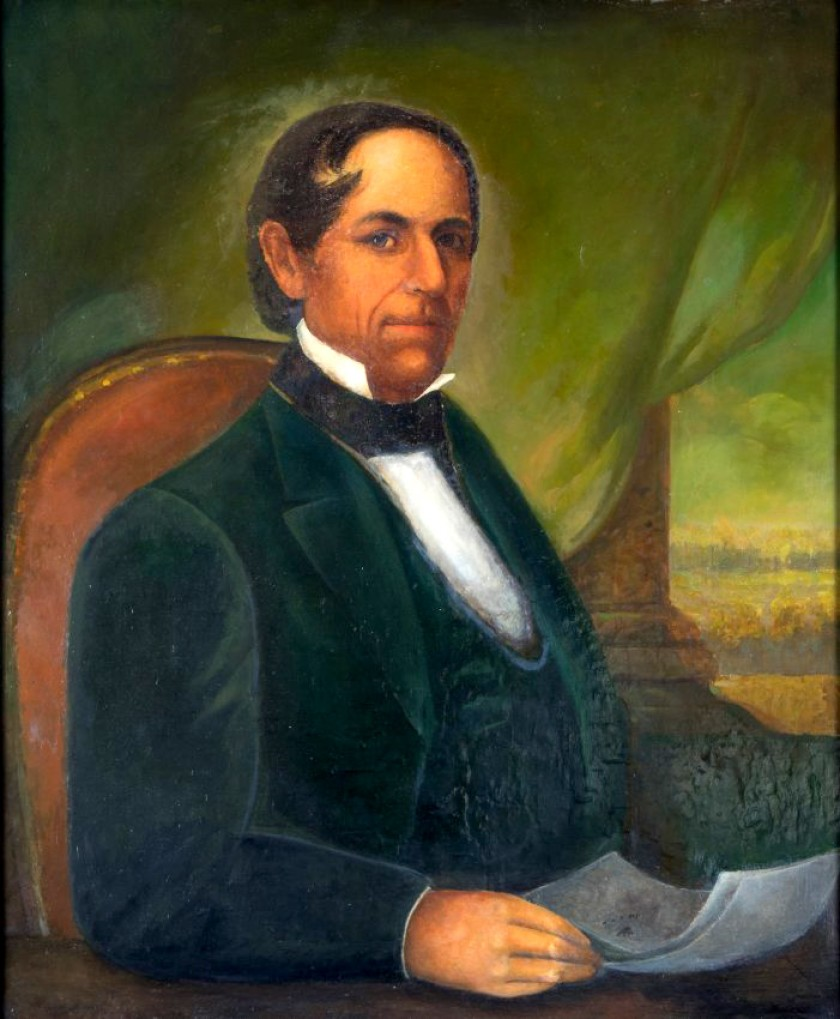
Don Manuel Domínguez, a signer of the Californian Constitution and owner of Rancho San Pedro, which included all of Palos Verdes until 1846

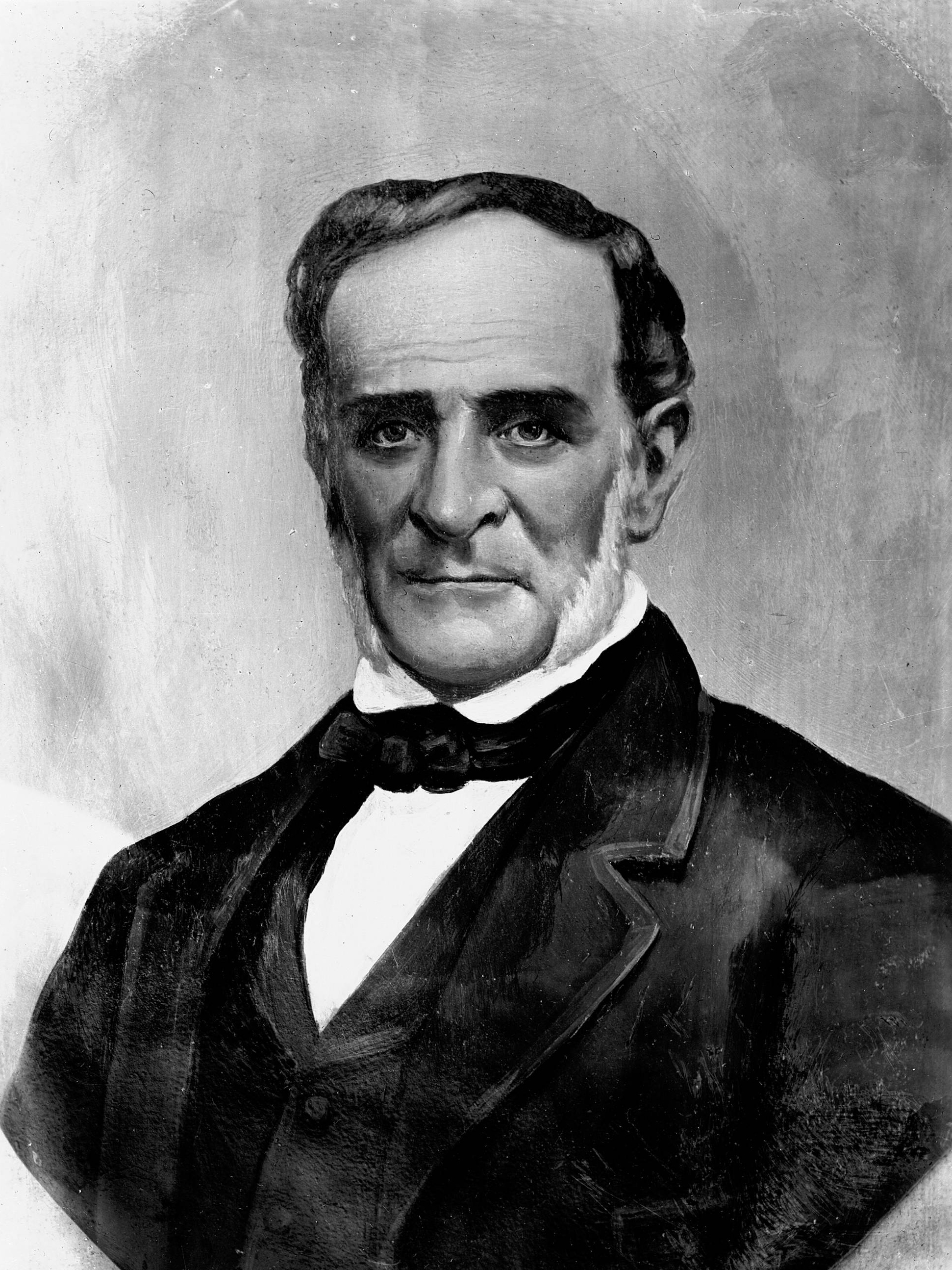
In 1846, Rancho de los Palos Verdes was separated from Rancho San Pedro and granted to brothers José Loreto Sepúlveda (pictured) and Juan Capistrano Sepúlveda.

In 1846, José Dolores Sepúlveda and José Loreto received a Mexican land grant from Alta California Governor Pío Pico for a parcel from the huge original 1784 Spanish land grant of Rancho San Pedro to Manuel Dominguez. It was named Rancho de los Palos Verdes, or "ranch of the green trees", which was used primarily as a cattle ranch. It was also briefly used as a whaling station in the mid-19th century.

=== American era ===
By 1882, ownership of the land had passed from the Sepulveda family through various mortgage holders to Jotham Bixby of Rancho Los Cerritos, who leased the land to Japanese farmers.

Frank Vanderlip, representing a group of wealthy east coast investors, purchased 25 square miles of land on the Palos Verdes Peninsula in 1913 for $1.5 million. In 1914, Vanderlip vacationed at Palos Verdes in order to recover from an illness, and he was astounded by scenery he compared to "the Sorrentine Peninsula and the Amalfi Drive". He quickly initiated development of Palos Verdes. He hired the Olmsted Brothers, the landscaping firm of John Charles Olmsted and Frederick Law Olmsted Jr., to plan and landscape a new subdivision. The Olmsted Brothers contracted Koebig & Koebig to perform engineering work, including surveying and road planning. However, the project stalled as World War I started, and Vanderlip accepted a chairmanship to the War Savings Committee in Washington, D.C. in 1916.

By 1921, Vanderlip had lost interest in overseeing development of Palos Verdes and enticed Edward Gardner Lewis to take over the project with an option to buy the property for $5 million. Lewis was an experienced developer, but lacked the capital to purchase and develop Palos Verdes. Instead, he established a real estate trust, capitalizing the project through the sale of notes which were convertible to Palos Verdes property. Under the terms of the trust, Lewis sought to raise $30 million for infrastructure improvements, effectively borrowing from investors for both the land and the improvements. He succeeded in attracting $15 million in capital, but far short of the $35 million needed. The trust dissolved and ownership of Palos Verdes reverted to Vanderlip.

Vanderlip established a new real estate trust to purchase 3,200 acres from his land syndicate and establish the subdivision of Palos Verdes Estates. The new trust assumed not just the land, but also the improvements made by Lewis. They were not complete, but they were substantial: improvements included many sewers, water mains, and roads; landscaping, parks, and a golf course. They opened Palos Verdes for public inspection in June 1923.

Palos Verdes Estates was organized and landscaped by the Olmsted Brothers and in their planning, they dedicated a quarter of the land area to permanent open undeveloped space.

== Climate ==
According to the Köppen Climate Classification system, Palos Verdes has a Mediterranean climate, abbreviated "Csa" on climate maps.

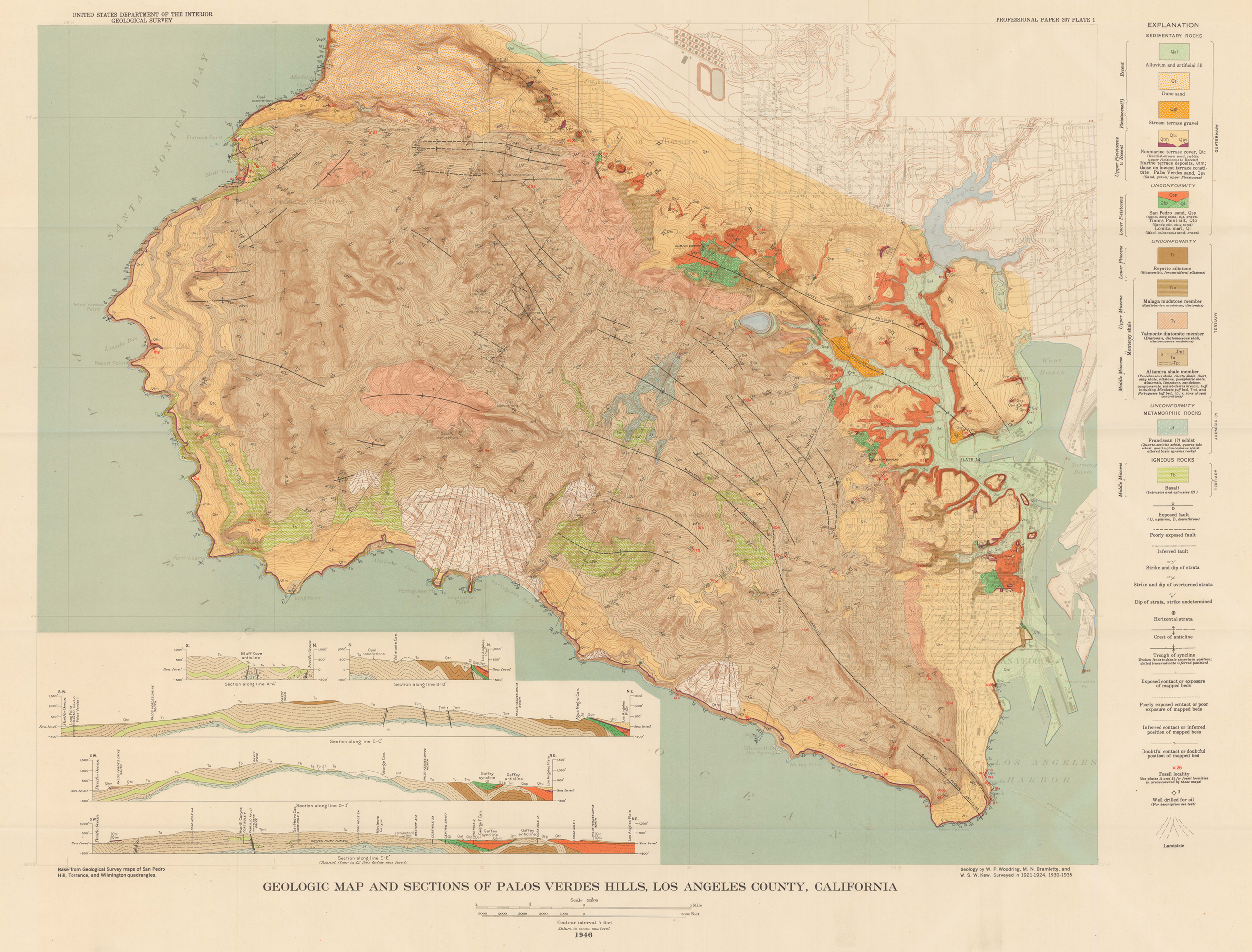
Geology of Palos Verdes Peninsula

== Reef restoration ==
Reef restoration off the coast of Palos Verdes began in May 2020, involving over 30 acres (12 ha) of new habitat. This restoration consists of unique designs and locations of rock relief habitats for marine life. It avoids existing functioning reefs and instead uses those areas as inspiration. These habitats have been impacted by deposited or settling sediment such as sand, leading the artificial reefs to be constructed over reefs buried in shallow sediment in order to minimize potential for the artificial reef sinking. The main goals of the restoration project were to restore the rocky-reef territory and maximize ecosystem benefits.

Two types of monitoring have been done for the restoration site. The first one was geophysical and oceanographic monitoring. The restoration project uses high-resolution multi-beam bathymetry data, which is an instrument that uses echo-sound to measure the depth of water at different angles to create 3D maps of the ocean floor. The team used before and after pictures of the site from October 2019, the date prior to alterations, three different dates throughout 2020, and the final date, December 2021. By 2021, the team used Edgetech 6205 MultiPhase EchoSounder, which sends and receives audible pulses that also map the ocean's floor.

The second monitoring method was biological monitoring. The team used instruments which detected specific fish species' density and size. These instruments also showed the kelp canopy and other marine plants. By 2021, the team was able to say there was a significantly higher giant kelp density compared to the previous three years. There was also an increase in biotic cover, total fish density, and total fish biomass by 2021. Although kelp does function as a habitat and food source of marine species, it is not necessary for fish biodiversity. Instead, rock relief is linked to fish biodiversity.

Human caused factors such as pollution and over harvesting have altered urchin-dominated areas. Historically, pollution mitigation has been overlooked in artificial reef restoration programs. A way to mitigate issues is through assisted recovery and/or passive restoration. Experiments that have included pollution mitigation have seen a 100% success rate of achieving cleaner environments within their testing site. Heavy metals such as lead and zinc have been found in Southern California coasts, as well as DDT. The highest concentration of DDT in sediments in California was found off the coast of Palos Verdes. 98% of sediments tested off the coast of Palos Verdes contained DDT which has contaminated 100% of two fish species, the Pacific sanddab and longfin sanddab. High amounts of nutrients such as phosphorus and nitrate have also been detected in the water. These factors have caused fish tissue to decrease between the 1970s and 1980s. Due to the high concentration of DDT, commercial fishing is banned off the coast of Palos Verdes. Another factor where marine restorations fall short is in accounting for multiple important variables. Some examples are nutrients, light, wave exposure, and temporal temperatures.

Another stressor that reefs and other marine ecosystems face are human population increases. Population increased in California's coast during the 1900s. It went from 200 thousand people in Southern California in 1900 to over 17 million in 1998. Palos Verdes has been identified as a hot spot for sewage found in sediments. Invertebrates, plankton, and several species have bioaccumulated increasing amounts of chlorinated hydrocarbons as they approach Palos Verdes. When there are high levels of pollution, fish diseases such as tumors and fin erosion levels also increase.

== Economy ==
Palos Verdes Peninsula is an upper class area, and the average household income is $231,303 per year.

== Commerce ==
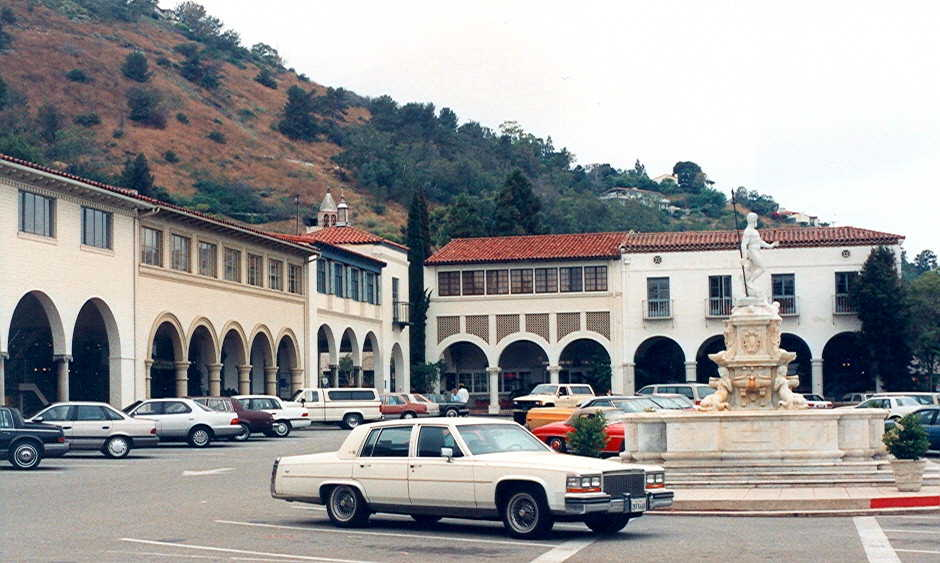
The historic Mediterranean Revival style Malaga Cove Plaza, in Palos Verdes Estates

Areas of commerce include historic Mediterranean Revival style Malaga Cove Plaza and the Promenade on the Peninsula. Smaller shopping centers include the Peninsula Center, Lunada Bay Plaza, and Golden Cove Plaza.

The largest peninsula commercial district is in Rolling Hills Estates, with many shopping centers including The Promenade on the Peninsula with a megaplex movie theater and an ice rink.

The Palos Verdes area has ocean views, coastline views and city light views.

The Peninsula is home to the Promenade on the Peninsula mall, originally an enclosed regional mall with two department store anchors, May Company California and Bullocks Wilshire, as well as the Peninsula Center, which originally had a Buffums department store.

== Transportation ==
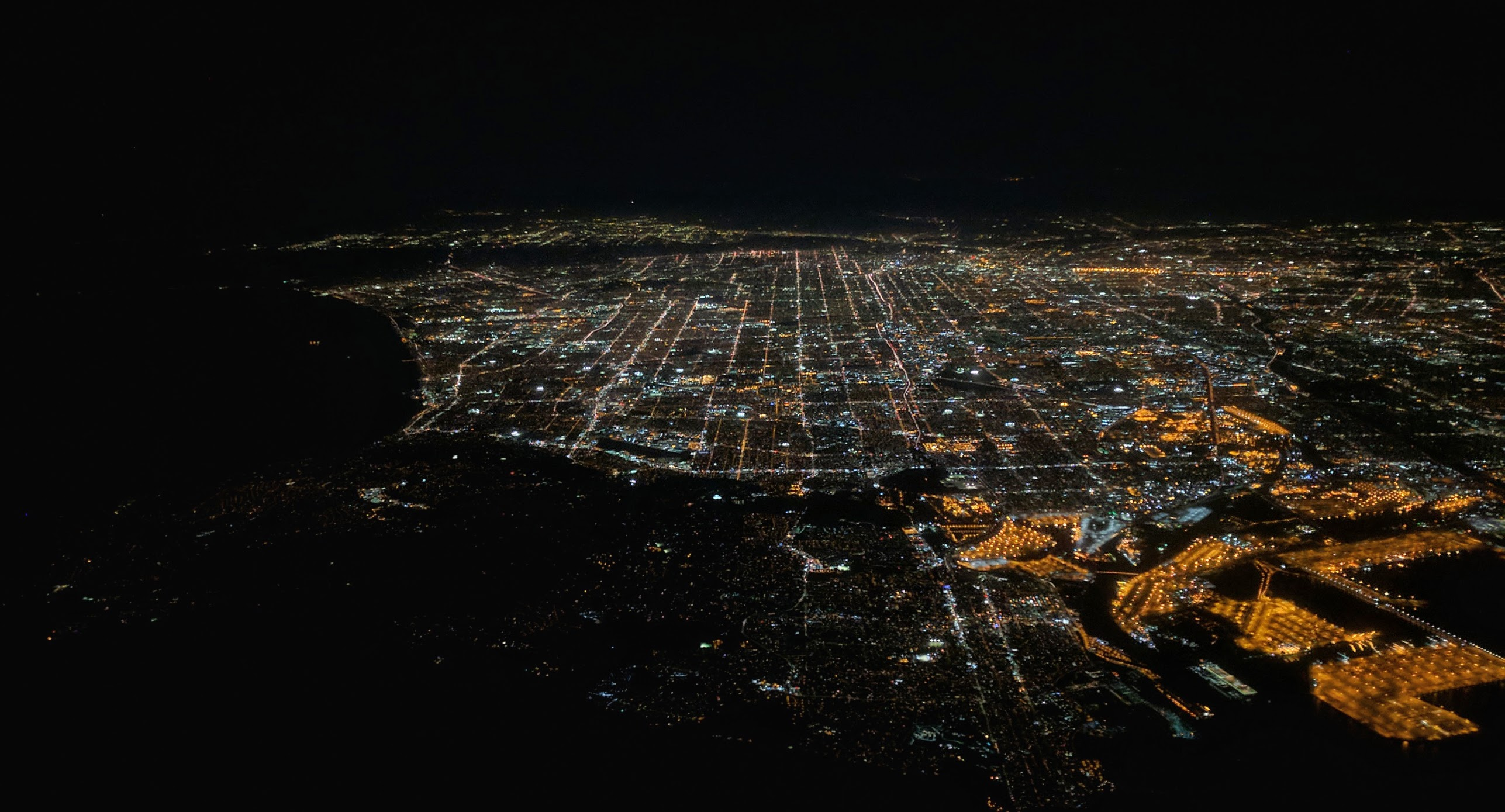
In this night-time aerial photograph of Los Angeles, San Pedro is in the center and right foreground, including part of the brightly lit Terminal Island. The dark peninsula to the left of San Pedro is Palos Verdes.

The Palos Verdes Peninsula Transit Authority provides bus service within and to the Palos Verdes Peninsula. The Palos Verdes Peninsula is within 40 minutes of both LAX and Long Beach Airport, which together provide access to most of the United States aboard all major carriers.

== Education ==
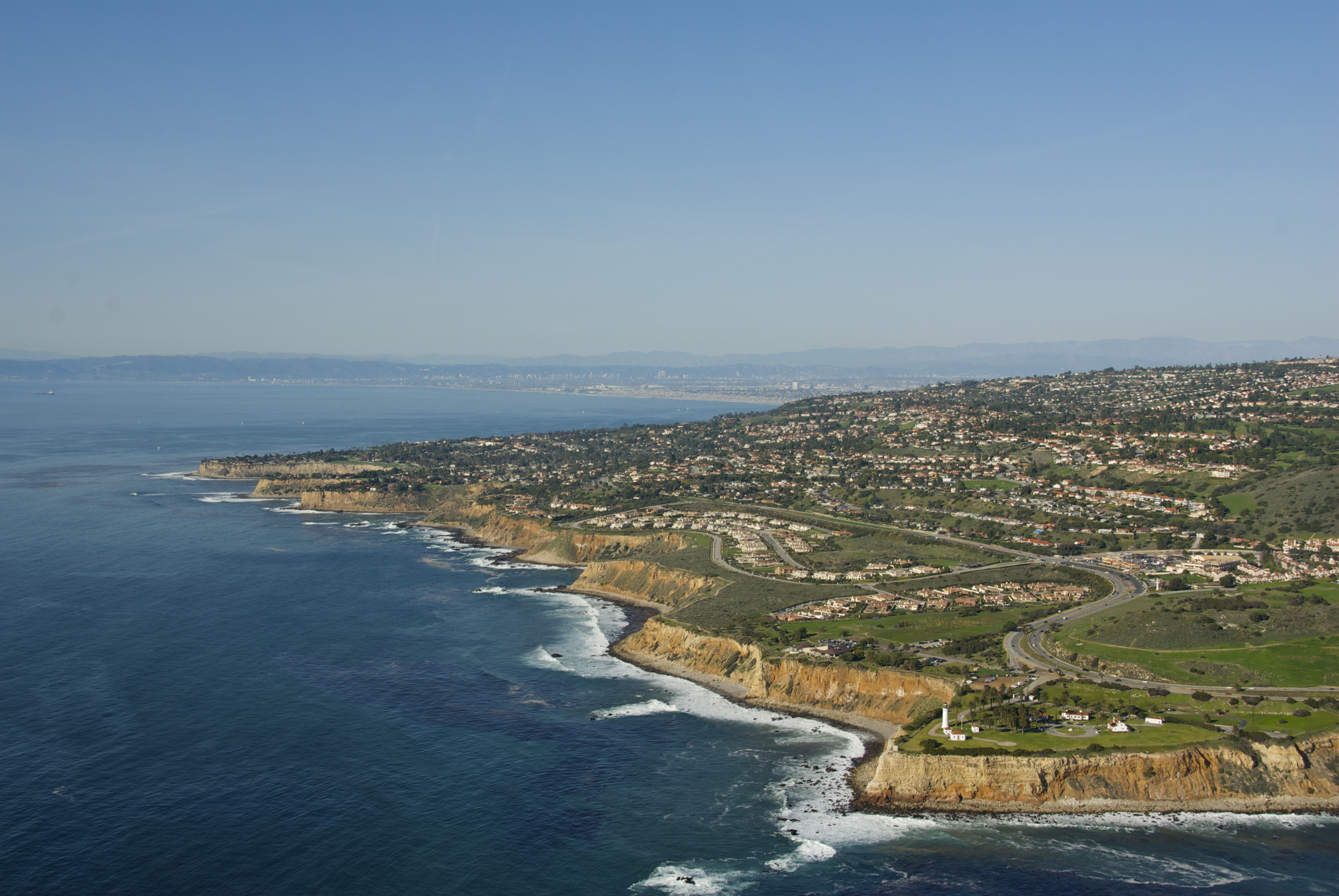
The edge of the Palos Verdes Peninsula extending down to the Pacific Ocean

The Palos Verdes Peninsula Unified School District has one of the highest rated API scores in California and has one of the highest average SAT scores and one of the highest percentage of students successfully completing the Advanced Placement exams in the county. There are three high schools, Palos Verdes Peninsula High School (formerly called Rolling Hills High School), Palos Verdes High School, and Rancho Del Mar High School (located in Rolling Hills). The former Marymount California University, a co-ed Roman Catholic four-year college was located in Rancho Palos Verdes. A private K–12 school, Chadwick School, is also located there. Rolling Hills Country Day School, adjacent to the Botanic Garden, offers a private K-8 education. In total, there are 11 elementary schools, 3 intermediate schools, and 3 high schools located on the peninsula.

In the Eastview neighborhood of Rancho Palos Verdes, however, residents have the option to choose either PV schools or the surrounding LAUSD schools (i.e. Dodson Middle School, Dana Middle School, San Pedro High School, etc.).

Additionally, students are also able to attend the California Academy of Mathematics and Science in Carson due to its attendance boundaries stretching to the South Bay, which is about 20–40 minutes from the peninsula itself.

=== Libraries ===
The Peninsula is served by the Palos Verdes Library District, which operates these three libraries:

- Peninsula Center Library
- Miraleste Library
- Malaga Cove Library- on the National Historical Register

The 40 Families Project based at Peninsula Center Library documents the history of the Japanese-American community on Palos Verdes before World War II.

== Parks and recreation ==
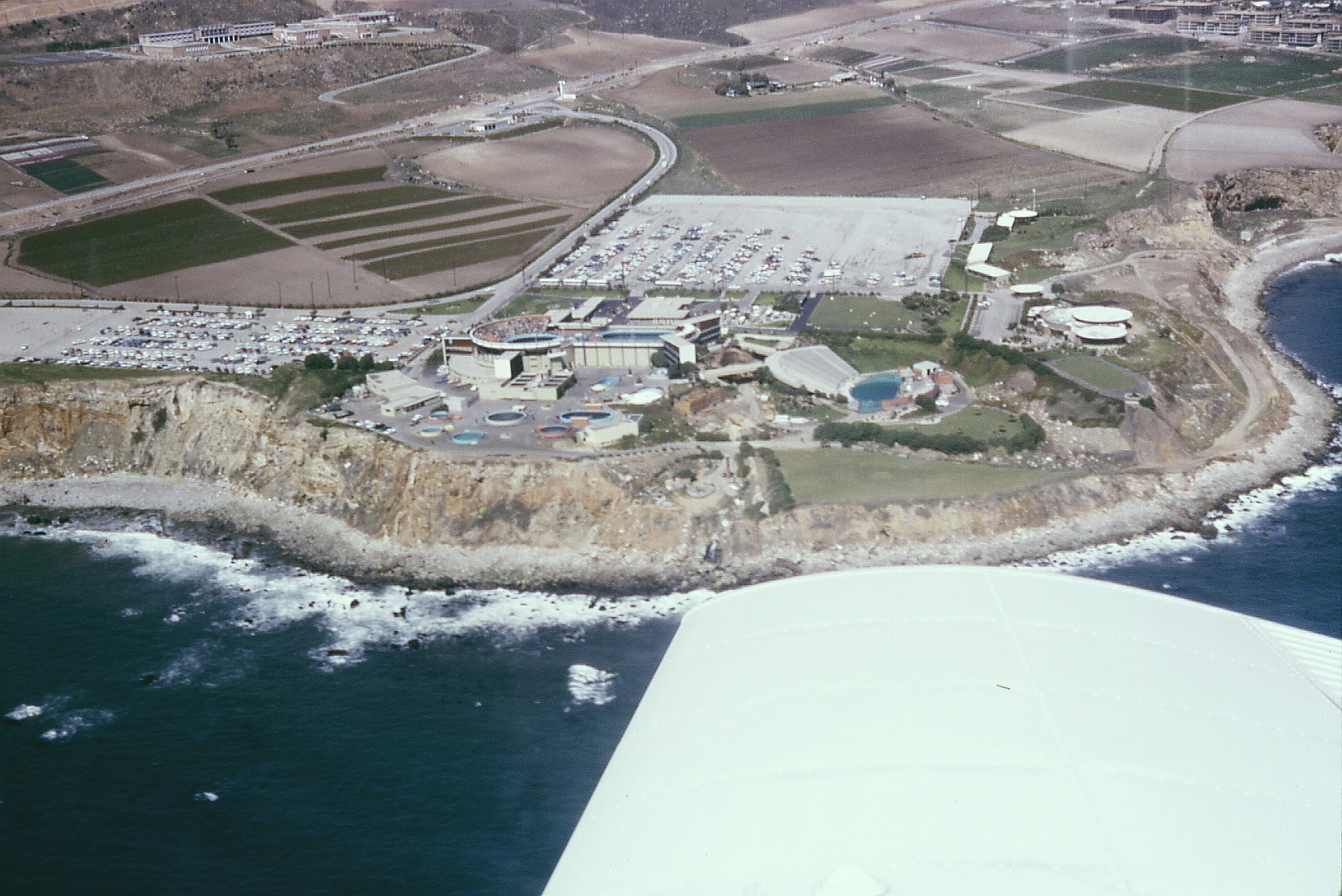
Aerial view of Marineland of the Pacific, in 1965, on the Palos Verdes Peninsula

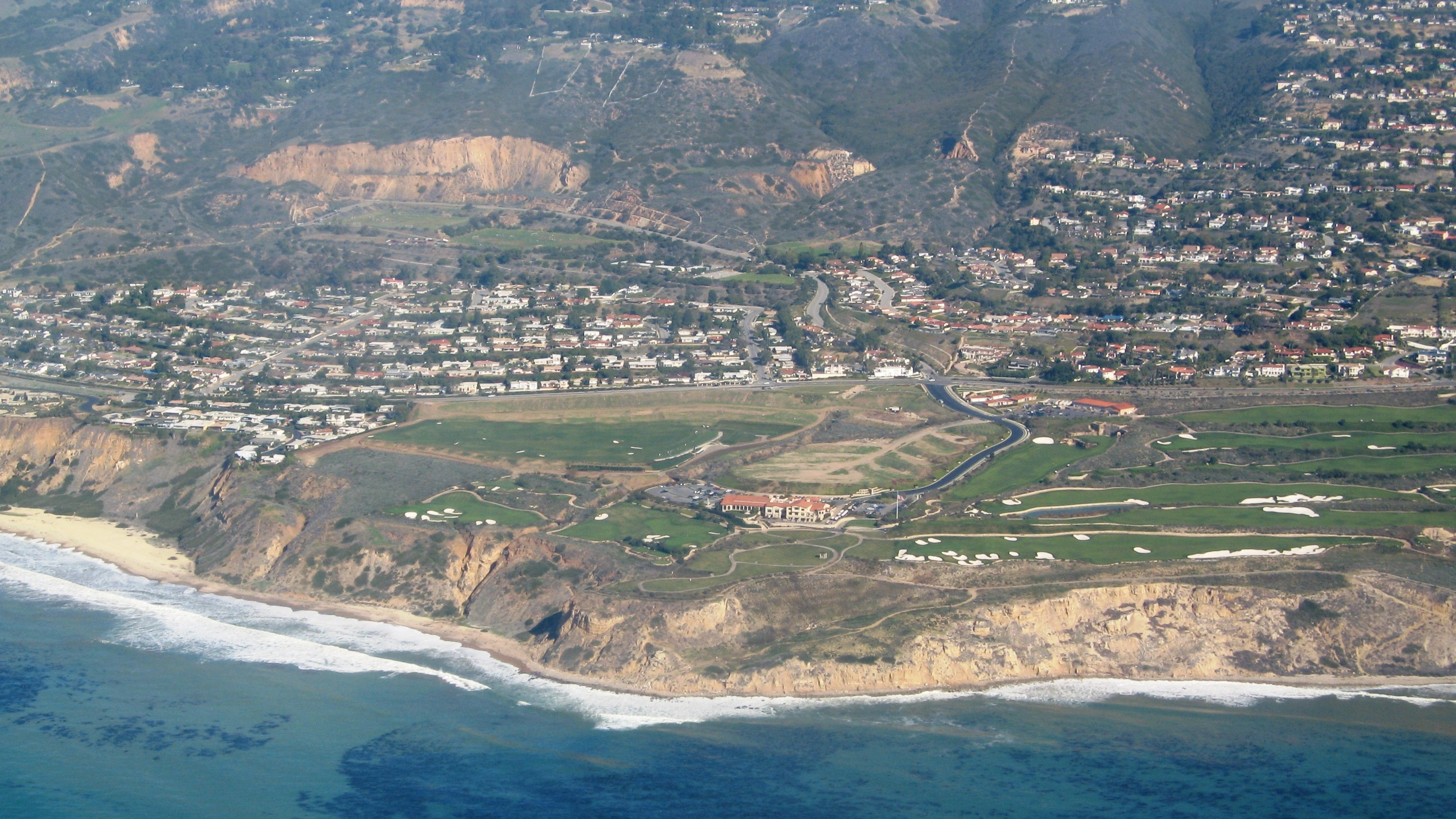
The Trump National Golf Course

- South Coast Botanic Garden – 35 hectare (87 acre) landscaped botanical garden, event venue, and arboretum with over 150,000 landscape plants and trees from approximately 140 families, 700 genera, and 2,000 different species. It is a classic example of land recycling by reclaiming a site that was previously a sanitary landfill and open pit diatomite mine from 1929 until 1956.
- Point Vicente Park is a popular spot for watching the migration of gray whales to and from their breeding lagoon in Baja California.
- Fort MacArthur Military Museum is located near Point Fermin in San Pedro.
- Del Cerro Park is a popular spot to hike trail at end of Crenshaw Blvd.
- Ryan Park is Rancho Palos Verdes's first established park in the city, overlooking a view of nearby island Santa Catalina. Park features include baseball diamond, picnic areas with barbecue, and a community room.

The peninsula is frequented by runners, hikers, horseback riders, bird watchers, surfers, scuba divers, fishermen, and bicyclists. The area is home to several golf courses and country clubs. In addition, nude sunbathers formerly frequented Sacreds Cove (or "Smugglers Cove") until the city of Rancho Palos Verdes enacted a 1994 ordinance that ended such use of that beach.

Palos Verdes surf spots have been in the spotlight many times over issues of localism. The most notorious surf spot for localism in Palos Verdes is Lunada Bay, which can hold any winter swell and has been known to rival Sunset Beach, Hawaii on a big day. Localism in Palos Verdes reached a turning point in 2001 when a civil rights lawsuit was filed after a particularly violent confrontation with Hermosa Beach surfers. Surveillance cameras were placed in the surfing area but were later removed. In 2016, The Coastal Commission targeted the group after "renewed reports that their unpermitted structure [built along Lunada Bay] was being used as a spot for ongoing bullying and intimidation." On July 12, 2016, City Manager Tony Dahlerbruch recommended the removal of the illegal structure after pressure from the California Coastal Commission.

The Trump National Golf Club is a Donald Trump venture with a golf course on the Ocean Trails cliffs. The 18th hole of the prior golf course fell victim to a landslide caused by a leak in the sanitary pipes underneath it. In the summer of 2006, the golf club erected a 70-foot flagpole for an American flag; critics claimed it was illegal, but the golf club was allowed to retain it after a City Council vote.

The Marineland of the Pacific site near Portuguese Bend is currently home of Terranea Resort, a luxury oceanfront resort.

There are numerous nature reserves in Palos Verdes: Palos Verdes Estates Shoreline Preserve, Agua Amarga Reserve, and Portuguese Bend Reserve. The reserves contain coastal sage scrubs habitats, a community of fragrant and drought resistant shrubs and flowering plants. In August 2009, wildfire burned approximately 165-acres of the Portuguese Bend Reserve. As a result, restoration has been done to reinstall native plants and animals to the area.

== Flora and fauna ==
=== Native plants ===
- Succulents
- Trees
- Shrubs
- Vines
- Herbaceous plants
- Marah (plant)

=== Native animals ===
- Palos Verdes blue butterfly
- opossum
- gray fox
- coyote
- black phoebe
- water strider
- western fence lizard
- red tailed hawk
- cottontail rabbit

== Notable places ==
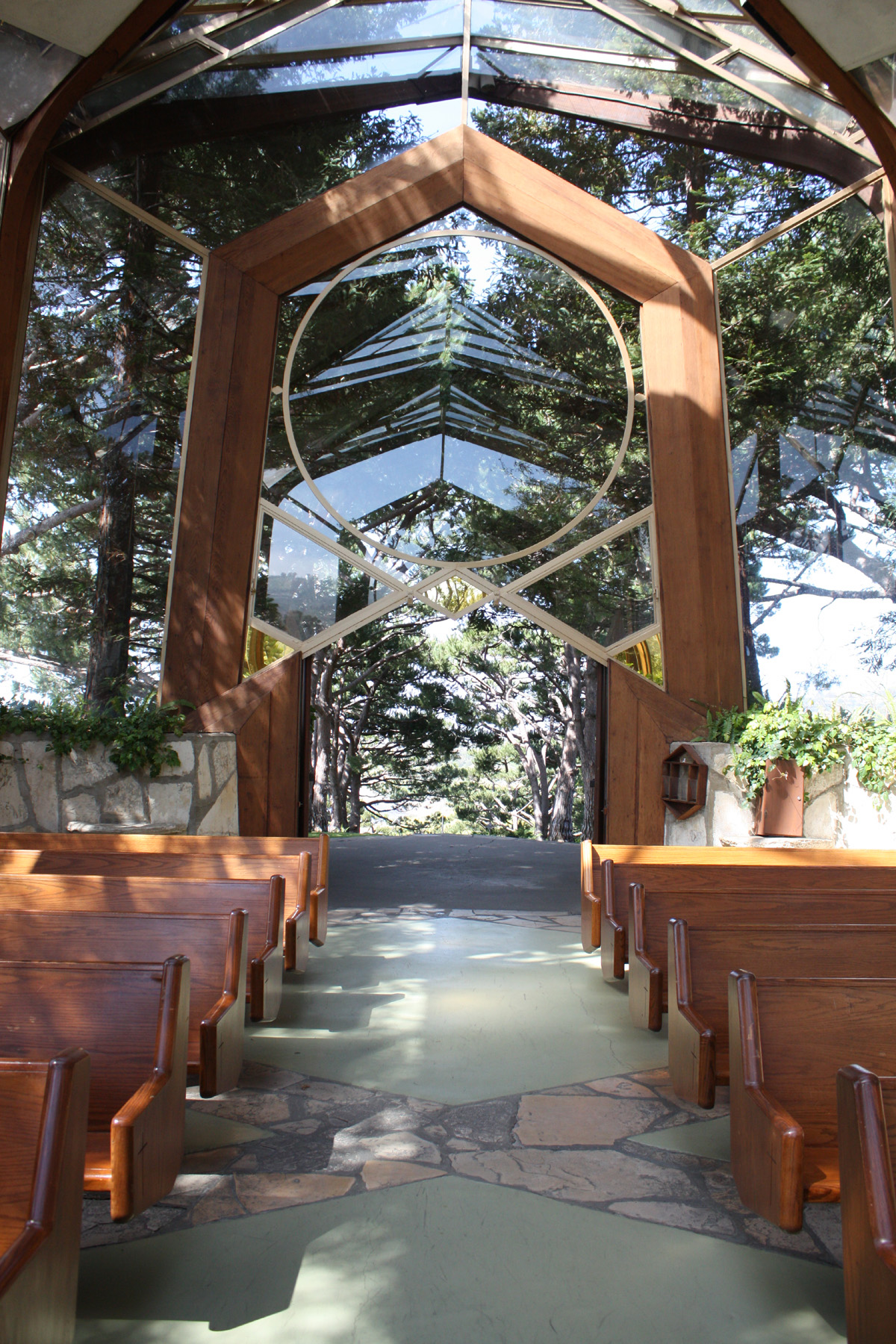
Interior of the Wayfarers Chapel

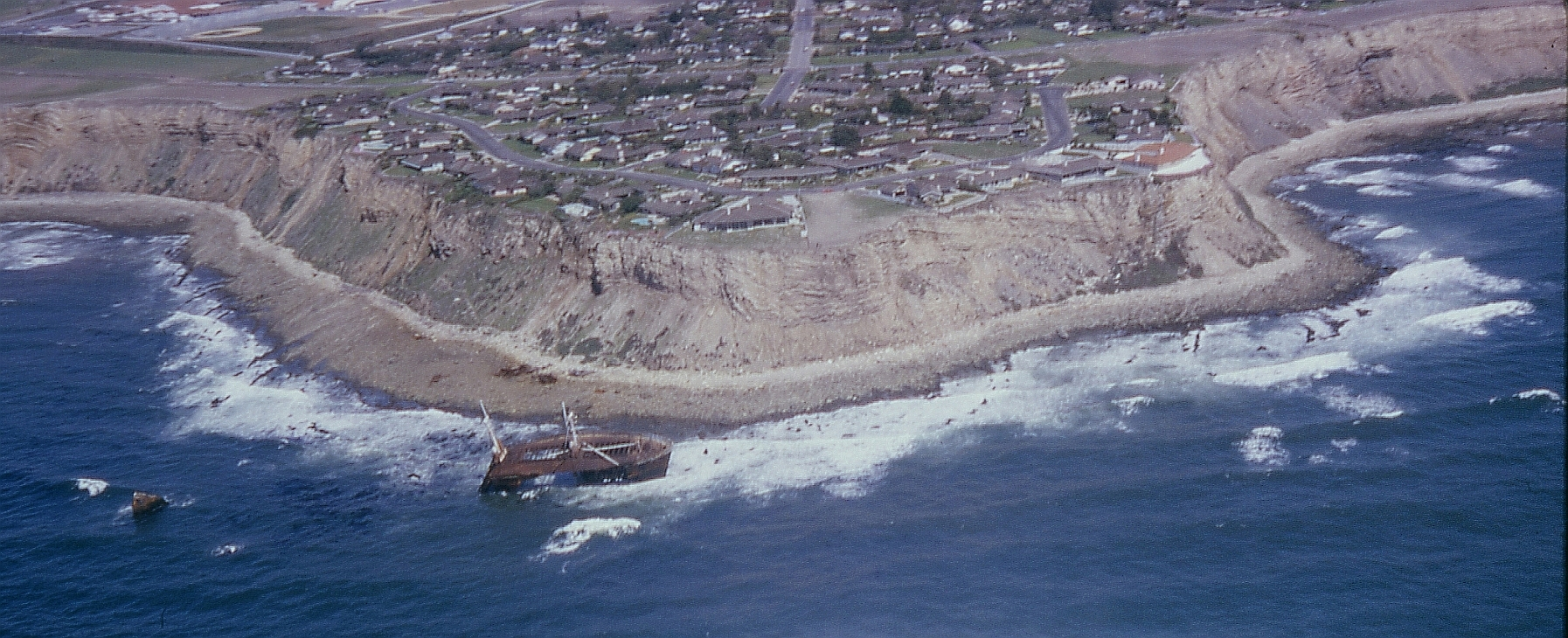
Remains of the wrecked Greek freighter SS Dominator along the Palos Verdes Peninsula coastline, 1965

- The Wayfarers Chapel, a transparent glass chapel in a redwood forest, was designed in 1951 by the renowned architect and landscape architect Lloyd Wright. It is under the stewardship of the Swedenborgian Church, a well-known landmark on the National Register of Historic Places, and overlooking the ocean at the western entrance of Portuguese Bend.
- Portuguese Bend is one of the most geologically unstable areas in the world. Constant shifting of the soil (approximately 1/3 of an inch a day) and rock slides mean that Palos Verdes Drive South, the main road through the bend, is under constant repair.
- Point Vicente Lighthouse is on the National Register of Historic Places.
- Korean Bell of Friendship is located near Point Fermin in San Pedro.
- Marineland of the Pacific is the location of the former aquatic theme park on the coast.
- MTV Beach House. Fox filmed some scenes of its teen drama, The OC, at locations in and around Palos Verdes.

=== Wrecks ===
- The wreck of the SS Dominator, a freighter that ran aground in 1961, was for years an attraction for those willing to hike down the cliffs to the shoreline. Very little is left of the ship today.
- In 2006, the 45-foot cabin cruiser Lady Hawk sank two miles from the Palos Verdes coast due to an engine fire.

== Notable people ==
Sports

- Tracy Austin, former World No. 1 female professional tennis player
- Heather Burge, pro basketball player
- Heidi Burge, pro basketball player
- John Cook, pro golfer, graduated from Miraleste High School
- Lindsay Davenport, former World No. 1 female professional tennis player
- Taylor Fritz, professional tennis player
- Michelle Kwan, 5-time world champion figure skater and United States ambassador to Belize from 2022 thru January 2025; appointed by President Joe Biden.
- Seattle Seahawks head coach Pete Carroll, lived in city
- Los Angeles Lakers head coach Luke Walton, lived in city
- Former pro basketball player Elden Campbell of the Los Angeles Lakers, currently resides in Palos Verdes Estates
- Bill Laimbeer, Notre Dame and NBA basketball star, WNBA coach, attended Palos Verdes High School
- Jeremy Lin, pro basketball player of the Los Angeles Lakers, lives in city
- Billy Martin, pro tennis player, UCLA coach, attended Palos Verdes High School
- Joe Montana, Hall of Fame NFL quarterback of San Francisco 49ers lived in Palos Verdes Estates during off-season
- John Morrison, professional wrestler
- Christen Press, forward of the United States women's national soccer team
- Pete Sampras, former World No. 1 male professional tennis player
- Anderson Silva, UFC Middleweight Champion, lives in city
- Eliot Teltscher, professional tennis player

Entertainment

- Chester Bennington, lead singer of Linkin Park
- Christina Crawford, actress and author of Mommie Dearest, adoptive daughter of Joan Crawford, attended Chadwick School
- Best-selling author and neuroscientist Daniel Levitin
- Musician Hyde, lead singer of Japanese rock band L'Arc-en-Ciel owns property in the region
- Juan Croucier, bass player and songwriter of the bands Ratt and Dokken
- Actor Michael Dudikoff
- Actress Liza Minnelli, attended Chadwick School, a private K–12 school located on the Peninsula
- Author, actor and filmmaker Scott Shaw
- Model and actress Coco Austin, wife of actor-rapper Ice-T

Other

- Christopher Boyce and Andrew Daulton Lee, who sold U.S. secrets to the Soviets, portrayed in book and movie The Falcon and the Snowman
- Galorath Inc. CEO and President Dan Galorath
- Natalie Pack, 2012 Miss California USA, contestant America's Next Top Model, Cycle 12
- Frank A. Vanderlip, known as the Father of Palos Verdes

== See also ==
- Horse community
- Palos Verdes blue—an endangered species of endemic butterfly of the Palos Verdes Peninsula
- Palos Verdes Peninsula Land Conservancy
- Peninsula—including a list of peninsulas
- Transverse Ranges—with the Palos Verdes Hills and Channel Islands a single geologic range.
