= Alondra Boulevard =

Boulevard in California

- Maintained by: Local jurisdictions
- West end: Vermont Avenue and 161st Street in Gardena
- Major junctions: I-710 in Compton; SR 19 in Bellflower; I-605 in Norwalk; CR N8 at the Buena Park–La Mirada line
- East end: Calverton Drive in La Mirada

Alondra Boulevard is a west–east thoroughfare in the counties of Los Angeles and Orange.

== Route description ==
Alondra Boulevard's western terminus is at Vermont Avenue and 161st Street in the city of Gardena just west of the Los Angeles city limits. It passes major streets like Long Beach Boulevard, Avalon Boulevard, Alameda Street, Atlantic Boulevard, Lakewood Boulevard and Valley View Avenue. After crossing La Mirada Boulevard (County Route N8) at the Buena Park–La Mirada line, it continues east, straddling the city limits for a couple residential blocks, before crossing completely into La Mirada and becoming Calverton Drive.

The street passes over Interstate 110 and Interstate 5 but does not have interchanges with them. Previously, Alondra Boulevard had an entrance at Interstate 5, but this was removed in 2014 with the widening of the freeway. Alondra Boulevard also had an interchange with Interstate 110, but this was replaced with the Redondo Beach Boulevard interchange in the 1980s.

Compton/Woodley Airport is situated along Alondra Boulevard.

== History ==
The Alondra Avenue concrete T-beam bridge which crosses over the San Gabriel River in Bellflower was constructed in 1952 and was rehabilitated in 1972.

=== Incidents ===
In February 2020, an unnamed man was killed while another was wounded in a car-to-car shooting at the intersection of Alondra Boulevard and Poinsettia Avenue in Compton.

On November 16, 2020, a dead body was reported at the 12800 block of Alondra Boulevard in a landscaped median. The corpse was highly decomposed, suggesting that it had already been there for an extended period of time.

On November 17, 2020, 19-year-old Carl Lewis, a basketball player for the Sudbury Five, was shot and killed while sitting in his car parked on Alondra Boulevard in a reportedly gang related incident.

== Transportation ==
Alondra Boulevard is serviced by Metro Local lines 128 and 460.
