= Henry Fukuhara =

American painter

Kazuo Henry Fukuhara (Japanese: 福原 一雄, April 25, 1913 – January 31, 2010) was an American watercolorist teacher.

Fukuhara was interned with his parents, who were Japanese immigrants, at the Manzanar internment camp in California's Owens Valley during World War II following the signing of Executive Order 9066. He would later reveal that he looked at spots for potential graves at Manzanar in a 1992 interview with the Los Angeles Times, "Seemed like a joke, but that's what we did."

A prolific watercolorist during his career, Fukuhara would later use the Manzanar relocation camp to teach workshops on abstract watercolor painting to students beginning in 1998.

Henry Fukuhara died of natural causes at a nursing home in Yorba Linda, California, on January 31, 2010, at the age of 96. He was survived by his wife, Fujiko Fukuhara; daughters, Joyce Bowersox, Grace Niwa and Helen Fukuhara; son, Rackham, two sisters, four brothers, four grandchildren and three great-grandchildren.
