= Andrade Corner, California =

Unincorporated community in California, United States

- Unincorporated community
- Location in California Andrade Corner, California (the United States)
- Coordinates: 34°38′55″N 118°22′37″W
- Country: United States
- State: California
- County: Los Angeles
- Elevation: 3,410 ft (1,040 m)

Andrade Corner (formerly Talamantes) is an unincorporated community in the Sierra Pelona Mountains, Los Angeles County, California, United States.

It is located 1.4 miles (2.3 km) southwest of Johnson Summit at the southwestern base of Portal Ridge, 2.5 miles (4.0 km) northeast of the town of Green Valley, at an elevation of 3,412 feet (1,040 m).
