= Del Cerro Park =

Park in Rancho Palos Verdes, California, United States

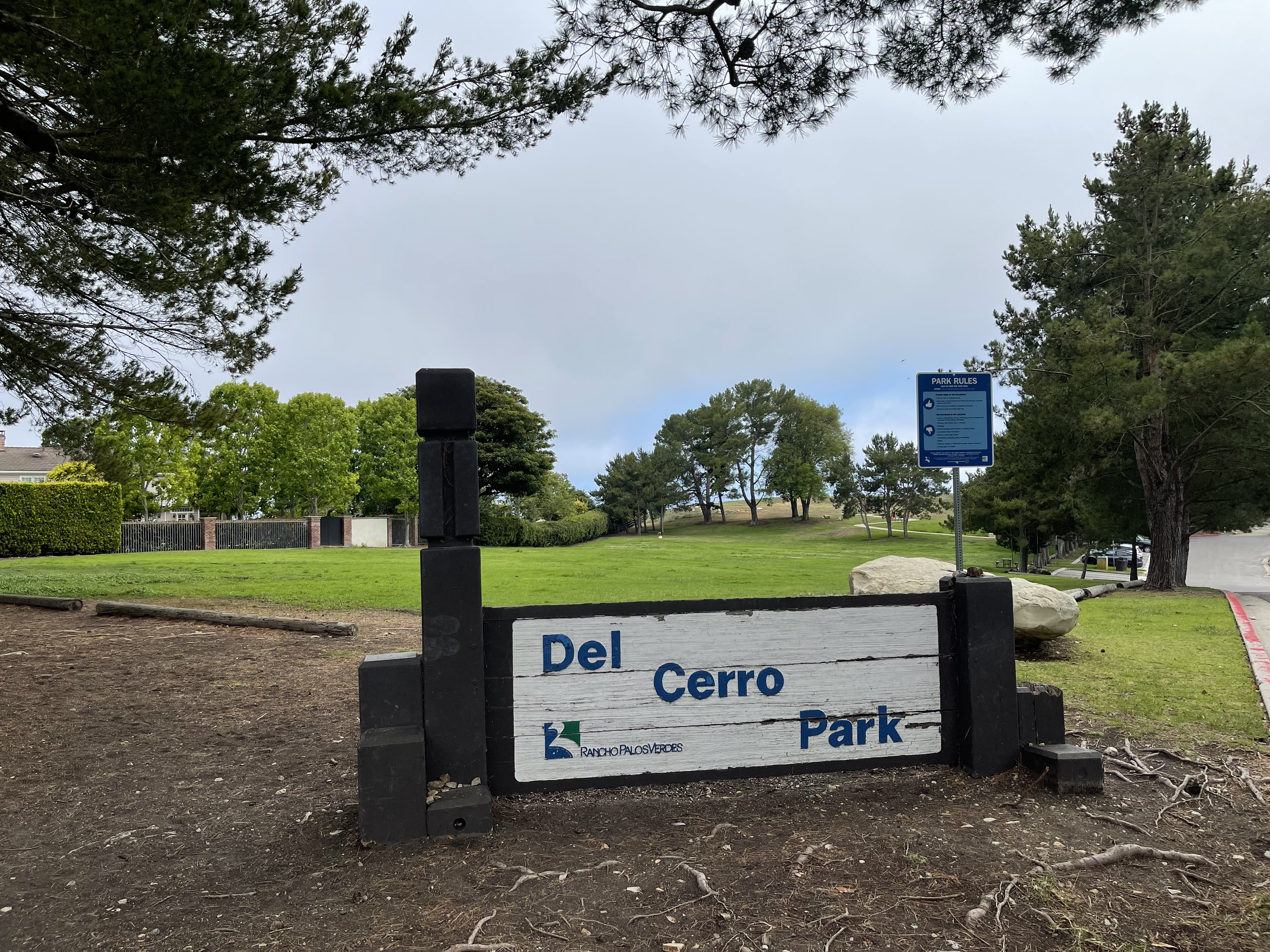
- Interactive map of Del Cerro Park
- Type: Public park
- Location: Rancho Palos Verdes, California
- Coordinates: 33.7571°N 118.3686°W
- Status: Open all year

Del Cerro Park is a public park located in Rancho Palos Verdes, Los Angeles County, California. The park is situated high atop a bluff at the southernmost end of Crenshaw Boulevard. Del Cerro Park is noted for its sweeping views of the Pacific Ocean and Catalina Island.
