= Palos Verdes Peninsula Transit Authority =

Bus transportation provider in Los Angeles, California

- Headquarters: 38 Crest Rd. W.
- Locale: Rolling Hills, California
- Service type: bus service, paratransit
- Routes: 8
- Fleet: 24 buses
- Fuel type: CNG
- Operator: Transportation Concepts
- Website: www.palosverdes.com/pvtransit/

The Palos Verdes Peninsula Transit Authority is the primary provider of mass transportation in the Los Angeles suburbs of Rancho Palos Verdes, Palos Verdes Estates, Rolling Hills, and Rolling Hills Estates, California. Six color routes provide local service, while Routes 225 and 226 both allow for connections in Torrance and Route 225 also continues into the Los Angeles district of San Pedro.

== Routes ==
=== Fixed-Route ===
Services operate weekdays only.

Route	Terminals		Via	Notes
Blue Line	Rolling Hills Estates; Palos Verdes Library	Palos Verdes Estates; Palos Verdes Intermediate School	Palos Verdes Dr	
Silver Line	Rolling Hills Estates; Palos Verdes Library	Rolling Hills Estates; Palos Verdes High School	Silver Spur Rd	
White Line	Rolling Hills Estates; Palos Verdes Library	Palos Verdes Estates; Palos Verdes Intermediate School	Palos Verdes Dr	
Green Line	Rolling Hills Estates; Palos Verdes Library	Rancho Palos Verdes; Miraleste Plaza	Palos Verdes Dr	
Gold Line	Rancho Palos Verdes; Point Vicente Elementary School	Rancho Palos Verdes; Miraleste Intermediate School	Palos Verdes Dr	
Orange Line	Rolling Hills Estates; Palos Verdes High School	Lomita; Palos Verdes Dr & Rolling Vista Dr	Palos Verdes Dr	
225	Torrance; Palos Verdes Bl & Via Valencia	San Pedro; 7th St & Western Av	Palos Verdes Dr	
226	Torrance; Palos Verdes Bl & Via Valencia	Palos Verdes Estates; Palos Verdes Dr & Hawthorne Bl	Palos Verdes Dr	

== Bus fleet ==
=== Active fleet ===
Make/Model	Fleet numbers	Thumbnail	Year	Engine	Transmission	Notes
Chevrolet C5500	1041-1042		2008			
ENC Aero Elite	1041-1042		2008			
Chevrolet C5500	1043-1047		2009			
ENC Aero Elite	1043-1047		2009			
Ford F550	1048-1052		2012			
ENC Aero Elite	1048-1052		2012			
Blue Bird All American CNG	1053-1054		2008-2009	John Deere 6081H	Allison 2500 PTS	
Ford F550	1055-1059		2013			
ENC Aero Elite	1055-1059		2013			
ENC XHF 32' CNG	1060		2013	Cummins Westport ISL G EPA13	Allison B300R	
Blue Bird TX4 CNG	1061		2017	Cummins Westport L9N EPA17	Allison 2500 PTS	
Ford F550	1062-1064		2016			
StarTrans Senator II HD	1062-1064		2016			
