= Point Vicente Lighthouse =

Lighthouse in California, United States

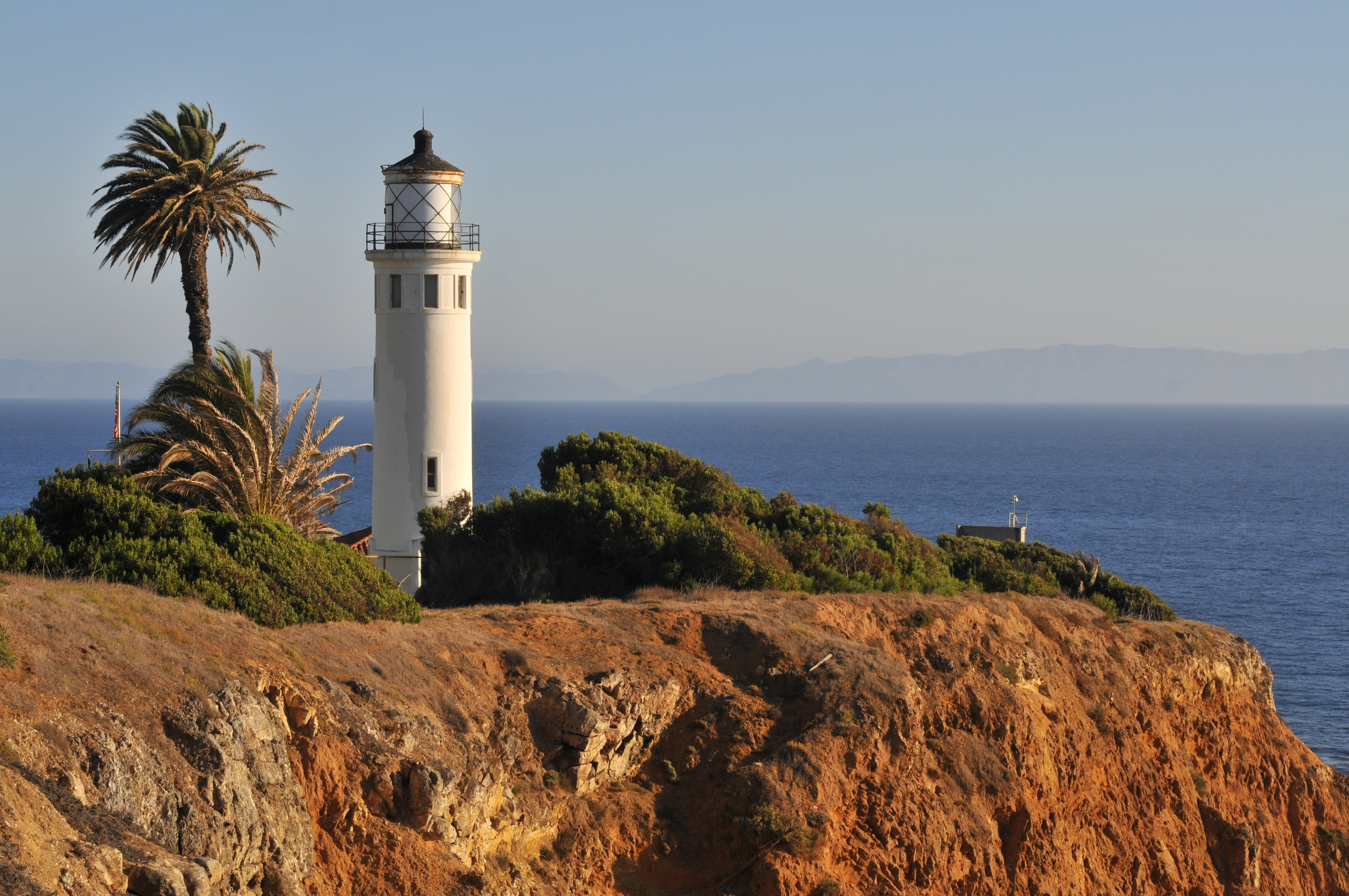
- August 2012
- Location: Point Vicente; Rancho Palos Verdes; California; United States
- Coordinates: 33.741867°N 118.410738°W

Tower
- Constructed: 1926
- Foundation: concrete base
- Construction: reinforced concrete tower
- Automated: 1973
- Height: 67 feet (20 m)
- Shape: cylindrical tower with balcony and lantern
- Markings: white tower, black lantern
- Operator: United States Coast Guard
- Heritage: National Register of Historic Places listed place

Light
- Focal height: 155 feet (47 m)
- Lens: Third order Fresnel lens by Barbier, Bernard and Turenne
- Range: 24 nautical miles (44 km; 28 mi)
- Characteristic: Fl (2) W 20s.
- Point Vicente Lighthouse
- U.S. National Register of Historic Places
- Area: 17.8 acres (7.2 ha)
- Built: 1926
- NRHP reference No.: 80000808
- Added to NRHP: October 31, 1980

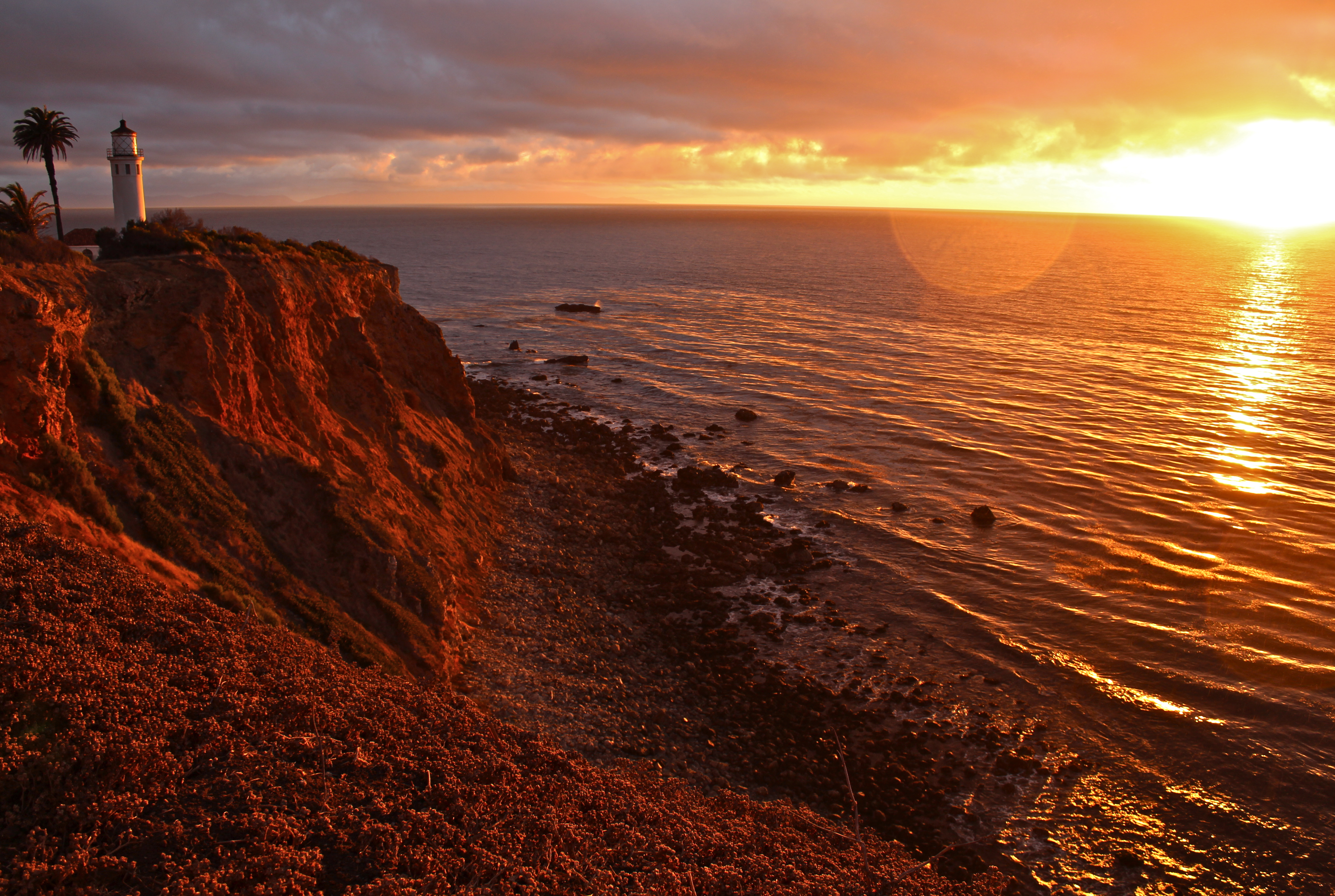
Sunset over the ocean near Point Vicente lighthouse

Point Vicente Lighthouse is a lighthouse in Rancho Palos Verdes, California, United States, north of Los Angeles Harbor, which was built in 1926. It is 67 feet (20 m) tall and stands on a cliff with a height of 130 feet (40 m). It is between Point Loma Lighthouse to the south and Point Conception Lighthouse to the north. The lighthouse was added to the National Register of Historic Places in 1980. The lighthouse is owned by the United States federal government and is managed by the United States Coast Guard. Visitors are allowed to access the lighthouse on the second Saturday of every month.

== History ==
Point Vicente Lighthouse was built in 1926, following years of complaints from shipping about the dangerous waters around the Palos Verdes peninsula. It is situated just north of the entrances to the Los Angeles/Long Beach Harbors. The white cylindrical tower is 67 feet (20 m) tall, and the masonry structure is built on the edge of a 130-foot (40 m) cliff. This places the center of the lantern 185 feet (56 m) above the ocean.

The lighthouse had a classical third-order rotating Parisian Fresnel lens with a width of 5 feet (1.5 m), which had been in use in Alaska since its construction in 1886 by Barbier, Benard, et Turenne, the oldest lens making company in the world. The lens is made up of hand-ground prisms held in place by a cast brass frame. When it was active, the 1.1 million candlepower-beam had a nominal (clear weather) visible range of 24 nautical miles (44 km; 28 mi).

In 1934 the Long Beach Radio Station opened in a neighboring building, which was used to monitor for distress signals.

The lighthouse was operated and maintained by the United States Lighthouse Service prior to that Service being merged with the U.S. Coast Guard, which was delegated all aid-to-navigation responsibilities in 1939.

During World War II, the light source was dimmed to 25 watts to avoid alerting the enemy. The lighthouse was manned until 1971 when it was automated by a remote electronic aids-to-navigation monitoring system, and the radio station was closed in 1980. In 2015, the Coast Guard announced its intention to replace the original third order lens with an LED light with a 14 nm range, replacing the existing light and lens. In February 2019, the lens was removed from the light room.

The Coast Guard Light List specifies its light characteristic as being a pair of two white flashes, repeating that pair every 20 seconds. An emergency light with reduced intensity operates if the main light is extinguished. Since it was removed from the lantern room, the lens has been on display at the Point Vicente Interpretive Center.

This lighthouse once incorporated a foghorn to warn ships during times of low visibility. The foghorn was dismantled in the early 2000s.

== Keepers ==
Head

- George W. L'Hommedieu (1925–1930)
- Anton Trittinger (1930–1945)
- Joseph May (1945–1955)

== Modern day usage ==
The Point Vicente Lighthouse and grounds are federal property owned and operated by the United States Coast Guard. The lighthouse is largely closed to the public, opening every second Saturday of the month from 10am to 3pm.

The US Coast Guards Aids to Navigation Team Los Angeles/Long Beach (CG ANT LA/LB) is in charge of operation and maintenance of the lighthouse. Members of the US Coast Guard Auxiliary who are also members of the CG ANT LA/LB are in charge of the tours and open houses, assisted by the United States Naval Sea Cadet Corps.

In addition to the lighthouse, the property includes a museum and three houses, former Coast Guard personnel residences.

== In popular culture ==
After World War II, a legend arose of a woman in a white gown seen pacing in the tower where the lens was located. Some said she was the widow of a lighthouse keeper, others that she was the spirit of a woman who had leaped off the cliff. The Coast Guard dispelled the rumors of the "Lady of the Light" by saying an extra coat of paint had been added to keep the light's reflection from bothering nearby neighbors, which explained the so-called sightings.

The lighthouse has been a popular filming location going back to the 1958 TV series Sea Hunt, and has been seen in episodes of The A-Team, Emergency!, Fantasy Island, Wonder Woman and V:The Final Battle in the 1970s and 1980s, and in episodes of The Amazing Race, CSI, Doll & Em, and NCIS in the 2010s and 2020s.

The lighthouse has been used as a filming location in the 2001 film Pearl Harbor and 2017 film Dunkirk.

== Gallery ==
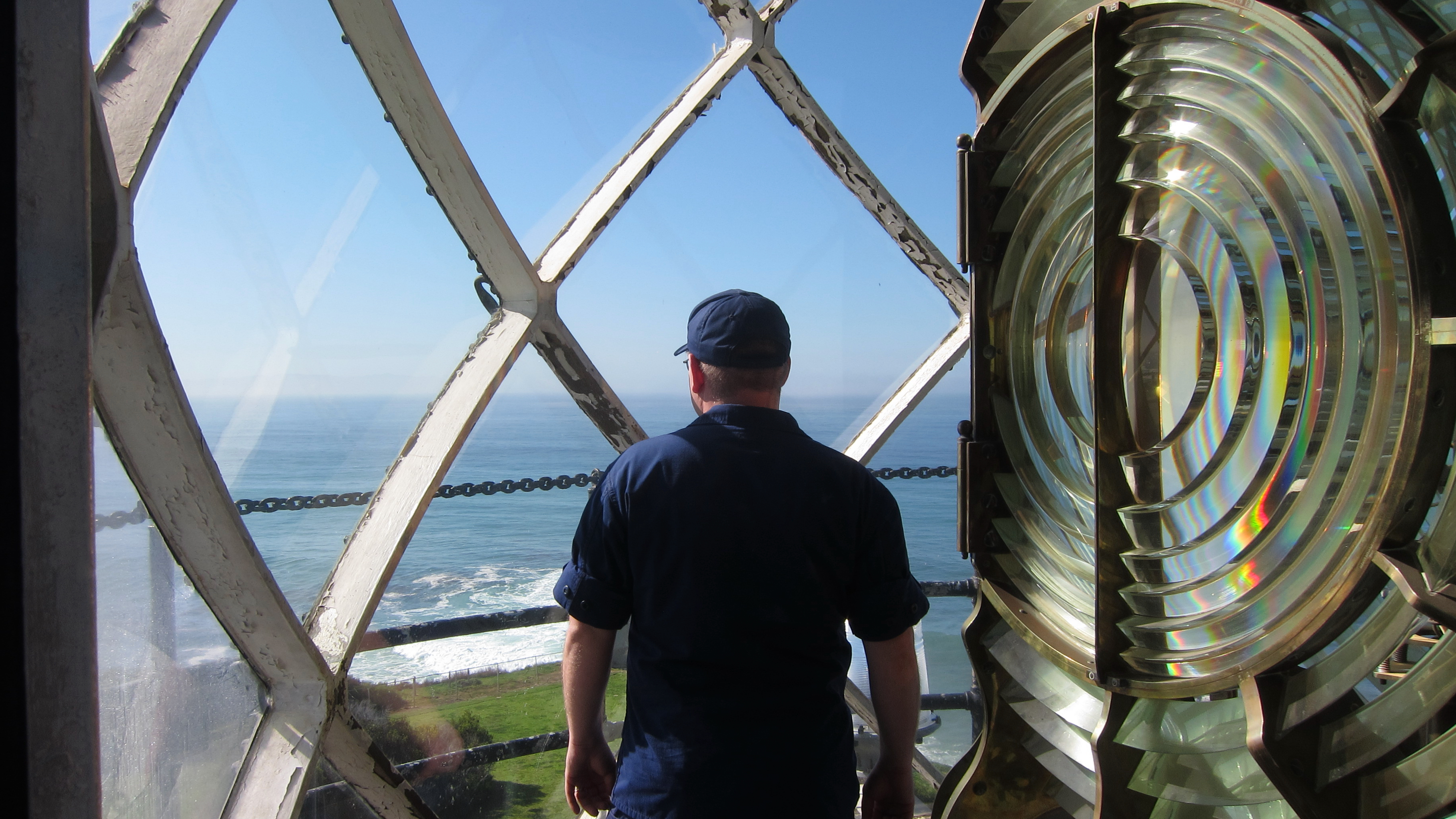
View from inside the lantern room

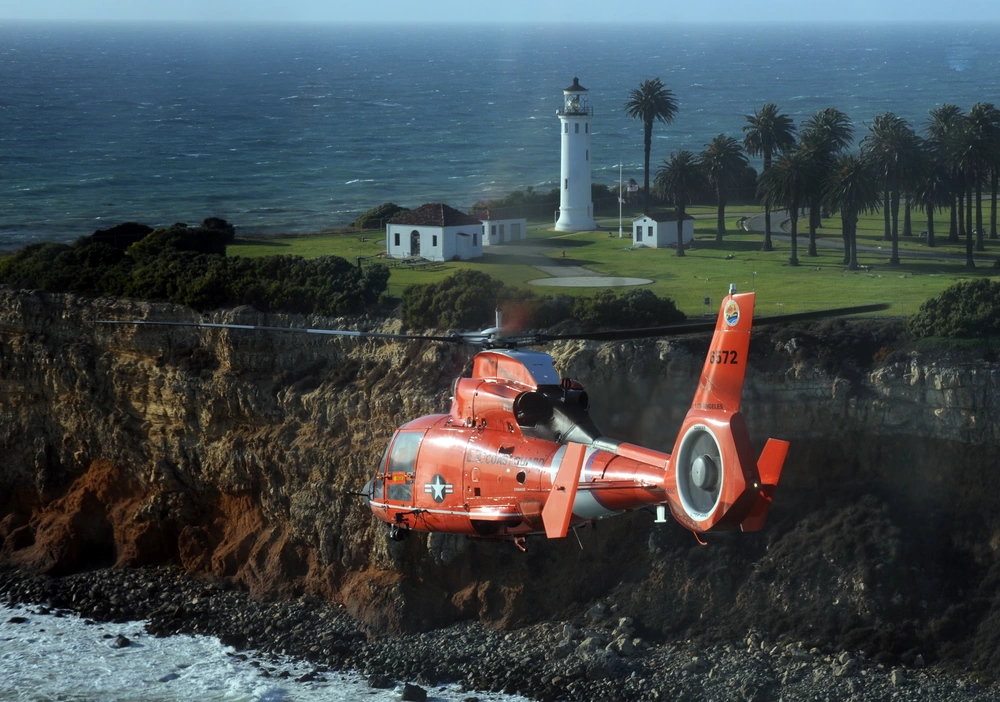
USCG MH-65 flies by

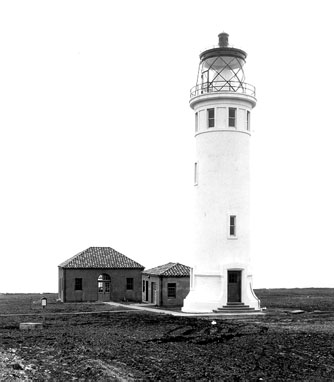
Historical USCG photo

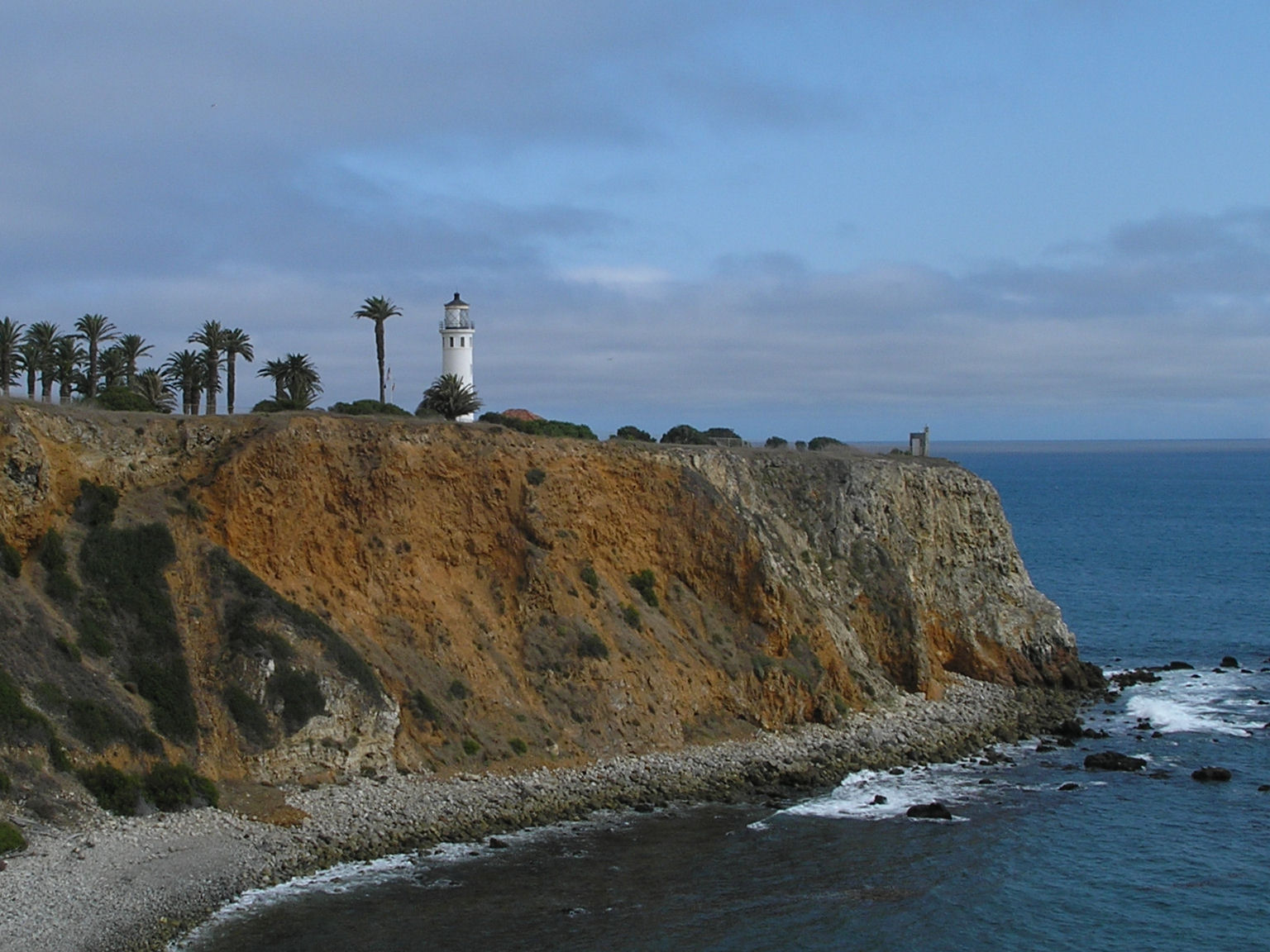
The light sits on a 130-foot (40 m) cliff

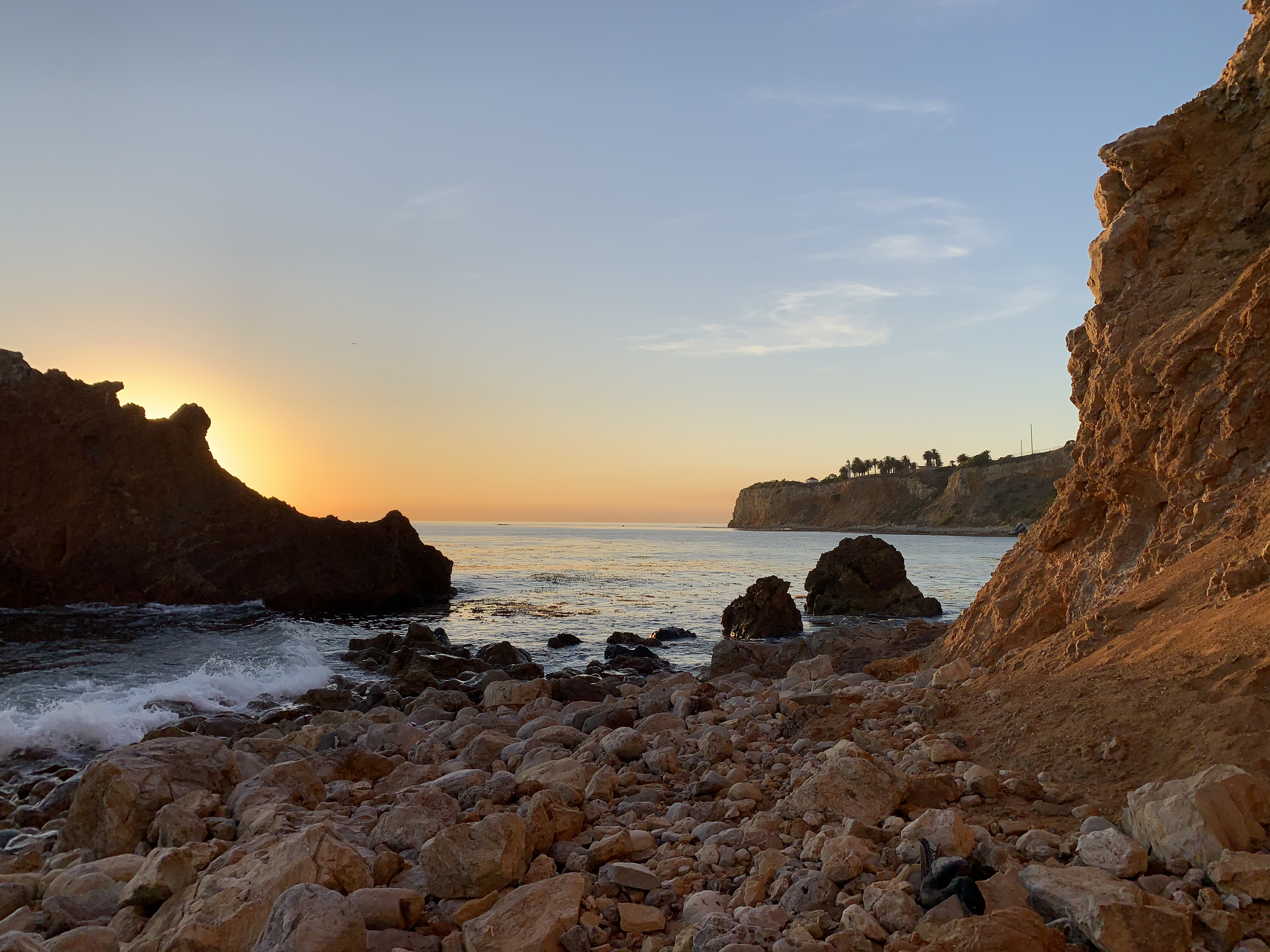
The cove beneath the lighthouse

== See also ==
- List of lighthouses in the United States

== Notes ==
This article incorporates public domain material from the United States Coast Guard
