= VREF =

VREF or vref may stand for:

- Vancomycin-resistant Enterococcus faecium, an antibiotic-resistant microorganism
- V_{REF} speed, the reference landing approach speed of an aircraft; see V speeds § Regulatory V-speeds
- Voltage reference, an electronic device that ideally produces a fixed (constant) voltage irrespective of other factors
- Volvo Research and Educational Foundations, a group of four foundations headed by Jose Holguin-Veras
