= Pacific Harbor Line =

Switching railroad in Los Angeles and Long Beach, California

Coordinates: 33°46′42″N 118°14′40″W

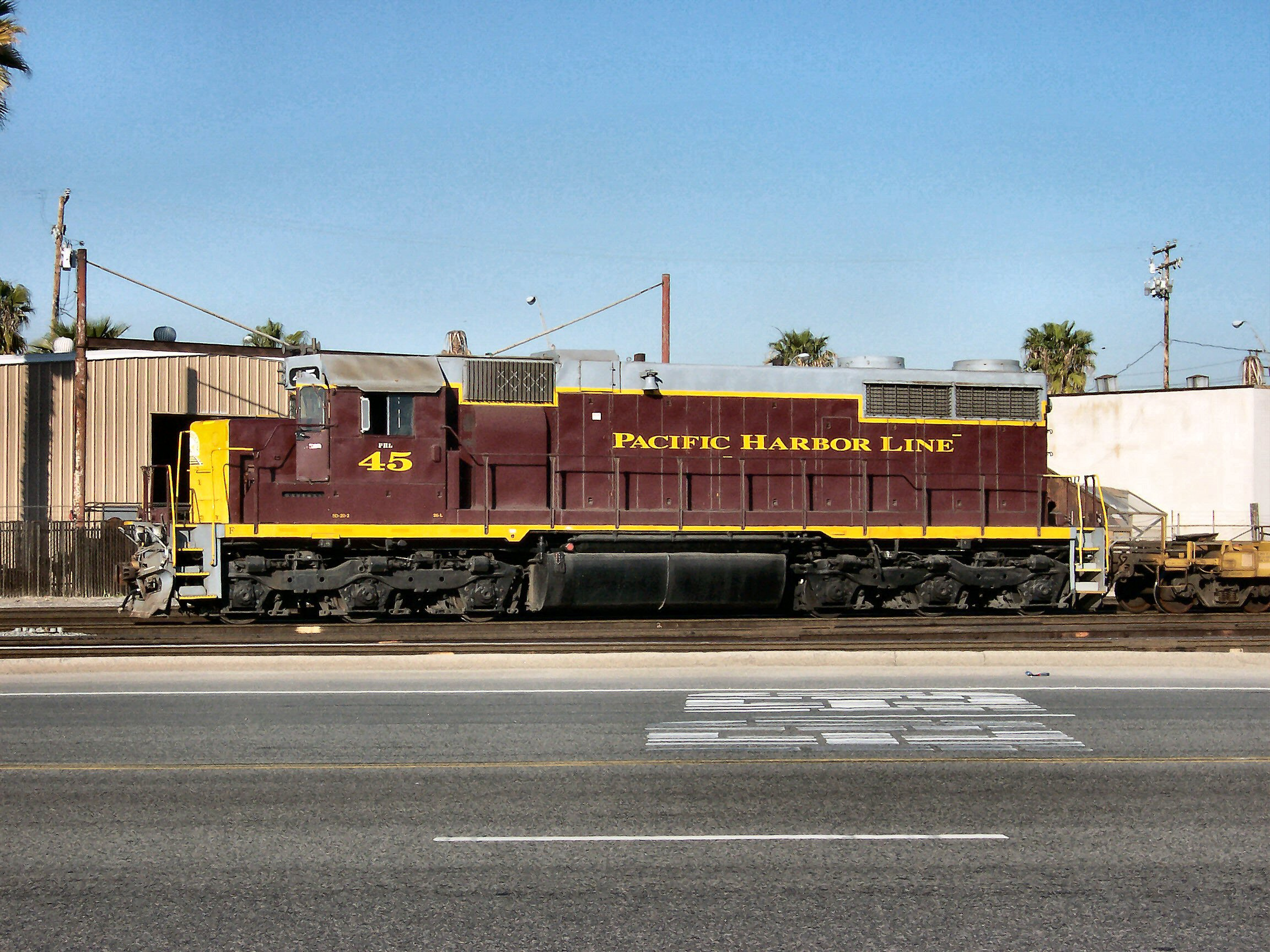
- An SD20-2 engine owned by Pacific Harbor Lines works at Long Beach, California.

Overview
- Parent company: Anacostia Rail Holdings Company
- Headquarters: Wilmington, California
- Reporting mark: PHL
- Locale: Port of Los Angeles/Port of Long Beach, California
- Dates of operation: 1998–present

Technical
- Track gauge: 4 ft 8 1/2 in (1,435 mm) standard gauge
- Length: 18 mi (29 km)
- Track length: 59 mi (95 km)

Other
- Website: anacostia.com/railroads/phl

The Pacific Harbor Line (reporting mark PHL) was formed in 1998 to take over the Harbor Belt Line (HBL). In 1998, the Alameda Corridor was nearing completion, allowing for a massive amount of railroad traffic from the largest harbors in the Western hemisphere: Port of Los Angeles and Port of Long Beach.

The railroad has 18 route miles (29 km) with a web of 59 miles (95 km) of track.

The PHL, privately owned by the Anacostia Rail Holdings Company, operated on tracks and facilities owned by the ports. The PHL was a neutral switching railroad that serves shippers at this large port complex. PHL handled 40,000 carloads of freight a year, excluding intermodal traffic. The Alameda Corridor provides rail service to the port complex through the BNSF and Union Pacific Railroad.

== History ==
The original Harbor Belt Line was formed in 1929 by a joint agreement of the city of Los Angeles and four major railroads: the Pacific Electric (PE) lines, the Southern Pacific (SP), the Santa Fe Railway (ATSF) and the Union Pacific (UP). Each railroad agreed to supply a quota of employees and equipment to provide switching services within a "unified zone" containing 117 miles (188 km) of track. In 1959 the employees of the Harbor Belt Line filed a dispute with the National Railroad Adjustment Board arguing that the employees of the Pacific Fruit Express were performing work on the line which was designated as work for the employees of the Harbor Belt Line. The railroad also operated a joint freight agency for handling smaller station shipments. PE merged into SP in 1965, leaving three railroads to operate the HBL. The ATSF would also be part of a merger in 1996, forming the new Burlington Northern & Santa Fe (BNSF), and the SP and UP would merge into the current Union Pacific in February 1998.

Also in 1998, the HBL was re-organized as the Pacific Harbor Line to create a more even distribution system for shippers using the ports and the two surviving railroads (BNSF and UP). Although HBL's switching operations had been handled jointly, shippers could have problems getting their goods to or from the port depending on where an individual railroad interchanged with the HBL. The PHL aimed to resolve these issues.

Pacific Harbor Line was named the 2009 Short Line Railroad of the Year by Railway Age magazine.

In July 2013, Pacific Harbor Line signed a new five-year collective agreement with the Brotherhood of Locomotive Engineers and Trainmen (BLET), which has represented workers at the company since PHL was formed in 1998. A new five-year contract was signed and took effect in September 2020.

PHL was the first railroad to have its locomotive fleet composed only of Tier II and Tier III "clean diesel" locomotives. An EMD Joule Battery Electric Locomotive arrived in 2023 for testing and demonstration purposes for 2 years.

Dispatching of the Alameda Corridor serving the ports of Los Angeles and Long Beach in Southern California was taken over in 2024 by Alameda Belt Line which reused the charter and name of a jointly owned subsidiary of BNSF and Union Pacific. In 2026, it was announced that Alameda Belt Line would begin serving the 19 route-miles (31 km) and 96 track-miles (154 km) for the ports, taking over from Pacific Harbor Line. Separate decisions by the Long Beach Harbor Commission and the Los Angeles Harbor Commission approved contracts for switching by Alameda Belt Line for both harbors in 2026.

== Accidents and incidents ==
- On March 31, 2020, Eduardo Moreno attempted to crash a PHL train into the hospital ship USNS Mercy, which was in the Port of Los Angeles to provide Los Angeles with additional hospital capacity during the COVID-19 pandemic in California, but the train stopped approximately 250 yards (230 m) from the ship.

Preceded by Twin Cities and Western Railroad	Short Line Railroad of the Year; 2009	Succeeded by Greenville & Western Railway
