= Streetcars in Long Beach =

The Pacific Electric Railway established streetcar services in Long Beach in 1902. Unlike other cities where Pacific Electric operated local streetcars, Long Beach's system did not predate the company's services. Long Beach's network of streetcars peaked around 1911 with over 30 miles (48 km) of tracks throughout the city. Local services were discontinued in 1940, but interurban service to Los Angeles persisted until 1961. The route of the former main interurban line was rebuilt in the late 1980s as the Metro Blue Line, which operates at-grade with car traffic for a portion of its length.

== First generation streetcars ==
Horsecars connected the Willmore neighborhood of Long Beach to Wilmington via the colloquially-named Get Out and Push Railroad, with service beginning in 1882. The route was rebuilt as a steam railroad in 1885 and sold to the Southern Pacific Railroad in 1887.

=== Long Beach Line and American Avenue Local ===
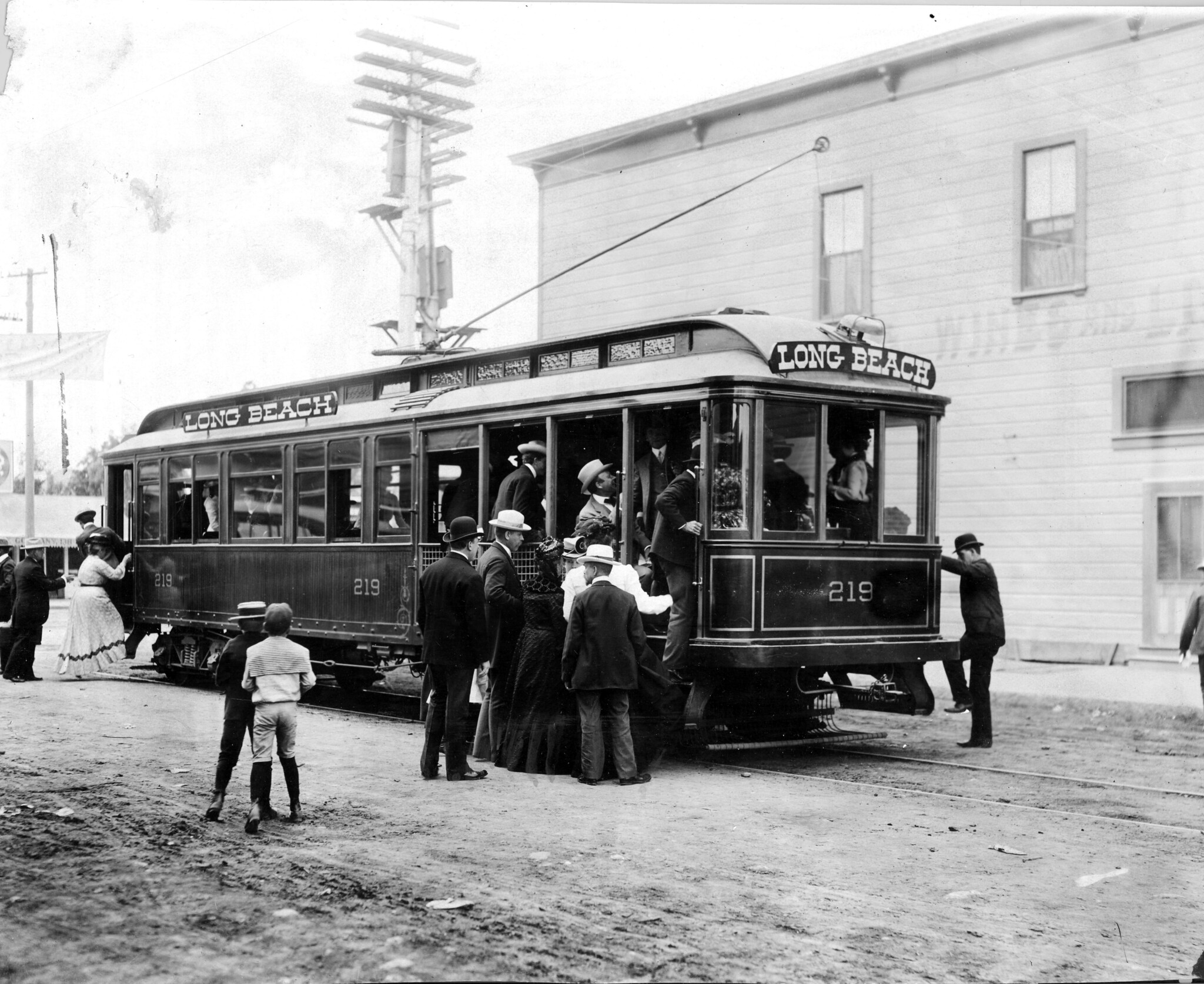
The first day of interurban service in Long Beach, July 4, 1902

The Long Beach Line was established between Los Angeles and Long Beach in 1902 as the city's first interurban electric railway. Local service was established over the route as far north as the junction with the Newport Beach Line and designated the American Avenue Line (the name of Long Beach Boulevard at the time). Dedicated local runs were discontinued in June 1935, and interurban cars would make local stops at the beginning or end of the runs. All Red Car service ended on April 9, 1961.

=== Ocean Avenue–Alamitos Heights Local ===
The first streetcar line constructed in the city, tracks ran on Ocean as far east as Esperanza Street in 1902, then to Mira Mar Avenue in 1904. Early interurban runs would terminate service along this local line. Pacific Electric landscaped the road as a term of the franchise. After October 15, 1912, the line was run through to the East Seventh Street Line, creating a loop. Service was abandoned after June 7, 1915. This prompted the laying of new tracks on Olive Avenue that year.

=== East First Street–Broadway Local Line ===
Pacific Electric won the franchise in 1901 to build this line, mostly to deny Los Angeles Traction Company access to the market. By 1911, it was operating in a loop with the East Seventh Street Line. The tracks on First was abandoned later that year, with the rails recycled to double-track East Third Street.

=== Seaside Park Line ===
This streetcar line opened on March 29, 1904. It ran from the Seaside Park tract of the Seaside Water Company to central Long Beach; cars terminated at Seaside Boulevard and Alpine Avenue and ran on Alpine and Ocean to American. Interurban trains provided some local service by 1911. Until 1915 cars were through-routed with the Alamitos Bay (later Seal Beach) Local. Construction of the concrete channel for the Los Angeles River disrupted service beginning in June 1920. The replacement route was more circuitous, running from Seaside and Alpine via Seaside, Pico, Seventh, Morgan, and Ocean. Service was reduced to a franchise car starting in July 1922, and was outright discontinued January 12, 1928.

=== Long Beach–Seal Beach Via Broadway–Belmont Shores Local Line ===
Tracks along the shore had reached Alamitos Bay by 1904. By 1911, cars originated at 73rd Place and Ocean Ave and ran inbound on Ocean, Broadway, Esperanza, Third, Pine, and Ocean to be through-routed with the Seaside Park Line. The line was extended to Seal Beach station on the Balboa Line in 1913. The new private trestle over Alamitos Bay extended service into Orange County, the only local Long Beach service to do so. The service was split from the Seaside Park Line in 1915, instead operating though downtown Long Beach via a loop route. It operated until February 24, 1940, when it was reduced to a single daily franchise car and discontinued outright that October.

=== Magnolia Avenue Local ===
Pacific Electric constructed the line between February and June 1904. It ran primarily on 14th Street and Magnolia Avenue. It was through routed with the Pine Avenue Local until May 1916, and briefly with the American Avenue line between 1920 and 1921. The line served as an independent service until June 24, 1928.

=== East Third Street ===
Built in 1904, the line formed part of the interurban Wilmington route. It operated independently until 1910. This double track route formed the basis of several east–west routes in the city. It was abandoned in 1940.

=== Pine Avenue Local ===
Constructed in 1906, the Pine Avenue Local was generally through-routed with the Magnolia Avenue Local, forming a loop. The line suddenly ceased service on July 4, 1924 due to power issues throughout the system — it would not be restarted and the line was abandoned.

=== East Seventh Street Local ===
The second major east–west local line in Long Beach opened on June 17, 1909, along Seventh Street to Alamitos Avenue. Tracks were extended further east to Redondo in 1910, spurring development in the area. By the following year, cars continued on Redondo and were through-routed with the East First Street Line as a loop service. The line was also double tracked at this time. When the East First Line was abandoned in 1911, the line was through-routed to the Ocean Avenue Local Line via Redondo. Through-routing changed to the East Long Beach-North Long Beach line between 1914 and 1916 before becoming an independent service. (East Long Beach-North Long Beach line routing was attempted again briefly in 1920.) It operated until February 24, 1940, when service was reduced to a single daily franchise car and discontinued outright that October.

=== Municipal Docks Line ===
This local line's beginnings are not well documented, but are likely related to Pacific Electric's access to freight operations at the dock. Passenger service was through routed to American Avenue and operated between about 1912 and 1915.

=== Long Beach–Naples Junction Via Broadway–Belmont Shore–Second Street Local ===
Among the last services established in the city, service began by October 1924 at the behest of local real estate promoters who subsidized the line. Cars ran on Pine, Third, Olive, Broadway, a private right-of-way, Livingston, and Second to the Naples Junction of the Newport Beach Line. It operated until February 24, 1940, when it was reduced to a single daily franchise car and discontinued outright that October.

== Second generation light rail ==
Blue Line train at Downtown Long Beach station, February 2008

Following the success of light rail conversions in the 1980s, the last Pacific Electric corridor to operate was the first planned to be rebuilt for a more modern service. The Blue Line reached Downtown Long Beach in September 1990, reestablishing rail service directly to Los Angeles. Trains operate in reserved medians set in city streets, with tracks in a loop configuration along Long Beach Boulevard, 1st Street, Pacific Avenue, and 8th Street. It was renamed to the A Line in 2020. Completion of the Regional Connector in 2023 realized the ambitions of transit planners for a one-seat ride between Long Beach and Pasadena via what is the world's longest light rail line.
