= Eduardo Moreno =

Eduardo Moreno may refer to the following:

- Eduardo Pareyón Moreno – Mexican architect and archaeologist
- Eduardo Moreno (swimmer) – Mexican swimmer
- Eduardo Moreno – A railroad engineer who was involved in the 2020 failed USNS Mercy attack.
