= Jose Holguin-Veras =

José Holguín-Veras
- Born: Santo Domingo, Dominican Republic
- Education: University of Texas at Austin
- Spouse: Teresa Holguin
- Awards: Fellow, American Society of Civil Engineers
- Scientific career
- Fields: Civil Engineering; Transportation Engineering; Economics
- Workplaces: Rensselaer Polytechnic Institute, City College of New York
- Academic advisors: C. Michael Walton

Jose Holguin-Veras is the William H. Hart Professor, Director of the Center for Infrastructure, Transportation, and the Environment, and Head of the Volvo Research and Educational Foundations (VREF) Center of Excellence on Sustainable Urban Freight Systems at the Rensselaer Polytechnic Institute. He is a graduate of the Universidad Autónoma de Santo Domingo, the Central University of Venezuela, and the University of Texas at Austin.

In 2013, Holguin-Veras received the White House Champion of Change Award for his contributions to freight transportation and disaster response. In 2014, he was elected a fellow of the American Society of Civil Engineers. Holguin-Veras was the leader of the team behind the "New York City Off-Hour Deliveries" project, which in 2017 became a finalist in the Institute for Operations Research and Management Sciences Franz Edelman Award Competition. Dr. Holguin-Veras has been named an Edelman Fellow in the Class of 2017. He is a specialist in urban freight systems.
