= Alameda Belt Line =

Railway line in California

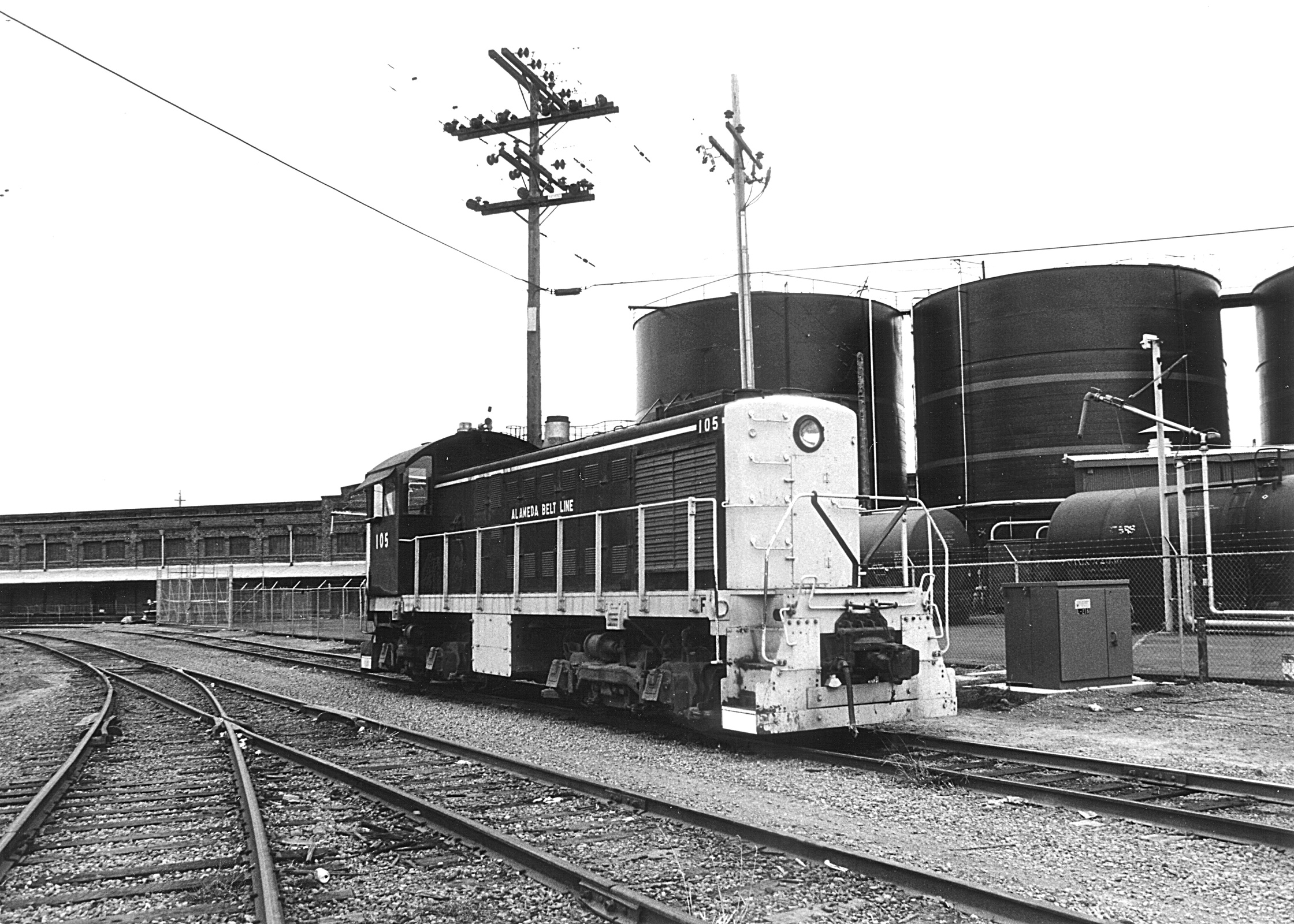
- Alameda Belt Line locomotive 105

Overview
- Headquarters: Alameda, California
- Reporting mark: ABL
- Locale: Alameda, California
- Dates of operation: 1926–1998

Technical
- Track gauge: 4 ft 8 1/2 in (1,435 mm) standard gauge

The Alameda Belt Line (reporting mark ABL) was incorporated on January 12, 1925, to take over about 1.2 miles (1.9 km) of trackage constructed by the city of Alameda, California, on Clement Avenue in 1918. The company acquired the 22-acre (8.9 ha) property on February 17, 1926, and was jointly owned by the Western Pacific Railroad and the Atchison, Topeka and Santa Fe Railway. Due to mergers, it was eventually jointly owned and operated by the BNSF Railway and Union Pacific Railroad.

For much of its later history, the ABL was operated in concert with the Oakland Terminal Railway. The ABL last operated in 1998, when its major shipper, a Del Monte cannery, closed. The Union Pacific then operated over the line through trackage rights to serve one remaining shipper until late 2001. The final locomotive on the line was leased to the Central California Traction Company in Stockton, California.

On January 28, 1999, the land was sold to a developer who planned to build approximately 200 homes on the former rail yard. The city of Alameda went to court to get the land returned to the city, in order to turn the property into a public park, and won, per a provision in the original 1920s contract which gave the city the right to repurchase the land at the original sale price of $30,000 (equivalent to $563,592 in 2025). The judge's ruling put the city's purchase price at $966,027, significantly less than the $18 million sale price to the developer.

As of 2008, only a few pieces of its trackage still remain in place. Most rails have been removed or paved over. The line was formally abandoned in 2012.

== Alameda Corridor ==
In 2024, the charter and name were reused for a jointly owned subsidiary of BNSF and Union Pacific that took over dispatching of the Alameda Corridor serving the ports of Los Angeles and Long Beach in Southern California. In 2026, it was announced that ABL would begin serving the 19 route miles (31 km) and 96 track miles (154 km) for the ports, taking over from Pacific Harbor Line.
