= L.T. Fisher =

Journalist

Lemuel T. Fisher, known as L.T. Fisher, (about 1831–1909) was a journalist who founded several newspapers in Southern California.

Fisher

== Career ==
Fisher received his early journalism training on the Louisville Press, in Louisville, Kentucky, and in 1868 he and F.L. McChesney bought the Western Citizen in Paris, the oldest newspaper in the state.

In 1874 he was the owner of the Wilmington Enterprise in Wilmington, California, having purchased it from W.H. Mason, and in 1882 he founded the Wilmington Outlook. In 1875 he gave up the Wilmington paper and moved its equipment to Santa Monica, where he began a new venture he named the Santa Monica Outlook. He wrote: ". . . if encouraging words had been dollars, we should be rich. But, unfortunately, good wishes will not support a newspaper. Not later than the 20th of October, and as much sooner as possible, we purpose issuing the first number under the novel but appropriate title of the 'Santa Monica Outlook.'"

The Evening Express of Los Angeles opined:

Wilmington suffers a serious loss in this newspaper translation. Mr. Fisher is a very vimmy editor, and has made the Enterprise one of the most readable papers in this section. We congratulate Santa Monica on the acquisition of so active and capable newspaper man. He will present the interests of the little city by the sea in a manner that will be entirely acceptable and will, we have no doubt, render his enterprise a financial success.

In 1879, he suspended the publication of the Santa Monica Outlook and moved to Downey, where he founded a newspaper, which he published for six months.

Of the move, the Los Angeles Evening Express wrote:

Since the abandonment of the wharf at Santa Monica, the business of the town has so degenerated as to leave only the most meagre support for a weekly newspaper, and, rather than starve to death, Fisher has concluded to leave. . . . A paper such as Fisher is capable of turning out is a rara avis among country publications. We have no hesitancy in saying that the [Santa Monica] Outlook has been the spiciest, newsiest, most readable weekly paper on our county exchange list. . . . We sympathize with Santa Monica in her loss and Downey on her gain.

In 1881–82, Fisher was working in the editorial department of the San Diego Union, and in the latter year he returned to Los Angeles, to a job on the Evening Express.

From 1883 to 1886 he was an editorial writer on the Express and then moved to Santa Monica, where he became a collector of the port as well as again working on the Outlook. He was a member of the Santa Monica Library Board in 1890.

In 1891 Fisher quit as editor and sold his interest in the Santa Monica Outlook to W.S. Rogers and Eugene Day. In the same year he was active in a committee seeking to build a new wharf in Santa Monica, the previous one having been sold. The Needles Eye of Needles, California, citing a report in the Citrograph, said on October 25, 1891, that Fisher had "repurchased the Santa Monica Outook, and we again see an outlook for the same lively paper from the seashore that we had in days of yore."

In 1900 Fisher returned to Los Angeles and became a member of the law publishing firm Spencer & Fisher. He retired some eighteen months later.

== Personal life ==
Fisher was born about 1831 in Louisville, Kentucky. He studied at Antioch College in Ohio. In 1885 he was living in South Pasadena. He and Edna J. Gardner (or Edna Hartman) were married on September 1, 1887, in Santa Monica, California.

Fisher died on May 12, 1909, in the Clara Barton Hospital, Los Angeles. He was buried in Rosedale Cemetery in that city. Probate of his will revealed that his property (except for his mining stock) was left to E. Agatha Hoskins. The mining shares were bequeathed to "my grandchildren (children of Mabel Hoskins Spies)."

Fisher was an active member of the Democratic Party.
