= Baltimore and Ohio SD20-2 =

Diesel-electric locomotive developed by B&O in 1979-1980

B&O SD20-2
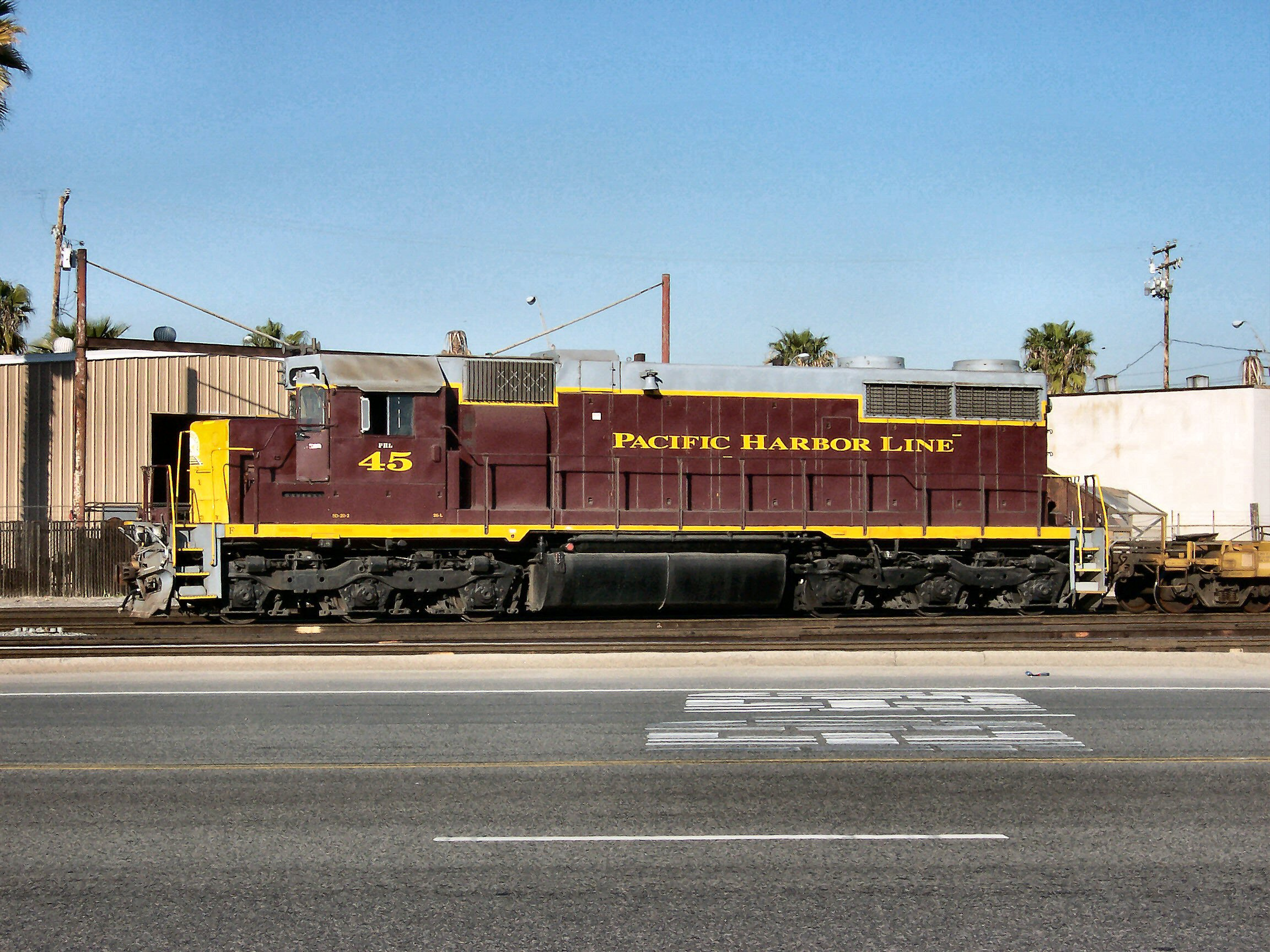
- Former B&O #2401, an SD20-2 rebuild, works the Pacific Harbor Line in Long Beach, California in February, 2005.
Type and origin
- Power type: Diesel-electric
- Builder: Original: GM-EMD; Rebuild: B&O
- Build date: Original: 1964; Rebuild: 1979/80
- Total produced: 5
Specifications
- Gauge: 4 ft 8 1/2 in (1,435 mm) standard gauge
Performance figures
- Power output: 2,000 hp (1,500 kW)

The SD20-2 was a type of diesel-electric locomotive created in 1979/1980 by the Baltimore and Ohio Railroad by rebuilding EMD SD35 locomotives. Five of the B&O's SD35 fleet were rebuilt at their Cumberland Yard by fitting a non-turbocharged EMD 645 engine and upgraded electrical systems. They were placed in service at the B&O Queensgate Yard in Cincinnati, Ohio attached to slugs, engineless units with traction motors that draw their power from the "mother" unit.

With the B&O, the SD20-2s were numbered #7700–7704. At some point, #7700 and #7702 swapped numbers. All of them passed to CSX Transportation as #2400-2404, but are now withdrawn from CSX service. One of the units, #2401, went on to the Ohio Central Railroad System; #2401 was in turn resold to the Pacific Harbor Line and reassigned road #45 (pictured at right). #2404 was scrapped by Cycle Systems of Roanoke, Virginia in August 2006.

== See also ==
- List of GM-EMD locomotives
