= Anacostia Rail Holdings Company =

Anacostia Rail Holdings Company is a transportation development and consulting firm responsible for the operations of several railroads:

- Chicago South Shore and South Bend Railroad
- Gulf Coast Switching
- Louisville and Indiana Railroad
- New York and Atlantic Railway
- Northern Lines Railway
- Pacific Harbor Line

Founded in 1985, it is based at the Railway Exchange Building in Chicago, Illinois, and has an office in New York City.

Anacostia Rail Holdings Company, formerly Anacostia & Pacific, has developed eight new U. S. railroads. In each case, the company negotiated the terms of acquisition, developed the business plan and recruited senior management. Anacostia & Pacific also provides management consulting services, analyses and expert testimony. Its clients have included governmental agencies, class I and short line railroads and financial institutions.
