= Paris, Kentucky =

- City
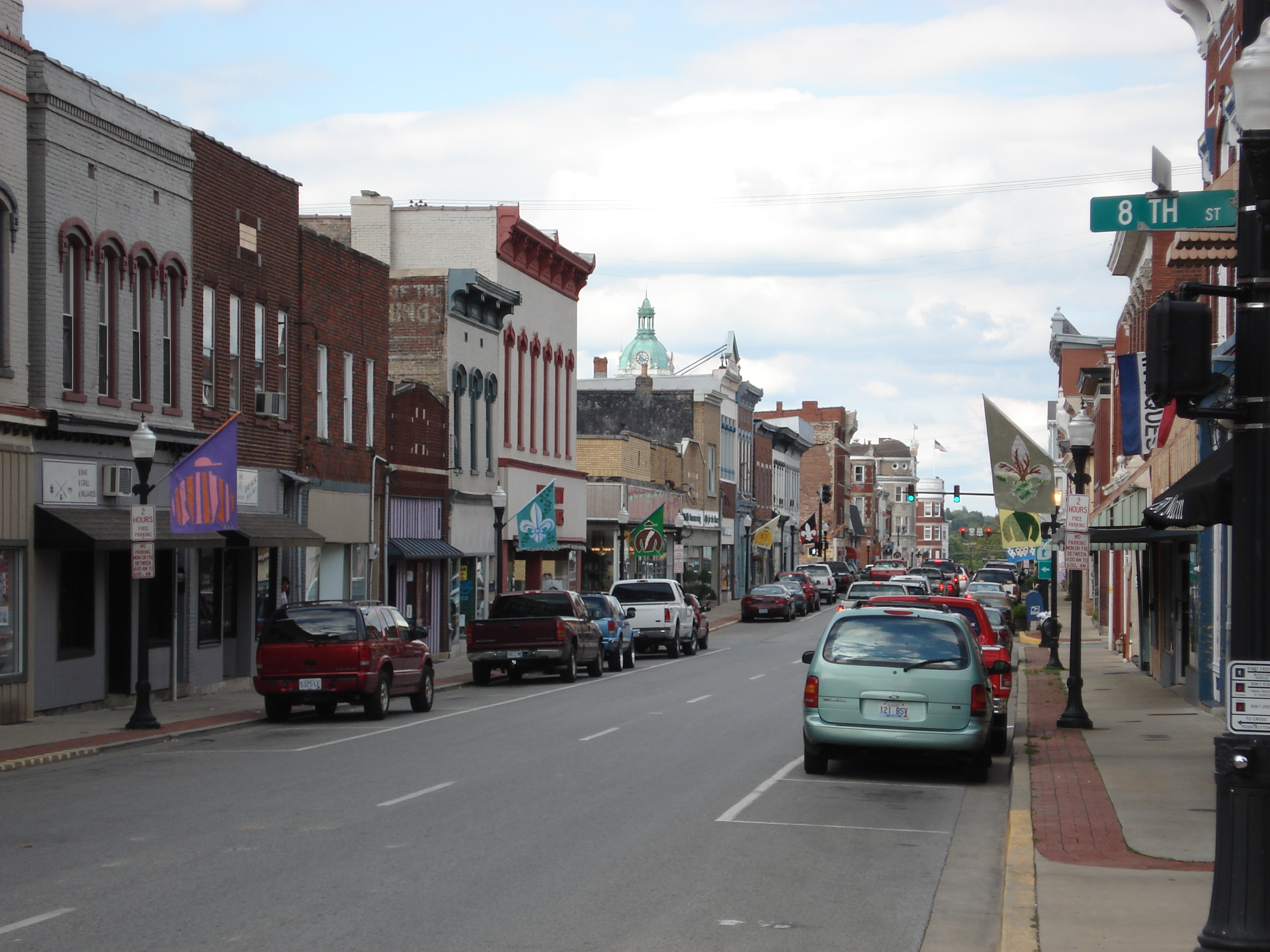
- Downtown Paris
- Motto: "Thoroughbred Capital of the World"
- Location of Paris in Bourbon County, Kentucky.
- Coordinates: 38°12′23″N 84°15′28″W
- Country: United States
- State: Kentucky
- County: Bourbon
- Established: 1789
- Incorporated: 1839
- Reincorporated: 1890
- Named for: Paris, France

Government
  - Mayor: Johnny Plummer

Area
  - Total: 8.00 sq mi (20.72 km^{2})
  - Land: 7.95 sq mi (20.58 km^{2})
  - Water: 0.050 sq mi (0.13 km^{2})
- Elevation: 843 ft (257 m)

Population (2020)
  - Total: 10,171
  - Estimate (2022): 10,075
  - Density: 1,279.9/sq mi (494.18/km^{2})
- Time zone: UTC-5 (Eastern (EST))
  - Summer (DST): UTC-4 (EDT)
- ZIP codes: 40361-40362
- Area code: 859
- FIPS code: 21-59196
- GNIS feature ID: 2404473
- Website: paris.ky.gov

Paris is a home rule–class city in Bourbon County, Kentucky, and the county seat. It lies 18 miles (29 km) northeast of Lexington on the Stoner Fork of the Licking River. It is part of the Lexington–Fayette Metropolitan Statistical Area. As of 2020, it had a population of 10,171.

== History ==
Joseph Houston settled a station in the area in 1776, but was forced to relocate due to prior land grants. In 1786, Lawrence Protzman purchased the area of present-day Paris from its owners, platted 250 acres (100 ha) for a town, and offered land for public buildings in exchange for the Virginia legislature making the settlement the seat of the newly formed Bourbon County. In 1789, the town was formally established as Hopewell after Hopewell, New Jersey, his hometown. The next year, it was renamed Paris after the French capital to match its county and honor the French assistance during the American Revolution.

Among the early settlers in the late 18th and early 19th centuries were French refugees who had fled the excesses of their own revolution. One Frenchman was noted in a 19th-century state history as having come from Calcutta, via Bengal, before settling as a schoolteacher in Paris, Kentucky.

The post office was briefly known as Bourbontown or Bourbonton in the early 19th century, but there is no evidence that this name was ever formally applied to the town itself. It was incorporated as Paris in 1839 and again in 1890.

African American students attended Paris Colored High School. Paris is the "sister city" of Lamotte-Beuvron in France.

== Geography ==
According to the United States Census Bureau, the city has a total area of 6.0 square miles (15.5 km^{2}), of which 5.9 square miles (15.4 km^{2}) is land and 0.04 square miles (0.1 km^{2}), or 0.52%, is water.

== Demographics ==
Historical population
Census	Pop.	Note	%±
1800	377		—
1810	838		122.3%
1830	1,219		—
1840	1,197		−1.8%
1850	1,384		15.6%
1860	1,440		4.0%
1870	2,655		84.4%
1880	3,204		20.7%
1890	4,218		31.6%
1900	4,603		9.1%
1910	5,859		27.3%
1920	6,310		7.7%
1930	6,204		−1.7%
1940	6,697		7.9%
1950	6,912		3.2%
1960	7,791		12.7%
1970	7,823		0.4%
1980	7,935		1.4%
1990	8,730		10.0%
2000	9,183		5.2%
2010	8,553		−6.9%
2020	10,171		18.9%
2024 (est.)	10,185		0.1%
U.S. Decennial Census

=== 2020 census ===
As of the 2020 census, Paris had a population of 10,171. The median age was 38.5 years. 25.0% of residents were under the age of 18 and 16.5% were 65 years of age or older. For every 100 females, there were 90.0 males, and for every 100 females age 18 and over, there were 83.0 males age 18 and over.

97.5% of residents lived in urban areas, while 2.5% lived in rural areas.

There were 4,188 households, of which 33.1% had children under the age of 18 living in them. Of all households, 36.1% were married-couple households, 17.7% were households with a male householder and no spouse or partner present, and 37.0% were households with a female householder and no spouse or partner present. About 32.0% of all households were made up of individuals, and 13.6% had someone living alone who was 65 years of age or older.

There were 4,588 housing units, of which 8.7% were vacant. The homeowner vacancy rate was 1.5%, and the rental vacancy rate was 6.3%.

Racial composition as of the 2020 census
Race	Number	Percent
White	7,985	78.5%
Black or African American	922	9.1%
American Indian and Alaska Native	34	0.3%
Asian	41	0.4%
Native Hawaiian and Other Pacific Islander	5	0.0%
Some other race	504	5.0%
Two or more races	680	6.7%
Hispanic or Latino (of any race)	803	7.9%

=== 2000 census ===
As of the 2000 census, there were 9,183 people, 3,857 households, and 2,487 families residing in the city. The population density was 1,351.2 people per square mile (521.7 people/km^{2}). There were 4,222 housing units at an average density of 621.2 units per square mile (239.8 units/km^{2}). The racial makeup of the city was 84.23% White, 12.71% African American, 0.16% Native American, 0.16% Asian, 1.35% from other races, and 1.38% from two or more races. Hispanic or Latino of any race were 2.62% of the population.

There were 3,857 households, out of which 31.9% had children under the age of 18 living with them, 43.8% were married couples living together, 16.5% had a female householder with no husband present, and 35.5% were non-families. 31.2% of all households were made up of individuals, and 14.2% had someone living alone who was 65 years of age or older. The average household size was 2.33 and the average family size was 2.90.

In the city, the population was spread out, with 25.3% under the age of 18, 9.0% from 18 to 24, 28.5% from 25 to 44, 21.6% from 45 to 64, and 15.7% who were 65 years of age or older. The median age was 36 years. For every 100 females, there were 88.9 males. For every 100 females age 18 and over, there were 82.7 males.

The median income for a household in the city was $30,872, and the median income for a family was $37,358. Males had a median income of $29,275 versus $21,285 for females. The per capita income for the city was $16,645. About 17.5% of families and 17.8% of the population were below the poverty line, including 24.2% of those under age 18 and 15.9% of those age 65 or over.

== Arts and culture ==
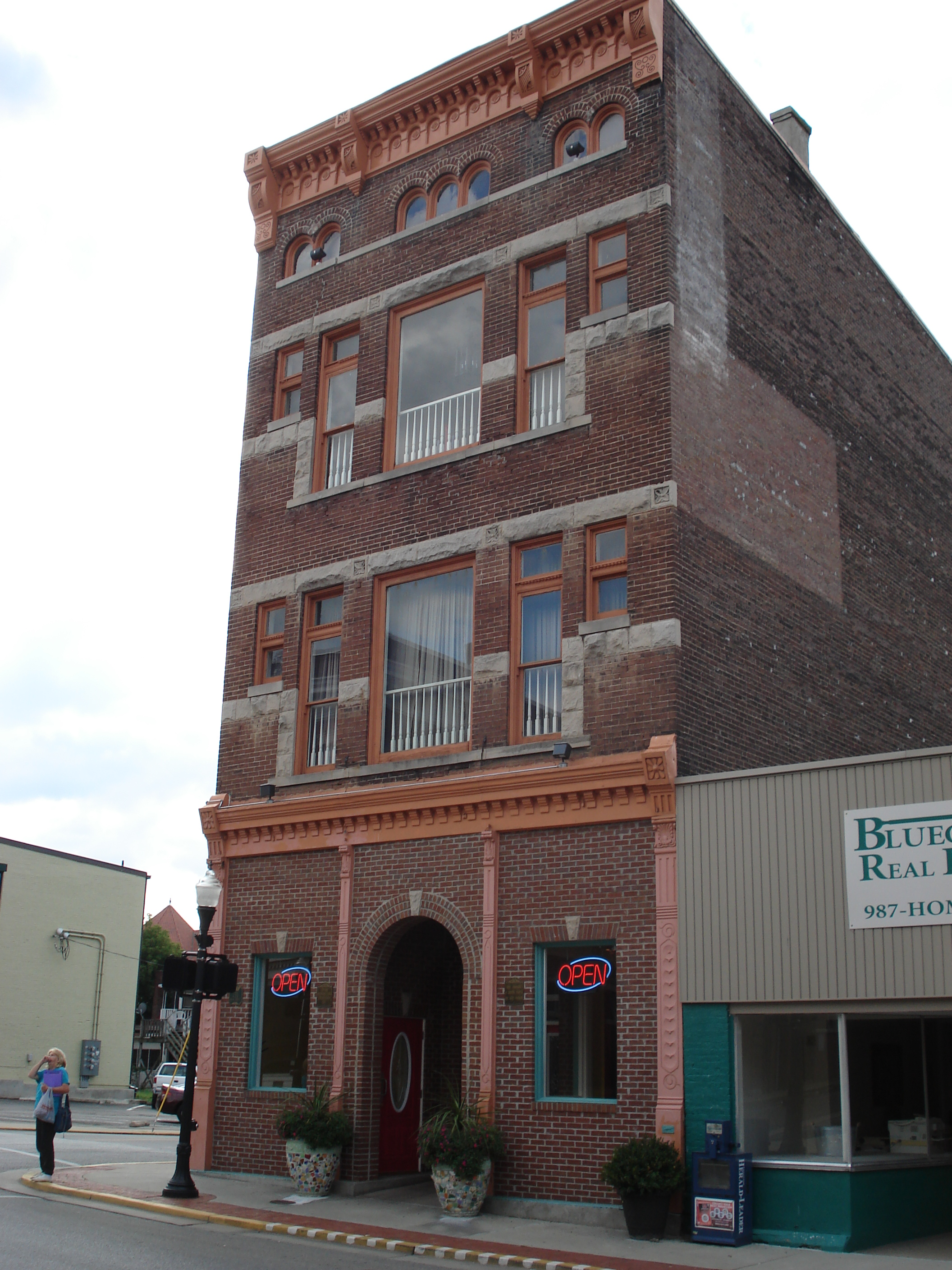
The world's tallest three story structure

Between 2006 and 2008, fifteen buildings were renovated in the downtown.

Artistic and cultural sites and events include:

- Downtown Paris ARTWALK, an artistic event.
- Nannine Clay Wallis Arboretum, a 4-acre (16,000 m^{2}) arboretum where many trees were planted in the 1850s when the house was built.
- The Hopewell Museum, a Beaux Arts structure built in 1909 which served as the area's first post office.
- Duncan Tavern, a stone structure built in 1788, which houses a genealogical collection.
- The Vardens Building, a Victorian architecture building which contained a surgeon and dental office, and a ballroom, and is now a retail space.
- The Shinner Building, built in 1891, listed by Ripley's Believe It or Not! as the world's tallest three-story structure.

Paris has a public library, the Paris-Bourbon County Library.

== Education ==
Local schools in includes, Paris High School (in the Paris Independent Schools district), and Bourbon County High School (in the Bourbon County Schools district).

== Notable people ==
- William Patterson Alexander (1805–1884), missionary in Hawaii
- Bill Arnsparger (1926–2015), football coach, head coach of New York Giants
- Virgil Chapman (1895–1951), U.S. representative from Kentucky
- Pauline Redmond Coggs (1912–2005), social worker, civil rights activist
- Blanton Collier (1906–1983), NFL coach of 1964 champion Cleveland Browns
- Joseph Duncan (1794–1844), sixth Governor of Illinois
- John Price Durbin (1800–1876), Chaplain of the Senate, President of Dickinson College
- William Lee D. Ewing (1795–1846), fifth Governor of Illinois
- Lemuel T. Fisher, newspaper publisher
- John Fox, Jr. (1862–1919), author of The Little Shepherd of Kingdom Come and The Trail of the Lonesome Pine
- Silvana Gallardo, actress and acting coach, was living in Paris at the time of her death
- James G. Jones (1814–1872), first mayor of Evansville, Indiana, Indiana Attorney General
- Mary Rootes Thornton McAboy (1815–1892), poet
- Garrett Morgan (1877–1963), invented tri-state traffic signal and emergency breathing device
- Bernie Haynes Robynson (1900–2001), printmaker, illustrator born in Paris, Kentucky; and part of the Harlem Renaissance movement
- George Snyder, silversmith, clockmaker, and inventor of modern bait-casting fishing reel
- Robert Trimble, Associate Justice of the Supreme Court of the United States
- Jim Tucker (1932–2020), basketball player, attended Paris Western High School
- Francis Marion Wood (1878–1943), educator and school administrator, worked in Paris
- John R. Baylor (1822–1894), Indian agent, publisher and editor, politician, senior officer of the CSA, and 1st Governor of Arizona Territory
