= 2020 failed USNS Mercy attack =

Failed terrorist attack involving a navy ship and a train

Details
- Date: March 31, 2020
- Location: San Pedro, Los Angeles, California
- Country: United States
- Operator: Pacific Harbor Line (PHL)
- Incident type: Failed hospital ship terrorist attack by a train
- Cause: Engineer intentionally crashing a train into the USNS Mercy

Statistics
- Trains: 1
- Crew: 1
- Deaths: 0
- Injured: 0

On March 31, 2020, the USNS Mercy, an American hospital ship, was involved in a failed terrorist attack. The incident involved an engineer attempting to intentionally slam a train into the vessel, due to a supposed conspiracy. The event took place during the COVID-19 pandemic.

== Background ==
=== Train and suspect ===
On March 31, 2020, a Pacific Harbor Line (PHL) engineer named Eduardo Moreno, who was a 44-year old California resident in the area of Los Angeles, had operated a locomotive that was pulling one intermodal freight car, the locomotive involved was MP20B-3 #21, formerly Boston and Maine GP38 #254, the train was being operated at the PHL's San Pedro yard in San Pedro, Los Angeles, California.

=== Train derailment ===
Moreno saw the hospital ship, USNS Mercy, as a conspiracy and believed it was connected to a government plot, while it was docked at San Pedro, claiming that he didn't believe that "the ship is what they say it's for."

After building up this "conspiracy theory" in his head, Moreno sets the MP20B-3's throttle into notch 8, causing the locomotive to speed down the 200-metre (656-foot-2-inch) dead-end siding, crash through a concrete barrier, then through a steel barrier, then through a chain-link fence, having the train slide through a parking lot, and then slide through a gravel lot, both lots had unoccupied cars, then break another chain-link fence, until the train came to a stop without striking USNS Mercy.

No one was injured or killed, but the locomotive's fuel tank had spilled around 2,000 US gallons (7,600 litres; 1,700 imperial gallons) of diesel fuel.

=== Arrest and interviews ===
A California Highway Patrol (CHP) officer witnessed the train derailment, and Eduardo Moreno was immediately arrested at the scene by the CHP officer and port police, following his arrest, Moreno told an officer that he believed USNS Mercy was "suspicious" and connected to a government plot. Moreno also stated to agents of the Federal Bureau of Investigation (FBI), that he acted out of a desire to "awaken people" and expressed suspicions about the ship's true purpose.

"You only get this chance once. The whole world is watching. I had to. People don’t know what’s going on here. Now they will. At night, they turn off the lights and don’t let anyone in. I’m going to expose this to the world. When was the last time you went to Dodgers' stadium? We might not be able to go again."

— Eduardo Moreno, the full quote he stated when he was interviewed by CHP officer once he wrecked the train.

The director of media relations for the Port of Los Angeles, Phillip Sanfield, had told the news company, American Shipper, that Moreno never had a chance of reaching USNS Mercy with a train.

=== Charges and penalties ===
Moreno later admitted that he acted alone and planned the derailment, hoping to generate media attention for his suspicions. Moreno was charged for train wrecking and terrorism, where he would initially be sentenced to 20 years in prison. He plead guilty for the charge in December 2021, and on April 13, 2022, he was sentenced 36 months or three years in a federal prison, and was ordered to pay a $755,880 fine ($831,606 in 2026) in damages, he was 46 years old at the time the charges and sentencing were made by United States District Judge (USDJ) Philip S. Gutierrez. The case was filed by the U.S. Attorney's Office for the Central District of California.

== Aftermath ==
Moreno lost his job at Pacific Harbor Line. He was released from prison on April 13, 2025. He was barred permanently from working as a locomotive engineer in the United States as a result of the felony.

USNS Mercy continued its mission of taking on non-COVID-19 patients, unaffected by the incident, while the local hospitals would deal with COVID-19 patients. MP20B-3 #21 was repaired and returned to service on PHL and is still in service as of 2026.
