= Get Out and Push Railroad =

Railway in California, United States

Wilmington & Long Beach Rapid Transit Railroad (a.k.a. Get Out and Push Railroad)
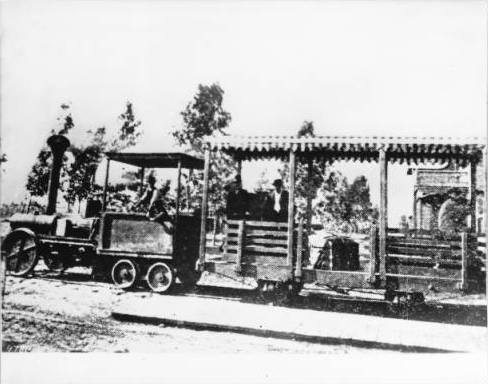
- The Get Out and Push Railroad in 1887, "with seats all around and a place in the center for baggage"

Overview
- Locale: California
- Dates of operation: 1882–1887
- Successor: Southern Pacific Railroad

The Get Out and Push Railroad (formally, the Wilmington & Long Beach Rapid Transit Railroad) was a 19th-century street railway, connecting Wilmington, California, to the Willmore area of Long Beach, California, which requested its patrons to assist trains over the steeper parts of the route.

== Origins ==
The line was built by Robert M. Widney to convey potential buyers to a new tract of land which he and W. E. Willmore were developing, at first called Willmore City but later renamed Long Beach. Originally a horse-drawn car, on the first day of service (October 31, 1882) the vehicle broke its wooden rails, forcing the men passengers to push it to a sound section of track, after which the line was popularly known as the G.O.P. ("Get Out and Push") Railroad. In 1883 floods washed the line out twice.

Few lots were sold, and in 1884 the land scheme was abandoned. Instead, an extensive advertising campaign was undertaken promoting Long Beach as a summertime resort, and the line was extended to the newly built five-story Bay View Hotel, located just south of what is now Lincoln Park.

== Conversion to steam ==
In 1885 a route was surveyed for a steam railway which would replace (and roughly follow the route of) the horsecar line. On initial test runs, however, the small steam engine was unable to move the car coupled to it until (as reported by the Los Angeles Herald) "a man boosted them with a pinch bar. When the railroad is completed, some of the citizens suggest that the horse rail-way be continued in operation for the benefit of those who may be in a hurry."

The steam line was completed in 1886 and eventually renamed the Wilmington & Long Beach Rapid Transit Railroad. But it inherited its predecessor's "Get Out and Push" nickname because (in the words of Walter H. Case)

the little engine was a very primitive affair. It was so constructed that it had to be started with a metal bar, and was covered with a wooden jacket which used to catch fire when the boiler was hot enough to make a good steam. Then, since the water in the boiler had to be used to extinguish the fire, the steam would go down and the engine refuse to run ... It ran fairly well on level ground, but on a rise it was apt to stop entirely till the male passengers got out and applied the iron bar with considerable force.

The Los Angeles Times published a song to the tune of "Paddy Duffey's Cart":

Oh, sing a song of railroad, / Likewise the iron hoss,
Of all that run beneath the sun, / The Long Beach is the boss;
With a thirteen-cat-power engine, / That starts with a big pinch-bar,
Oh, everyone gets out and pushes / On the G. O. P. R. R.

Two streaks of rust, a ballast of dust, / Amid a two-foot right of way,
We blister space at an awful pace, / Two miles and a half a day;
With rails of cold rolled hairpins, / And a shoebox for a car,
Oh, everybody get out and push, / On the G. O. P. R. R.

In 1887 the line was taken over by the Southern Pacific Railroad.

== See also ==
- Streetcars in Long Beach
