= Urban freight distribution =

System and process

Urban freight distribution is the system and process by which goods are collected, transported, and distributed within urban environments. The urban freight system can include seaports, airports, manufacturing facilities, and warehouse/distribution centers that are connected by a network of railroads, rail yards, pipelines, highways, and roadways that enable goods to get to their destinations.

Urban freight distribution is essential to supporting international and domestic trade as well as the daily needs of local businesses and consumers. In addition, it provides thousands of jobs and other economic benefits. However, a number of challenges are associated with urban freight, such as road congestion, environmental impacts, and land use conflicts due to the proximity of freight facilities and vehicles to residential and sensitive land uses. As urban freight continues to grow, the social and environmental impacts associated with these challenges will need to be addressed and mitigated.

== Description and evolution ==
One of the main drivers of urban freight transport has been the continued urbanization of the world's population. According to the United Nations (UN), 3.9 billion people (54%) of the world's population lives in urban areas, up from 746 million in 1950. Projections indicate that urbanization combined with the overall growth of the world's population could add another 2.5 billion people to urban populations by 2050, or 66% of the total world population. The UN notes that the number of mega-cities of ten million or more inhabitants has increased from ten in 1990 to 28 in 2014. By 2030, the world is expected to have 41 mega-cities.

As the total number and concentration of the world's population in urban areas has grown, so has the importance of transporting and delivering the consumer goods required to sustain these urban areas. This includes freight transportation to and from warehouse/distribution centers, retail stores, businesses, and homes.

Urban freight distribution also involves transportation from freight-generating facilities such as seaports, airports, railyards, manufacturing facilities, and warehouse/distribution centers, many of which are located in urban areas and utilize an urban region's roadway and railway network to transport goods. In addition, many companies today use sophisticated computerized logistics systems to manage their supply chains and employ just-in-time (JIT) manufacturing and delivery to minimize inventory and expenses. While JIT can significantly reduce production costs, it also requires efficient and reliable transportation systems, both within and between urban regions, to be effective.

At the local or neighborhood level, the growth of E-commerce and small package delivery by firms such as FedEx and UPS means that cities and communities should consider the needs of truck circulation and parking/loading zones within residential and commercial areas to facilitate delivery of goods.

Complicating urban freight is the need of the transportation system to also accommodate other roadway users such as automobiles, public transit, bicycles, and pedestrians. For example, cities are increasingly implementing road diets to enhance and encourage walking, bicycling, livability, and pedestrian safety. According to the Federal Highway Administration (FHWA), it is possible for road diets to accommodate freight movement if factors such as current land use, truck size, delivery parking areas, and intersection design are considered in the planning process.

== Components ==
Urban freight distribution can include the following components, depending on the location of the urban area:

=== Seaports ===
Seaports allow ships to dock and transfer people or cargo to or from land. Seaports handle a variety of goods including cargo shipped by intermodal containers, bulk commodities such as crude oil, and specialized cargo such as automobiles. Major container ports in North America include the Port of Los Angeles, Port of Long Beach, Port of New York and New Jersey, Port of Savannah, Port of Vancouver, Port of Oakland, Port of Virginia, Port of Houston, Port of Tacoma, Port of Charleston, and Port of Seattle.

=== Airports ===
Airports, and more specifically air cargo, are a significant component of the freight system. It is estimated that in the United States in 2013, over $1.1 billion worth of goods traveled by air. The top five airports in the U.S., ranked by landed weight of all-cargo operations in 2014, are Memphis International Airport, Ted Stevens Anchorage International Airport, Louisville International Airport, Chicago O'Hare International Airport, and Miami International Airport.

=== Warehouses and distribution centers ===
A distribution center is a warehouse or other specialized building that receives, stores, and distributes goods to a variety of destinations such as retail stores, businesses, consumers, manufacturing facilities, or other distribution centers.

=== Railways and railyards ===
Railroads haul a variety of goods such as intermodal containers, bulk goods, and other specialized cargo such as automobiles. In the United States, railroads are most commonly used to transport cargo over distances of 1,000 to 2,000 miles. Railroads are complemented by rail yards that allow freight from shippers to be trucked in, transferred onto railcars, and for trains to be assembled. There are three railroad classes in the United States: Class I, II, and III. According to the Association of American Railroads, Class I railroads had a minimum carrier operating revenue of $433.2 million in 2011. There are six Class I railroads in the United States: BNSF Railway, Canadian National Railway, Canadian Pacific Kansas City, CSX Transportation, Norfolk Southern Railway, and Union Pacific Railroad.

=== Roads ===
In the United States, trucks transport the vast majority of goods in terms of both weight and value. In fact, trucks transport 85% of goods traveling 249 miles or less. To transport their goods, trucks utilize the roadway network consisting of freeways, highways, and arterials.

The roads that trucks can travel on are regulated at the national, state, and local levels. In the United States the Surface Transportation Assistance Act of 1982 established a National Network of highways that permits "conventional combination" trucks (tractors with one semitrailer up to 48 feet in length or with one 28-foot semitrailer and one 28-foot trailer, and can be up to 102 inches wide) to travel on. The National Network consists of the Interstate Highway System as well as non-interstate highways designated by states. The FHWA also designates intermodal connectors and the National Highway Freight Network, which consists of the Primary Highway Freight System (PHFS), portions of the interstate system not part of the PHFS, Critical Rural Freight Corridors (CRFC), and Critical Urban Freight Corridors (CUFC).

At the local level, many cities designate truck routes within their respective jurisdictions. In most jurisdictions, trucks are allowed to use most streets as needed for local deliveries. However, local jurisdictions can restrict "through" truck trips that pass through a jurisdiction but do not end or begin there. For these "through" truck trips, trucks can be required to travel on designated truck routes and remain on the designated truck route for as long of the trip as possible.

Designated truck routes enable cities to channelize trucks onto roadways that have sufficient lane and intersection width, and in some cases pavement strength, to accommodate trucks. In addition, designated truck routes can be used to direct trucks onto arterials in industrial and commercial areas and away from residential areas, schools, parks, and other sensitive land uses.

Many local jurisdictions also designate curbside truck parking and loading zones. The purpose of truck parking and loading zones is to provide adequate space for trucks to load and unload their goods, and prevent illegal and double parking by trucks. Cities provide guidelines for locating parking and loading zones and often allow businesses to apply to establish a new parking and loading zone. Cities can also regulate the type of truck and length of time that trucks can park in a parking or loading zone and establish fines for violations.

== Benefits ==
The efficient and timely distribution of freight is critical for supporting the demands of modern urban areas. Without freight distribution, urban areas could not survive, grow, and flourish.

Freight distribution also generates significant economic benefits. For example, the Bureau of Transportation Statistics (BTS) estimates that in 2012, the freight industry (defined as rail, water, truck, and pipeline transportation, support activities for transportation, couriers and messengers, and warehousing and storage) employed over 4.3 million people and paid total wages of almost $184 billion, for an average wage of over $42,000US annually. Furthermore, for-hire transportation services contributed $481 billion to U.S. gross domestic product in 2013.

== Challenges ==
There are a number of challenges resulting from urban freight distribution, including traffic congestion, environmental impacts, and land use conflicts.

- The use of older trucks that emit a higher amount of emissions and have fewer safety features relative to newer trucks.
- The prevalent use of diesel fuel in the goods movement industry generates NOx and PM2.5 emissions that can have significant air quality impacts.
- Insufficient or inadequate truck parking and/or loading zones can result in illegal truck double parking, parking in bicycle lanes, or parking in center median lanes.
- Conflicts between trucks and automobiles, pedestrians, and bicyclists can occur in dense urban areas due to high vehicle volume, inadequate arterial capacity, inadequate intersection turning radii for trucks, and/or the increasing implementation of "Complete Street" elements such as bicycle lanes. These conflicts can result in congestion, parking, and safety impacts.
- The use of modern, longer trucks, particularly in highly dense urban areas or older industrial areas with inadequate intersection width can result in turning movement conflicts between trucks and other roadway users that can increase congestion, have safety impacts, and damage curbs, sidewalks, traffic signals, and signs.
- Within urban areas, the length and frequency of freight trains have resulted in growing congestion, noise, air quality, and safety impacts at at-grade crossings where trains and roads intersect. As a result, local jurisdictions have taken the initiative to construct road/rail grade separations to eliminate these conflicts. Notable examples include the Alameda Corridor and Alameda Corridor East programs in southern California, and the Chicago Region Environmental and Transportation Efficiency Program (CREATE).
- Land use conflicts can arise when goods movement facilities are located in close proximity to non-industrial land uses such as schools, residences, and parks. These conflicts can result in noise, air quality, and congestion impacts that may require significant mitigation measures. For example, the proposed Southern California International Gateway railyard that would be operated by the BNSF Railway just north of the Port of Los Angeles and Port of Long Beach would provide mobility and environmental benefits by enabling more intermodal containers to travel via rail instead of truck. However, the project has also generated protests and a lawsuit due to the proximity of the proposed facility to residential neighborhoods in West Long Beach, California.

These issues affect not only the efficiency of freight distribution but also the quality of life of citizens and public health.

== Policy and planning ==
In the United States, urban freight policy and planning is conducted at the federal, state, regional, and local levels. At the federal level, freight planning and policy is guided by the Fixing America's Surface Transportation Act (FAST) that establishes the National Multimodal Freight Policy and National Freight Strategic Plan. In addition, the FHWA Office of Freight Management and Operations conducts freight research, develops analytical tools and data, and organizes freight professional development programs.

At the state level, state Departments of Transportation (DOTs) are primarily responsible for planning, designing, constructing, and maintaining the highway system within the state. As part of the FAST Act, states were given additional roles and responsibilities for freight planning. States are now required to establish a State freight advisory committee as well as develop a comprehensive State freight plan.

Freight planning at the regional level is conducted by Metropolitan Planning Organizations (MPOs). MPOs are required in urbanized areas with a population greater than 50,000 and are mandated by the federal government to develop plans for transportation, growth management, hazardous waste management and air quality. An MPO must have a "continuing, cooperative and comprehensive" (3C) transportation planning process that results in plans and programs consistent with the comprehensively planned development of its corresponding urbanized area. The two primary roles of an MPO are to prepare the Regional Transportation Plan (RTP) and Transportation Improvement Program (TIP). The RTP presents a 20-year transportation vision for the region and provides a long-term investment framework for addressing the region's transportation and related challenges. The RTP addresses all modes of transportation including highway and transit projects, as well as high-speed regional transport. Projects must be included in the RTP to be eligible for state and federal funding. The TIP is a listing of proposed transportation projects to be funded through a variety of federal, state and local sources over the next six years in the respective region. In addition, some MPOs convene freight advisory committees that bring together public and private sector representatives to plan for freight in the region. One example is the Delaware Valley Regional Planning Commission Goods Movement Task Force.

Counties and local cities are primarily responsible for design, construction, and maintenance of the local roadway network within a county or city. This includes capacity enhancements, pavement maintenance, sidewalks, street lighting, signals, and signage. From a freight perspective, cities also designate local truck routes, Surface Transportation Assistance Act (STAA) terminal access routes, and parking and loading zones. In some cases, counties also collect and allocate locally generated tax revenue for transportation projects.

== Strategies ==
A variety of strategies exist and have been proposed or implemented by governments and private industry that help address the challenges of urban freight distribution. The range of strategies includes infrastructure, operational, technological, and policy:

=== Infrastructure ===
- Construction of dedicated truck lanes or truck climbing lanes to reduce congestion and improve safety
- Physical infrastructure improvements such as lane or intersection widening to reduce conflicts between trucks and other users of the roadway
- Construction of road/rail grade separations to remove conflicts between freight trains and vehicular traffic
- Increased investment in highway, rail, and transit infrastructure maintenance that will result in significant congestion, safety, and economic benefits. Currently, the Federal Highway Administration estimates that $170 billion in capital investment would be needed on an annual basis to significantly improve conditions and performance.

=== Operational ===
- Designating truck routes and truck parking/loading zones to better facilitate goods movementand reduce conflicts
- Inland distribution centers to reduce congestion in dense urban areas
- Extended business operating hours to allow night-time delivery of goods

=== Technological ===
- The use of information and communication technologies such as Radio Frequency Identification (RFID), Intelligent Transportation Systems (ITS), vehicle routing software or load sharing systems, etc. to maximize the efficiency of truck travel and minimize truck-miles of travel (TMT). ITS will introduce many opportunities for best management and control of urban freight distribution, with an informative system that will inform the driver about the real-time traffic conditions to help the driver to schedule its trips.
- Computerized marine terminal and/or warehouse appointment systems to better manage the flow of trucks.
- Use of lower sulfur diesel fuel, newer diesel engines, and alternative fuel trucks (natural gas, hybrid, electric) to reduce environmental impacts. For example, the Clean Air Action Plan being implemented by the Ports of Los Angeles and Long Beach includes a Clean Truck Program to introduce newer and/or alternative fuel trucks for drayage.

=== Policy ===
- Restricting truck delivery to off-peak hours to minimize congestion and maximize use of existing infrastructure
- Financial assistance, fees, and taxes (e.g., cordon pricing, congestion charges, area licensing, etc., as in London, Stockholm and Milan)
- Truck weight or size restrictions, as appropriate

=== Land use/facility design ===
- Better land use planning to locate freight facilities away from residential neighborhoods or in a manner that minimizes conflicts with adjacent land uses
- Improved freight facility design so as to reduce the impacts of those facilities to the surrounding community. This could include sufficient onsite truck parking and loading docks, landscaping, building materials, lighting design to reduce light impacts, buffer zones, and noise control policies and/or procedures.
- Provision of truck parking and/or loading zones to facilitate local delivery of goods

== Refrigerated freight ==
Consumers enjoy a best quality of life due to economic and societal changes, which imply several modifications in consumption. In fact, they can afford to consume more perishable products for example. Apart from that, the government has developed policies of "security of quality" and the regulation, obligating to add new products that need to be transported in refrigerated vehicles to the existing list. It is also obligatory to control the temperature of those vehicles during the delivery. Societal and legal requirements have obliged suppliers and transport companies to resort more frequently to the refrigerated urban freight distribution.

The use of refrigerated transportation improved the quality of the service provided but it also implies high negative impacts for the urban environment and citizens' quality of life. The traditional system of refrigeration consumes more combustible, so it increases the CO_{2} emissions. Noise due to the refrigeration system and the type of combustible used can also be a problem in urban zones.

=== Technology used ===
Most of the food that needs to be refrigerated is transported by road through the use of vehicles equipped with an isolated structure.

Many factors are evaluated during the design of the units for refrigerated food transportation, for example:

- The weather conditions
- The indoor climatic conditions
- The properties of the insulation system that will be used
- The possible infiltration of air and moisture, etc.

The refrigeration system used to transport food is based on vapor compression that ensures the maintenance of certain conditions such as temperature in function of the quantity and type of food transported. The units that use this technique can work at full thus allowing controlled transport of refrigerated loads.

=== Energy consumption and environmental impact ===
The energetic efficiency of the refrigerated boxes of the modes of transport has more importance depending on the region of the world. The rise in combustible prices and the environment evolution are other aspects that companies need to take into account.

The combustible consumption depends on the refrigerated system which has to be in relation with the kind of goods transported (refrigerated products as fruit and vegetables can travel at a 0 °C temperature and frozen products need a temperature lower than 20 °C).

The contamination is due to a combination of factors such as the pattern use of the refrigeration system, the type of product transported, the exposition to the sun, the density of the refrigerant, the setting of the control system such as modulation and the activation/deactivation of the compressor.

In some cases, energy consumption for the distribution of fresh food can be higher than for the transportation of frozen food, because of stricter controls in terms of product and because it breath more air to keep the uniform temperature during the distribution.

=== Transport through a passive-cooling system ===
According to a study (A. Ghirardi, 2003), the exportation and the distribution of fruit and vegetables are affected by the high cost of the environmental impact. The systems and technologies currently used are expensive, not compatible with the environment and not sustainable.

The transit time is a central aspect in export operations, and it has to take into account multiple factors, even imponderable as the quality of the product at destination. The passive refrigeration system allow to solve the problem of quality preserving, making the time of surrender compatible with the combined transport and independent of the energy source during the running, allowing also the use modes of transport without electrical connection.

An examination of the critical factors of refrigerated transport and characteristics of the passive refrigeration system emerges a synergy capable of solving the key aspects, and in particular:

- Coefficient of deterioration of the products obtained from the combination of factors such temperature, relative humidity and ventilation. These parameters are maintained in optimal conditions in the vehicle equipped with a passive refrigeration system that guarantee a longer life for the product that it transport compared to the traditional refrigeration mechanisms.
- Competitive costs for the transport

For distribution in urban areas, the saturation of the traffic and the propensity of cities to limit the flow of vehicles for goods distribution require the optimization of the logistics and distribution chain. This optimization is realizable by employing passive-cooling container units that are independent of loading and transport and allow the use of the same mode, also non-refrigerated, for the distribution using only one mode to deliver its order to the stores, keeping the products at an optimum temperatures and consistent with autonomy.

== See also ==
- Modes of transport
- Green procurement
- Emission standard
- European emission standard
- Transportation planning
- Urban planning

=== Projects related to urban freight distribution ===
- Best Urban Freight Solution (BESTUFS)
- Emission Free Refrigerated Urban Distribution (EFRUD)
- Co-ordinating Urban Pricing Integrated Demonstrations (CUPID)
- Thematic Network on Freight Transfer Points and Terminals (EUTP II)
- MObility management STrategies for the next decades (MOST)
- PRicing REgimes fOr inteGrated SuStainable mobility (PROGRESS)
- Open framework for Simulation of transport Strategies and Assessment (OSSA)
- Remote mEasurement of Vehicle Emissions At Low cost (REVEAL)
- Effects on Transport of Trends in Logistics and Supply Chain Management (SULOGTRA)
