= Wilmington, Los Angeles =

- Neighborhood of Los Angeles
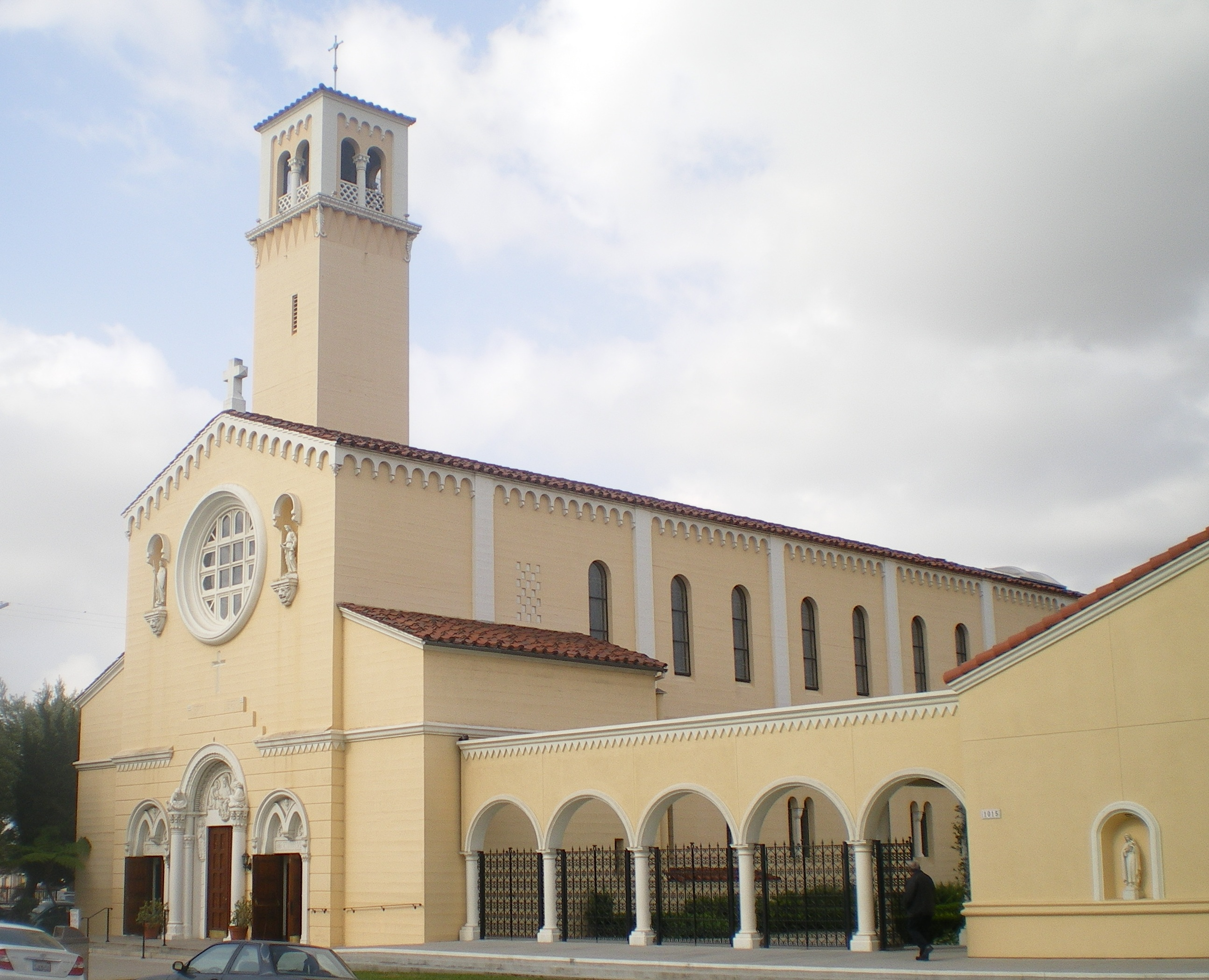
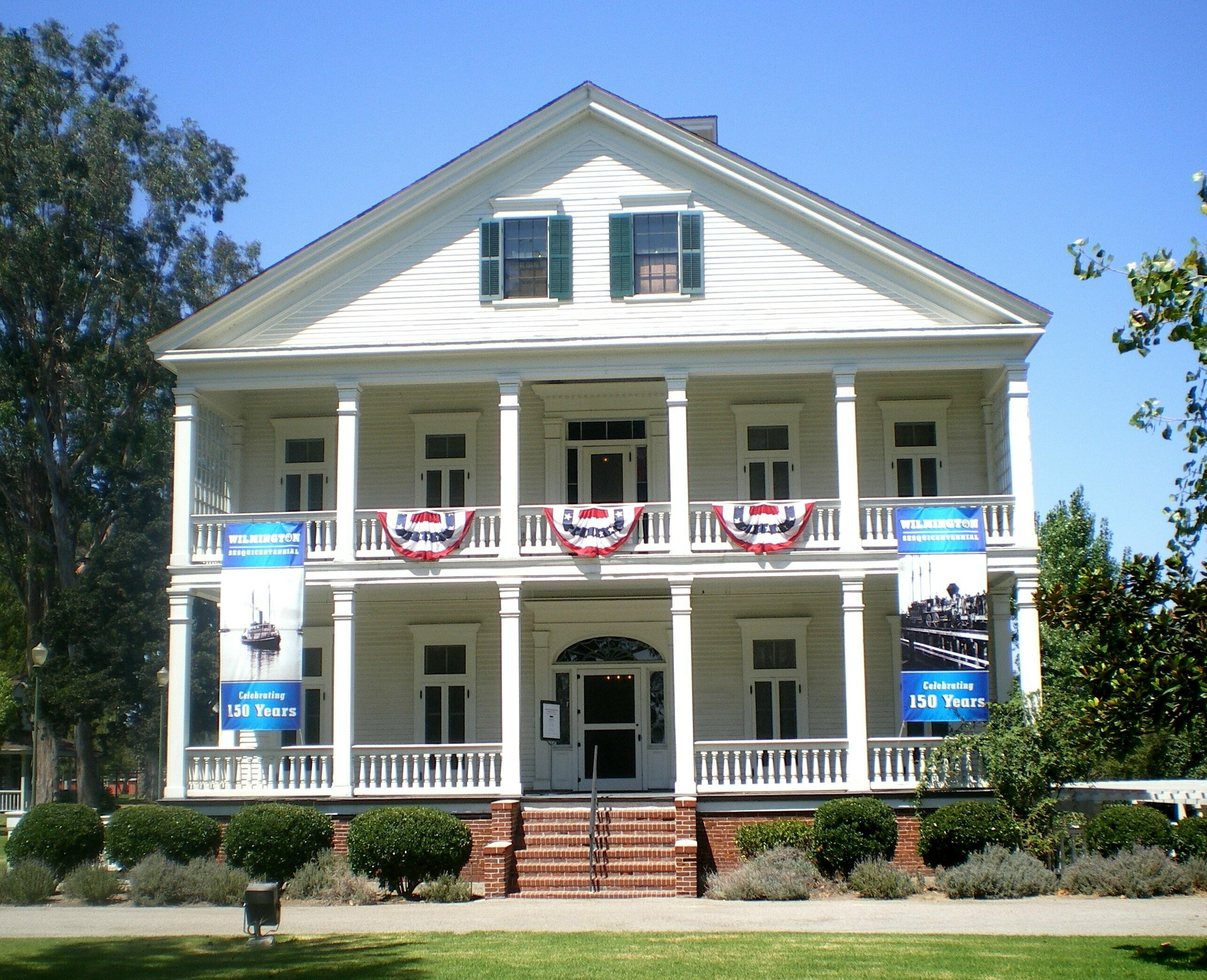
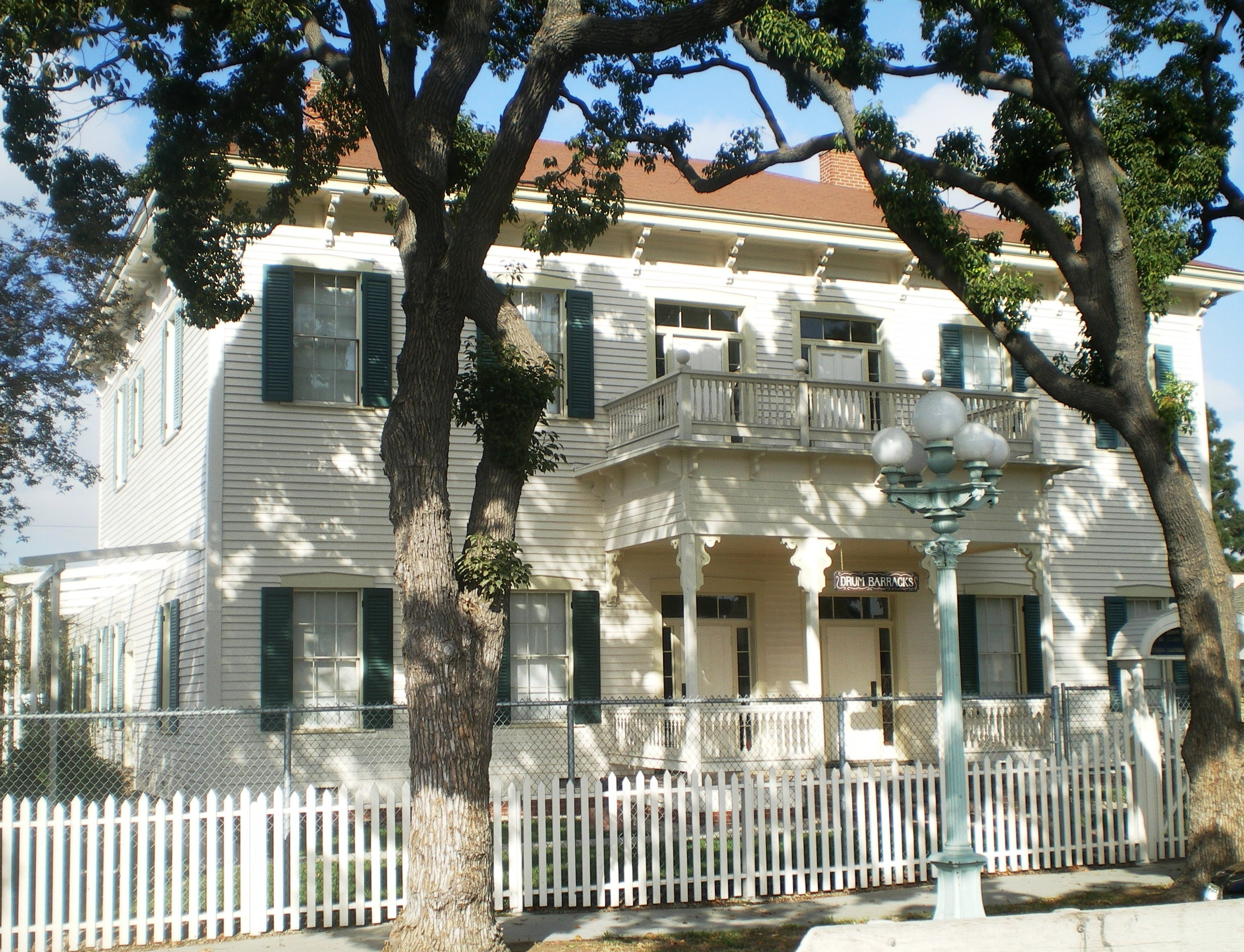
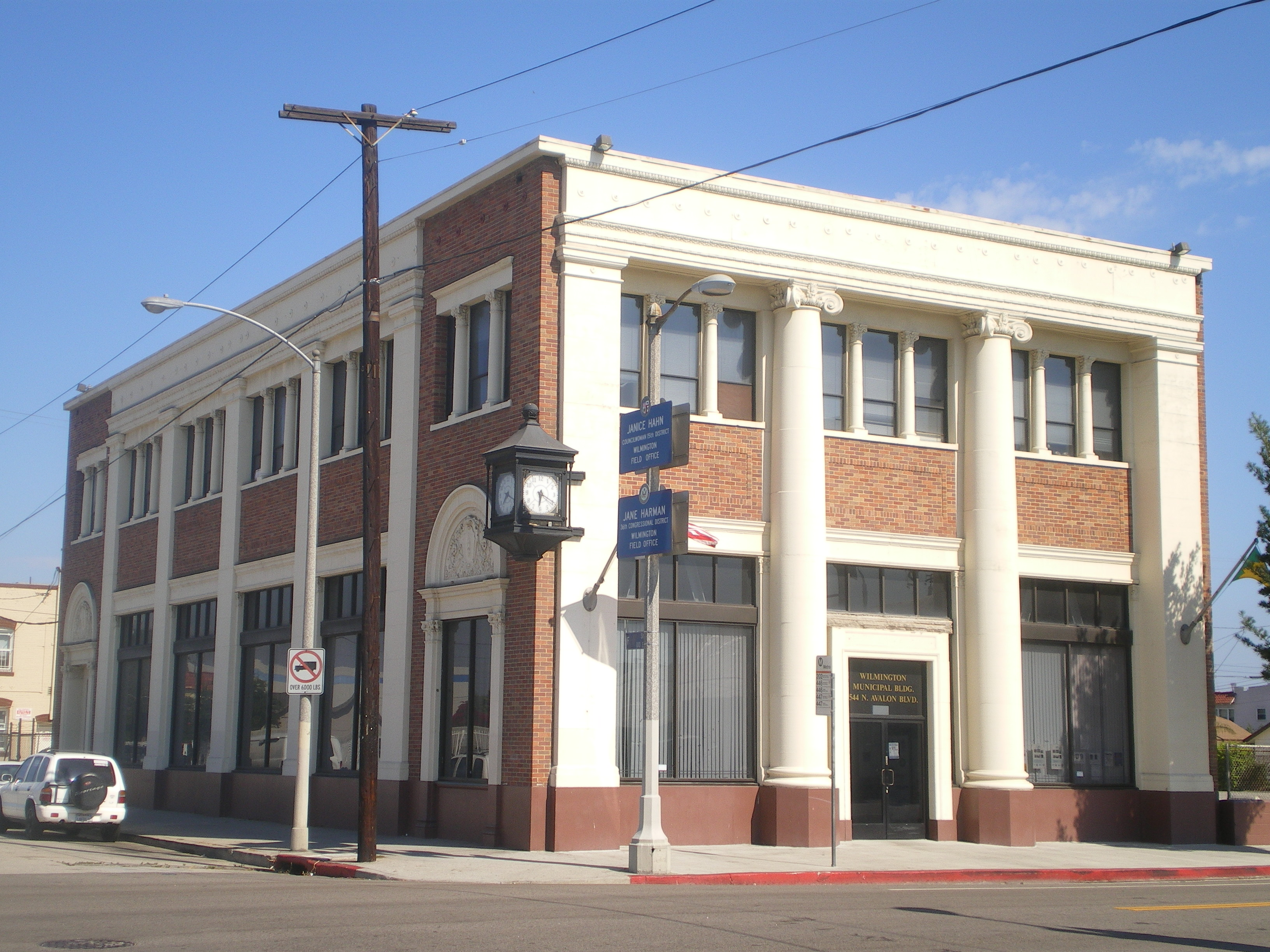
- Top: St. Peter & Paul's Church (left) and Banning House (right); bottom: Drum Barracks (left) and Wilmington Municipal Building (right).

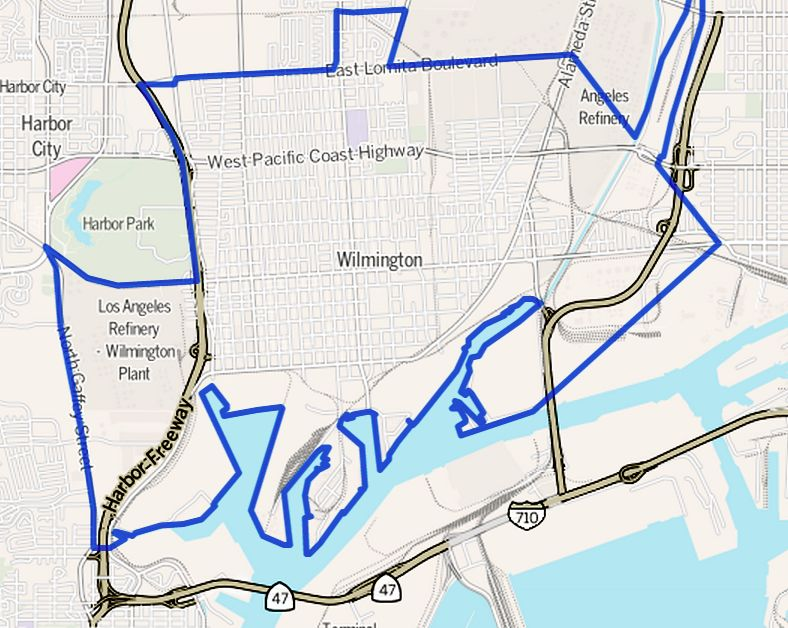
- Wilmington as outlined by the Los Angeles Times

- Location within Southern Los Angeles, to the west of the city of Long Beach
- Coordinates: 33.78°N 118.26167°W
- Country: United States of America
- State: California
- County: Los Angeles
- City: Los Angeles
- Named for: Wilmington, Delaware

Area
  - Total: 9.14 sq mi (23.7 km^{2})

Population
  - Total: 53,815
  - Density: 5,887/sq mi (2,273/km^{2})
- Time zone: Pacific (GMT -08:00)
- ZIP code: 90744
- Area codes: 310/424, 323, 562
- Website: Official website

Wilmington is a neighborhood in the South Bay and Harbor region of Los Angeles, California, covering 9.14 square miles (23.7 km^{2}).

Featuring a heavy concentration of industry and the third-largest oil field in the continental United States, this neighborhood has a high percentage of Latino and foreign-born residents. Nearly 20 percent of Wilmington’s total land area is taken up by oil refineries — roughly 3.5 times more area than is dedicated to open and accessible green spaces. During the COVID-19 pandemic, Wilmington had one of the highest death rates in all of Los Angeles County, exacerbated by elevated levels of industrial pollution.

It is the site of Banning High School, and ten other primary and secondary schools. Wilmington has six parks.

Wilmington was part of a 1784 Spanish land grant. It became a separate city in 1863, and it joined the city of Los Angeles in 1909. Places of interest include the headquarters U.S. Army for Southern California and the Drum Barracks built to protect the nascent Los Angeles harbor during the American Civil War.

== Geography ==
Wilmington shares borders with Carson to the north, Long Beach to the east, San Pedro to the south and west and Harbor City to the northwest.

== Demographics ==
A total of 53,815 people were living within Wilmington's 9.14 square miles, according to the 2010 U.S. census—averaging 5,887 people per square mile, among the lowest population densities in the city as a whole. The median age was 28. The percentages of people from birth through age 34 were among the county's highest. Population was estimated at 54,512 in 2008.

Wilmington is not considered very diverse ethnically, with a diversity index of 0.245. In 2000, Latinos made up 86.6% of the population, while non-Hispanic whites were at 6.4%, Asians at 4.8%, blacks at 2.6% and others at 1.7%. Mexico and Guatemala were the most common places of birth for the 44.5% of the residents who were born abroad, considered a high percentage of foreign-born when compared with the city and the county as a whole.

The $40,627 median household income in 2008 dollars was average for the city. Renters occupied 61.5% of the housing units, with homeowners occupying the rest. In 2000 there were 1,524 military veterans, or 4.6% of the population, relatively low in comparison to the city and county as a whole.

There is a Mexican-American community in Wilmington.

== History ==
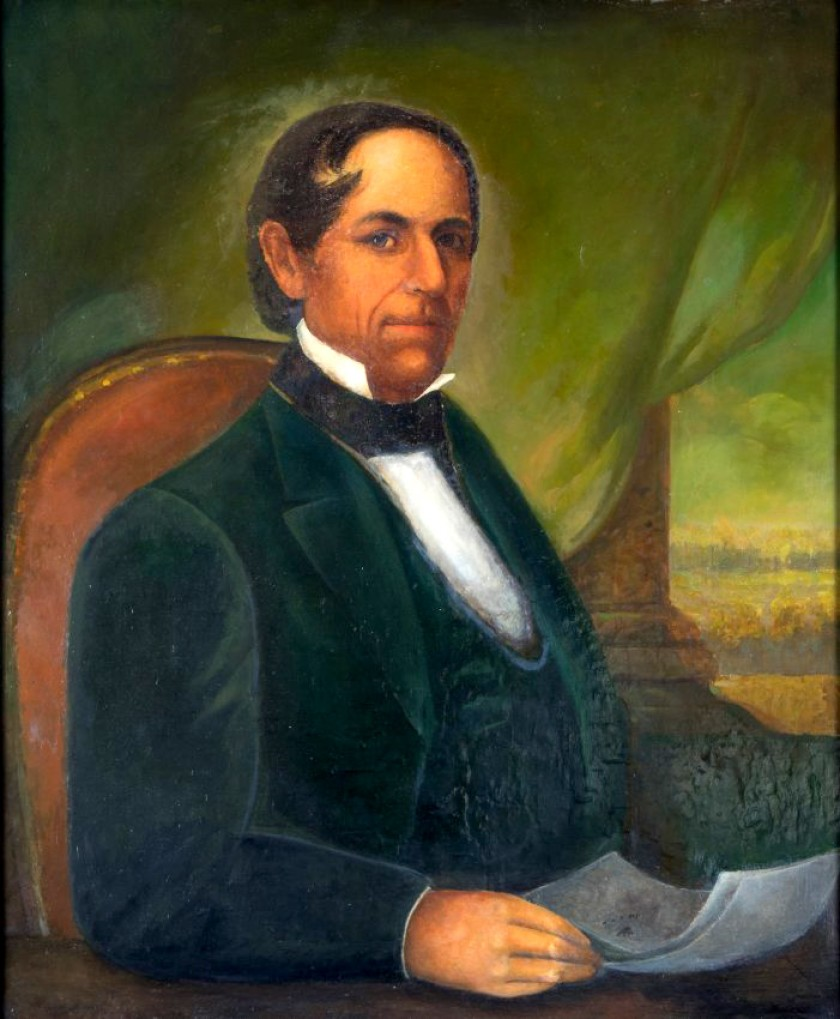
Don Manuel Domínguez, owner of Rancho San Pedro, which included all of modern-day Wilmington

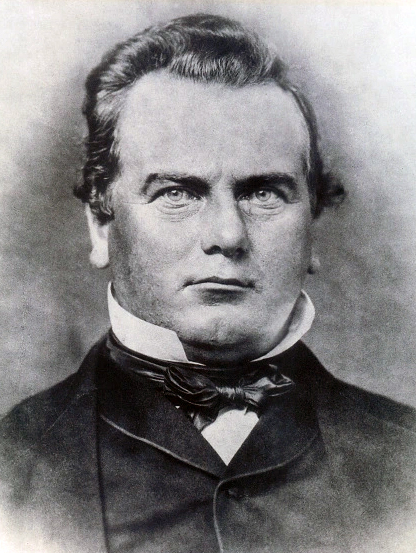
Phineas Banning

The area that is now Wilmington was inhabited by the Tongva people of Native Americans. Archeological work in the nearby Chowigna excavation show evidence of inhabitants as far back as 7,100 years ago.

The Spanish Empire expanded into this area when the Viceroy of New Spain commissioned Juan Rodríguez Cabrillo to explore the Pacific Ocean in 1542–1543. In 1784, the Spanish Crown deeded Rancho San Pedro, a tract of over 75,000 acres (300 km^{2}) in the area, to retired soldier Juan José Domínguez, for his service with the Portolà expedition into the area over a decade earlier.

Phineas Banning acquired the land that would become Wilmington from Manuel Dominguez, grand nephew and heir to Juan José Domínguez, in 1858 to build a harbor for the city of Los Angeles. Known as New San Pedro from 1858 to 1863, it was subsequently renamed Wilmington by Banning, a.k.a. “Father of the Harbor”, after his birthplace, Wilmington, Delaware.

In 1861, at the beginning of the Civil War, Banning and Benjamin Wilson gave the federal government 60 acres of land to build Drum Barracks to protect the nascent Los Angeles harbor from Confederate attack.

Wilmington was a township in the 1870 census. The township consisted of the present-day South Bay communities, Compton, western Long Beach, parts of Rattlesnake Island and Mormon Island which later evolved into Terminal Island. Census records report a population of 942 in 1870. The township had been named San Pedro Township in 1860.

Wilson College, precursor to the University of Southern California, opened in Wilmington in 1874 as the first coeducational college west of the Mississippi.

Los Angeles annexed Wilmington in 1909, and today it and neighboring San Pedro form the waterfront of one of the world's largest import/export centers. Citizens of Wilmington were dubious that annexation would be in their best interests, fearing that it would shift economic activity out of their city and towards Los Angeles. Because the city government of Los Angeles so strongly wanted to have the growing port inside the city limits, it made a number of promises to Wilmington and also to the equally-dubious citizens of the-then independent city of San Pedro. Among these promises were that $10 million would be invested in improvements to the port and that as much would be spent inside the city on public works as was collected in taxes.

In the 1920s, William Wrigley Jr. built innovative housing in Wilmington that was dubbed the “Court of Nations.” Filipinos, connected to their service in the United States Navy, began to settle in the Wilmington neighborhood.

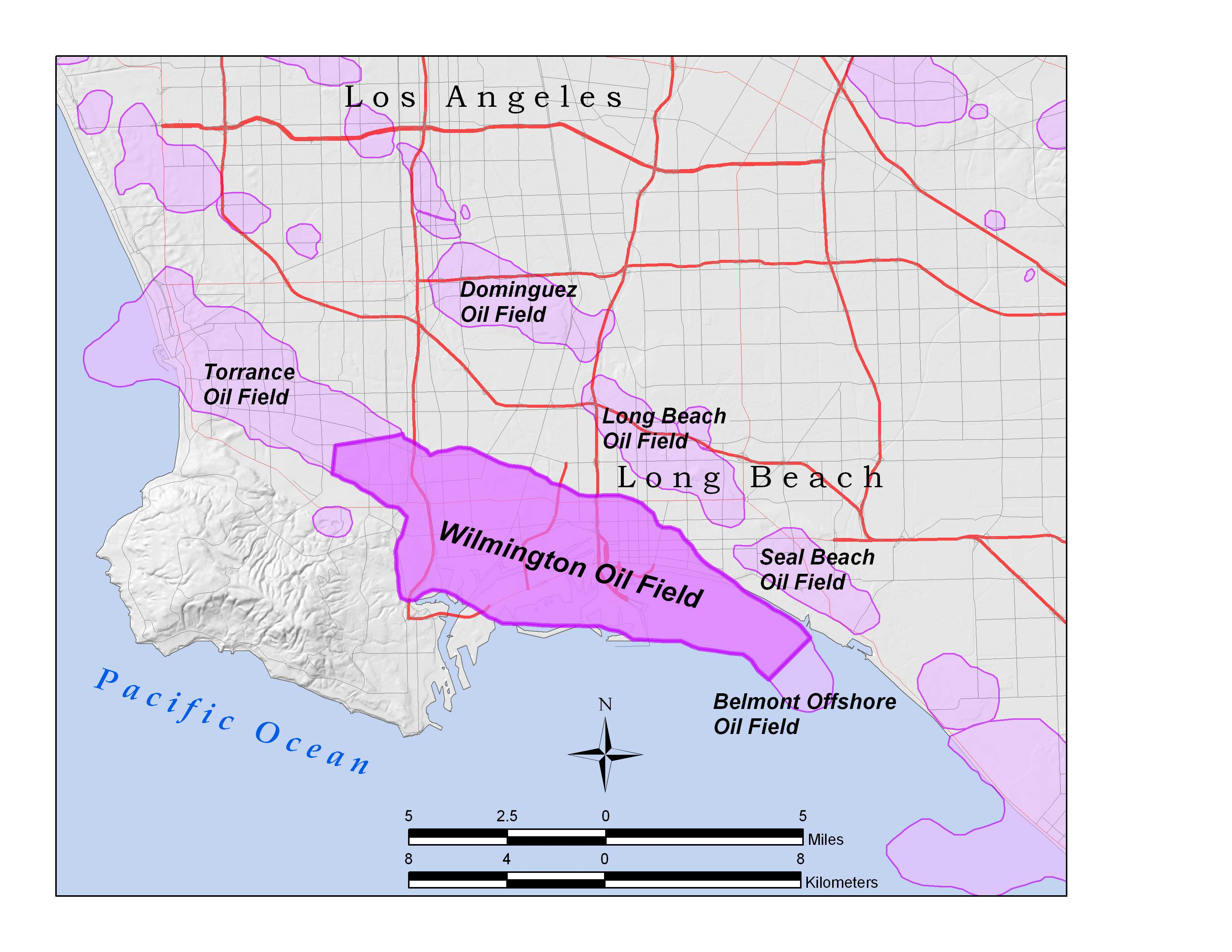
Wilmington Oil Field

Wilmington is adjacent to the Wilmington Oil Field, discovered in 1932. It is the third largest oil field in the continental United States. Consequently, there are at least 8 major refineries in the Wilmington area, many of them dating back to the original strike.

During World War II the United States Military operated the Los Angeles Port of Embarkation in Wilmington, from which soldiers and sailors were sent abroad to battle zones. The LAPE was controlled by the San Francisco Port of Embarkation from its inception in 1942 until late 1943 when it became autonomous. The California Shipbuilding Corporation, known for building victory ships during the war (although usually associated with Terminal Island), operated in Wilmington as well.

== Points of interest ==
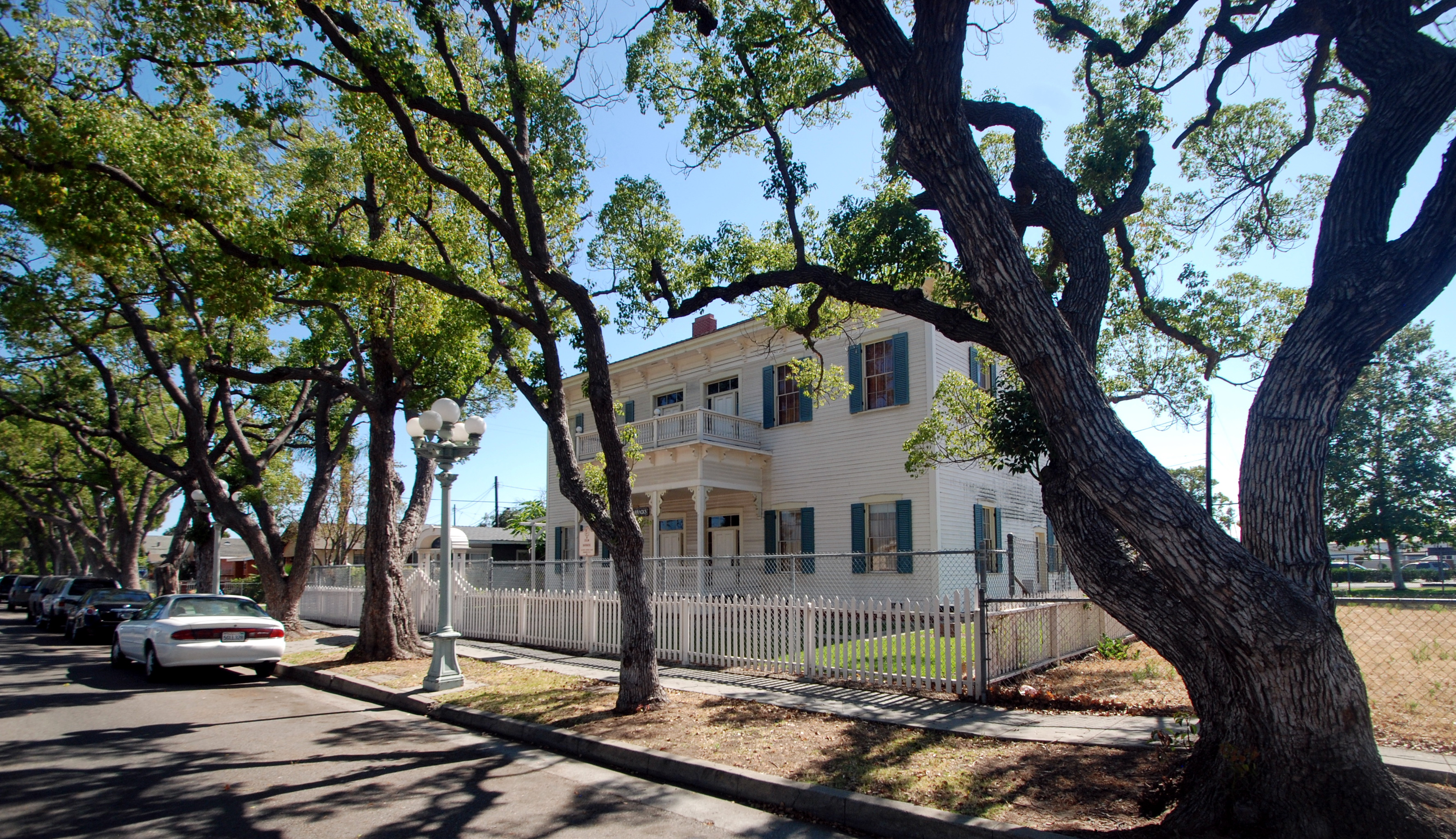
Drum Barracks

- Drum Barracks Civil War Museum – U.S. Army headquarters for Southern California and the Arizona territory during the Civil War.
  - Camp Drum Powder Magazine
- The first Der Wienerschnitzel restaurant (on Pacific Coast Highway, east of Figueroa Street).

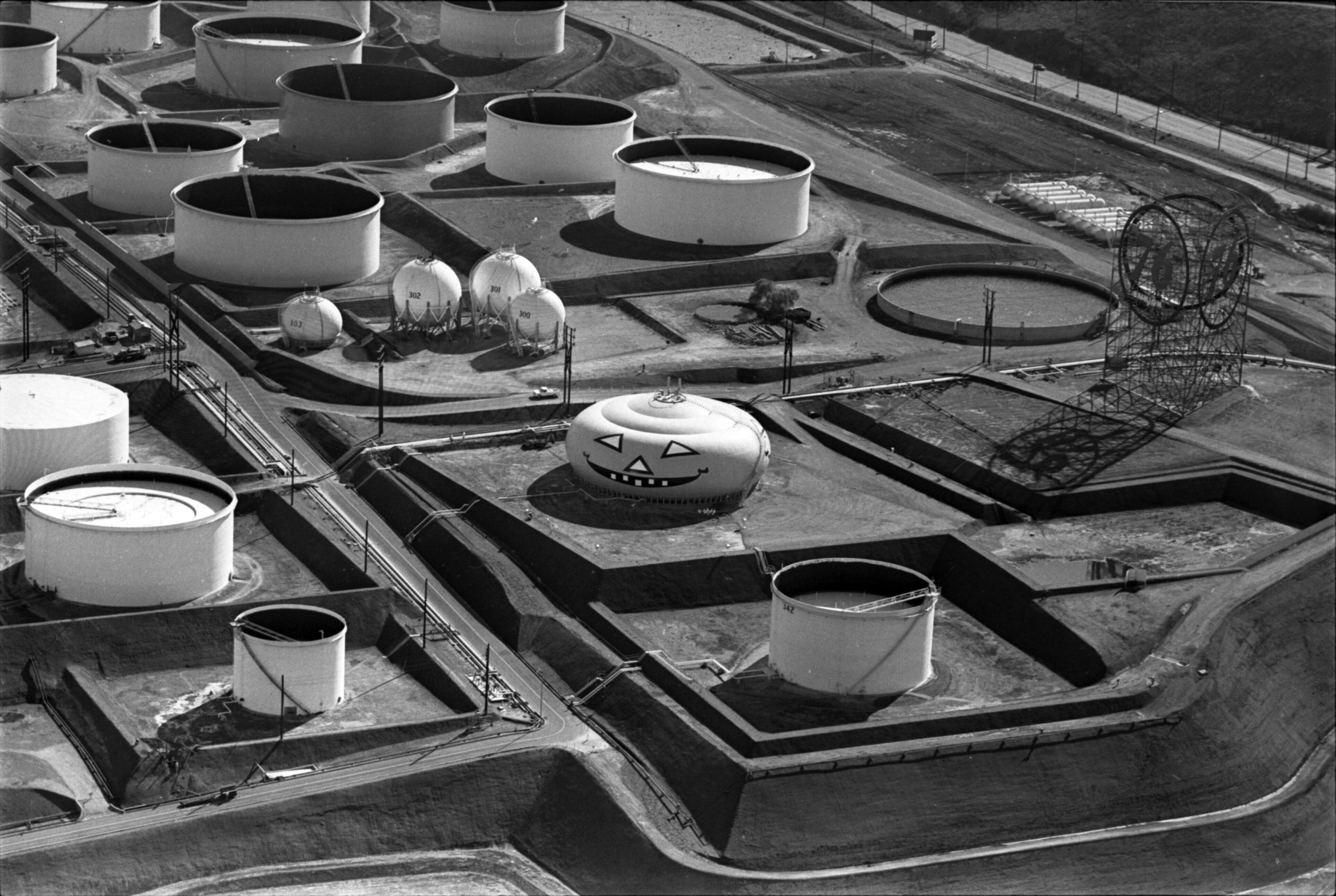
Union Oil Co. refinery in Wilmington with world's largest jack o'lantern, "Smilin' Jack", October 1965

- The Phillips 66 refinery in Wilmington is also home to the "world's largest jack-o'-lantern", which is a 3 million gallon (11.3 million liter) storage tank decorated every year for Halloween. Decorated annually since 1952 (back when it was owned by Union Oil), the jack-o'-lantern draws 30,000 visitors annually.
- The Banning Museum - Phineas Banning—entrepreneur, the founder of the city of Wilmington, and “the Father of the Port of Los Angeles”—built the 23-room residence in 1864.

== Government and infrastructure ==
The Los Angeles County Department of Health Services operates the Torrance Health Center in Harbor Gateway, Los Angeles, near Torrance and serving Wilmington.

The United States Postal Service Wilmington Post Office is located at 1008 North Avalon Boulevard.

The community of Wilmington is located in the Council District 15 within the City of Los Angeles.

The community of Wilmington is represented by one Neighborhood Council, Wilmington Neighborhood Council.

== Education ==
Only 5.1% of Wilmington residents aged 25 or older had completed a four-year degree by 2000, a low figure when compared with the city and the county at large, and the percentage of those residents with less than a high school diploma was high for the county. Wilmington is home to Harbor Teacher Preparation Academy, ranked the top high school in the city of Los Angeles and the fourth-best school in California.

=== Schools ===
Wilmington is part of the Los Angeles Unified School District. The area is in Board District 7. As of September 2009, the leadership of District 7 was under Interim Superintendent Dr. George McKenna.

Los Angeles Harbor College is in Wilmington, at 1111 Figueroa Place, Wilmington, CA 90744.

Secondary and primary schools include:

- Phineas Banning Senior High School, LAUSD, 1527 Lakme Avenue
- Avalon High School, LAUSD continuation, 1425 North Avalon Boulevard
- Pacific Harbor Christian School, private K-12, 1530 Wilmington Boulevard
- Broad Avenue Elementary School, LAUSD, 24815 Broad Avenue
- Wilmington Christian School, private, 24910 South Avalon Boulevard
- Wilmington Middle School, LAUSD, 1700 Gulf Avenue
- Fries Avenue Elementary School, LAUSD, 1301 Fries Avenue
- Gulf Avenue Elementary School, LAUSD, 828 West L Street
- Wilmington Park Elementary School, LAUSD, 1140 Mahar Avenue
- St. Peter and St. Paul Elementary School, private, 706 Bay View Avenue
- Hawaiian Avenue Elementary School, LAUSD, 540 Hawaiian Avenue
- Harry Bridges Span School, LAUSD 1235 Broad Avenue
- George De La Torre Jr. Elementary School, LAUSD, 500 Island Avenue, Wilmington, CA 90744
- Harbor Teacher Preparation Academy, LAUSD, 1111 Figueroa Place, Wilmington, CA 90744

=== Libraries ===
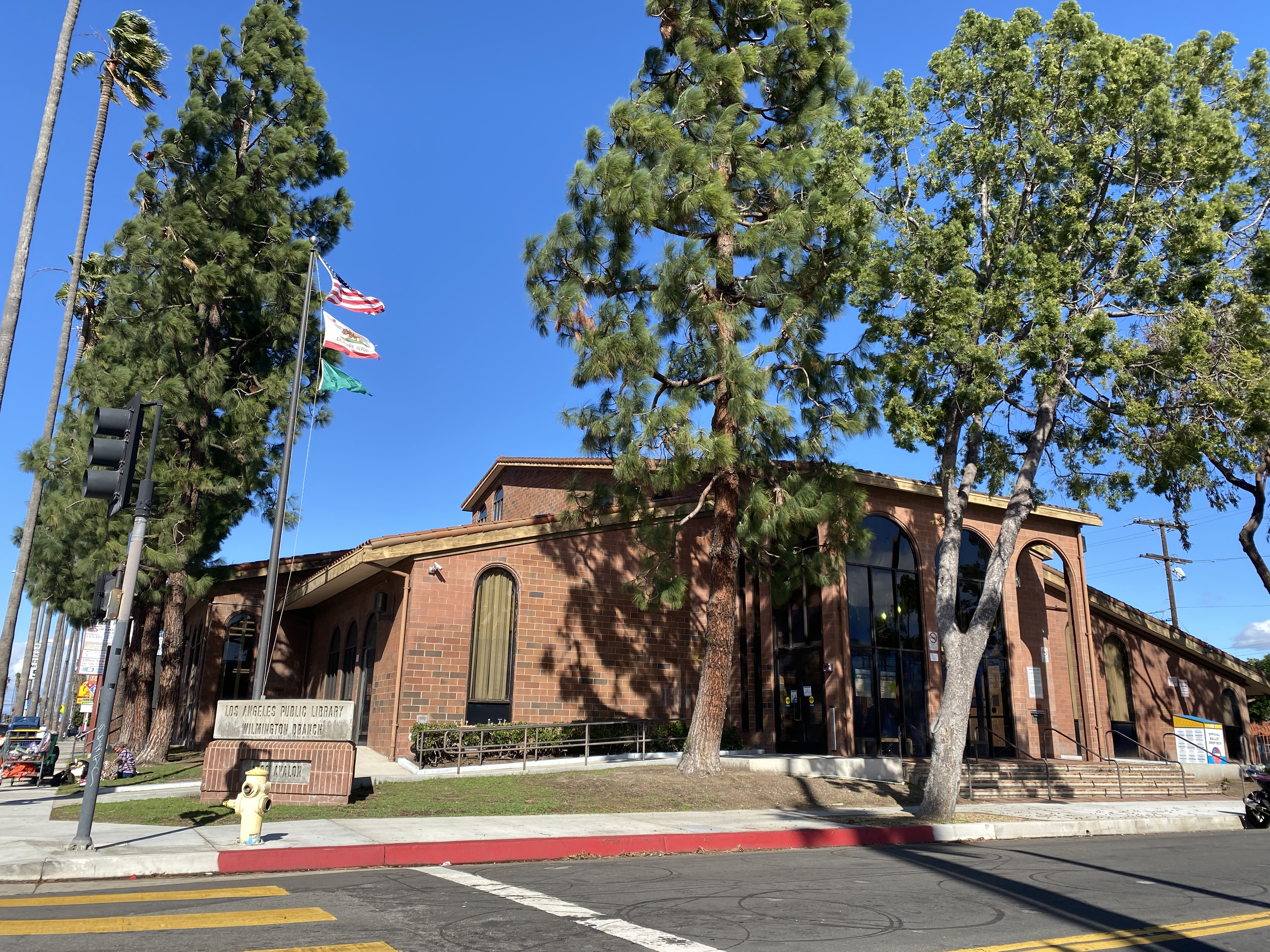
Wilmington Branch Library (current)

Los Angeles Public Library operates the Wilmington Branch.

== Parks and recreation ==
Fountains at the Wilmington Waterfront Park.

- Banning Recreation Center, 1331 Eubank Avenue. Auditorium, baseball diamond (lighted), basketball courts (lighted/indoor, unlighted/outdoor), children's play area, picnic tables, tennis courts (lighted).
- East Wilmington Greenbelt Community Center, 918 North Sanford Avenue. Basketball courts (lighted/indoor), class room, after school programs, day camps.
- East Wilmington Greenbelt Pocket Park, 1300 East O Street
- Wilmington Recreation Center, 325 North Neptune Avenue. Auditorium, baseball diamond (lighted/unlighted), basketball courts (unlighted/outdoors, lighted/indoors), children's play area, community room, four picnic areas with tables.
- Wilmington Senior Citizen Center, 1371 Eubank Avenue. Auditorium, baseball diamond (lighted), basketball courts (lighted/Indoor, unlighted/outdoor), children's play area, indoor gym (without weights), picnic tables, tennis courts (lighted).
- The Wilmington Waterfront Park, opened in June 2011 between the Port of Los Angeles and Wilmington. (This park is not, in fact, on any waterfront: the name is a misnomer.)

== Notable people ==
- Cayetano Apablasa (1847–1889), member of the Los Angeles Common Council
- John Avalos (1964-), member of the San Francisco Board of Supervisors
- Wilder W. Hartley (1901–1970), Los Angeles City Council member, 1939–41
- L.T. Fisher, publisher of Wilmington newspapers in the 1870s
- Asa Keyes (1877–1934), Los Angeles County district attorney, 1923-1928
- George H. Moore (1871–1958), Los Angeles City Council member, 1943–51
- Eric Plunk (1963–), former pitcher for the Oakland Athletics and the Cleveland Indians
- Thuy Trang (1973–2001), actress
- Charmian London (1871-1955), writer, second wife of Jack London

== Gallery ==
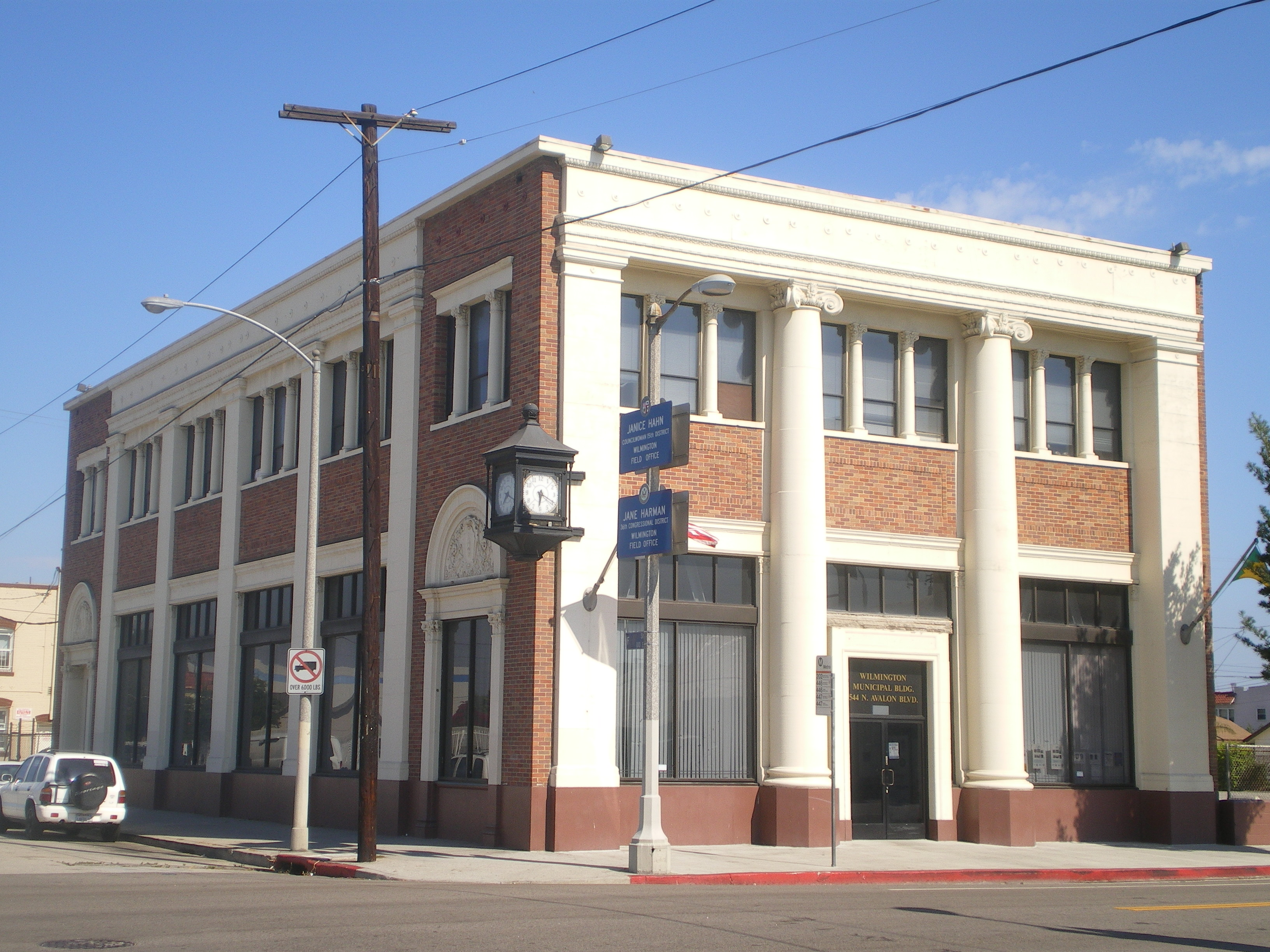
Wilmington Municipal Building, 544 N. Avalon Boulevard

Foodman Market, on PCH in Wilmington, 1977

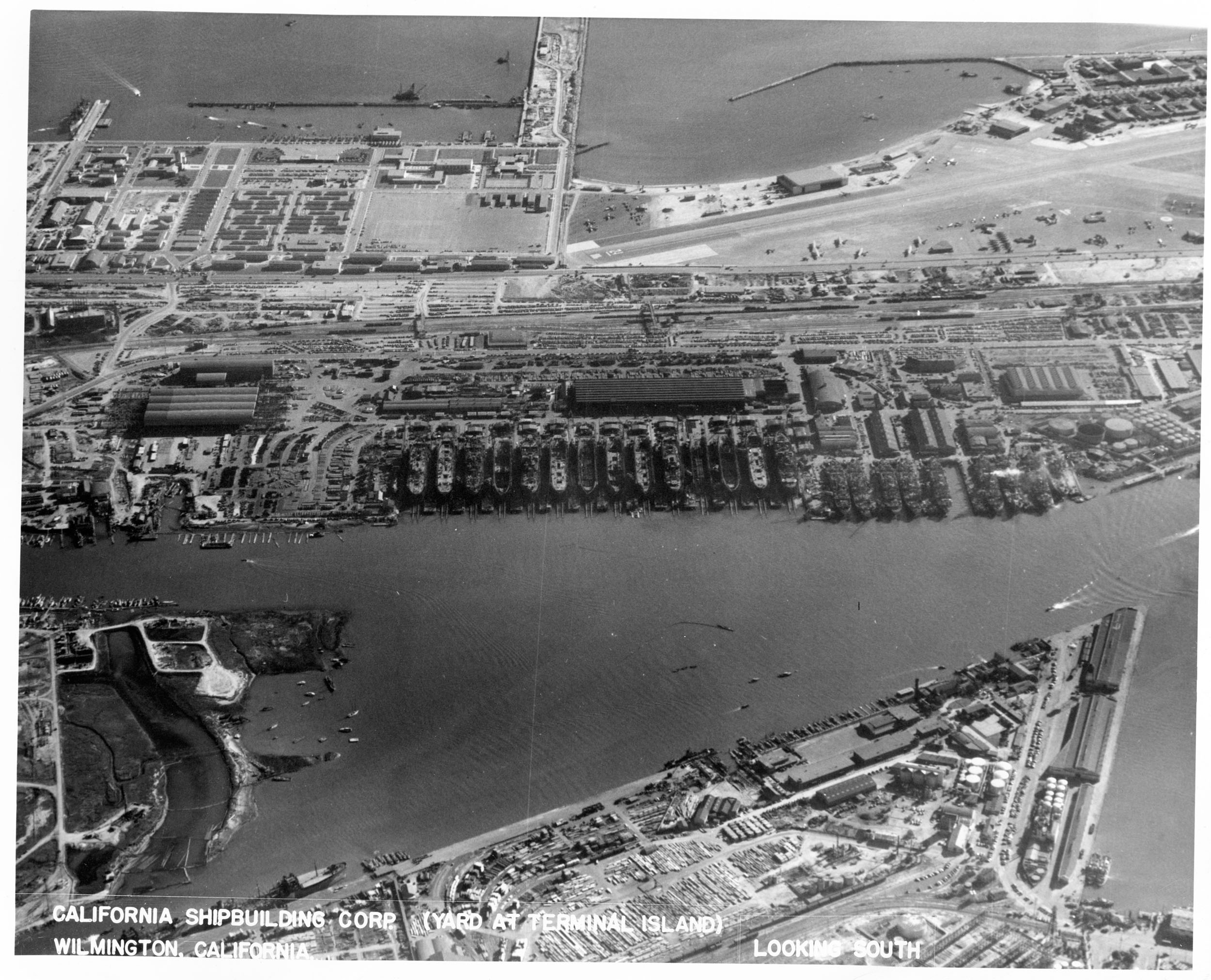
California Shipbuilding Corporation yard in Wilmington, 1944

Historic Banning Park Home, American Colonial style

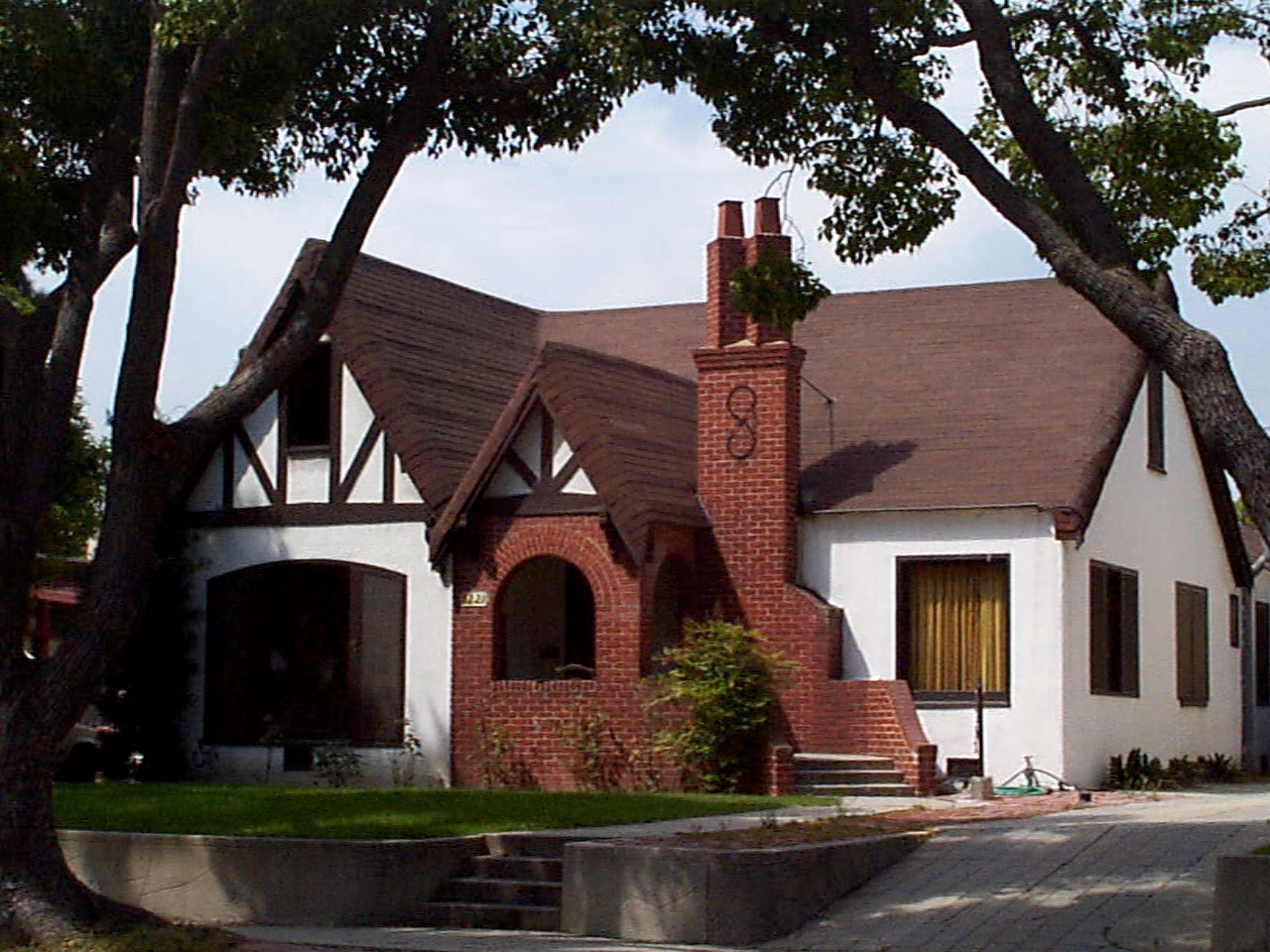
Banning Park, Tudor Revival architecture

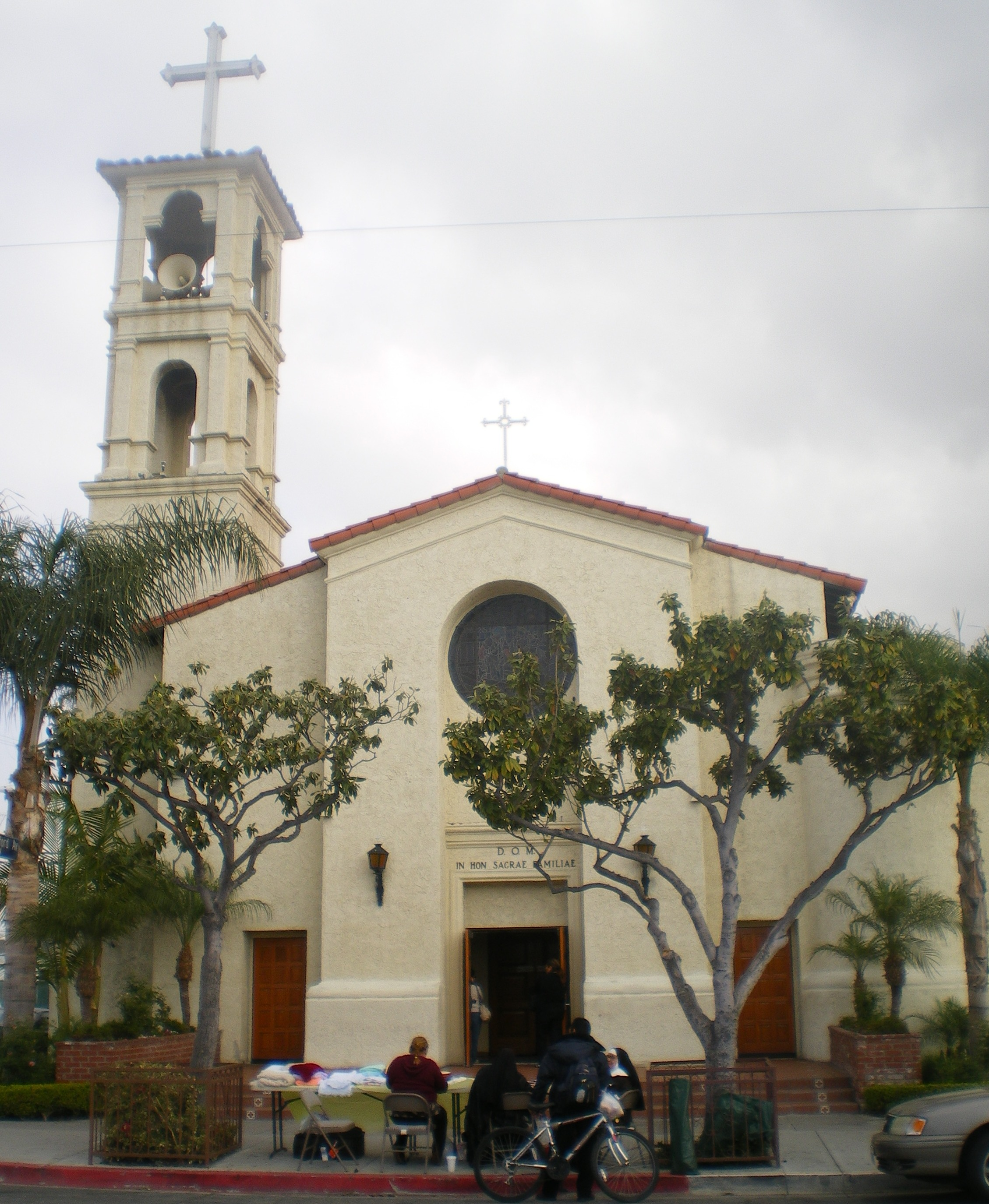
Holy Family Catholic Church

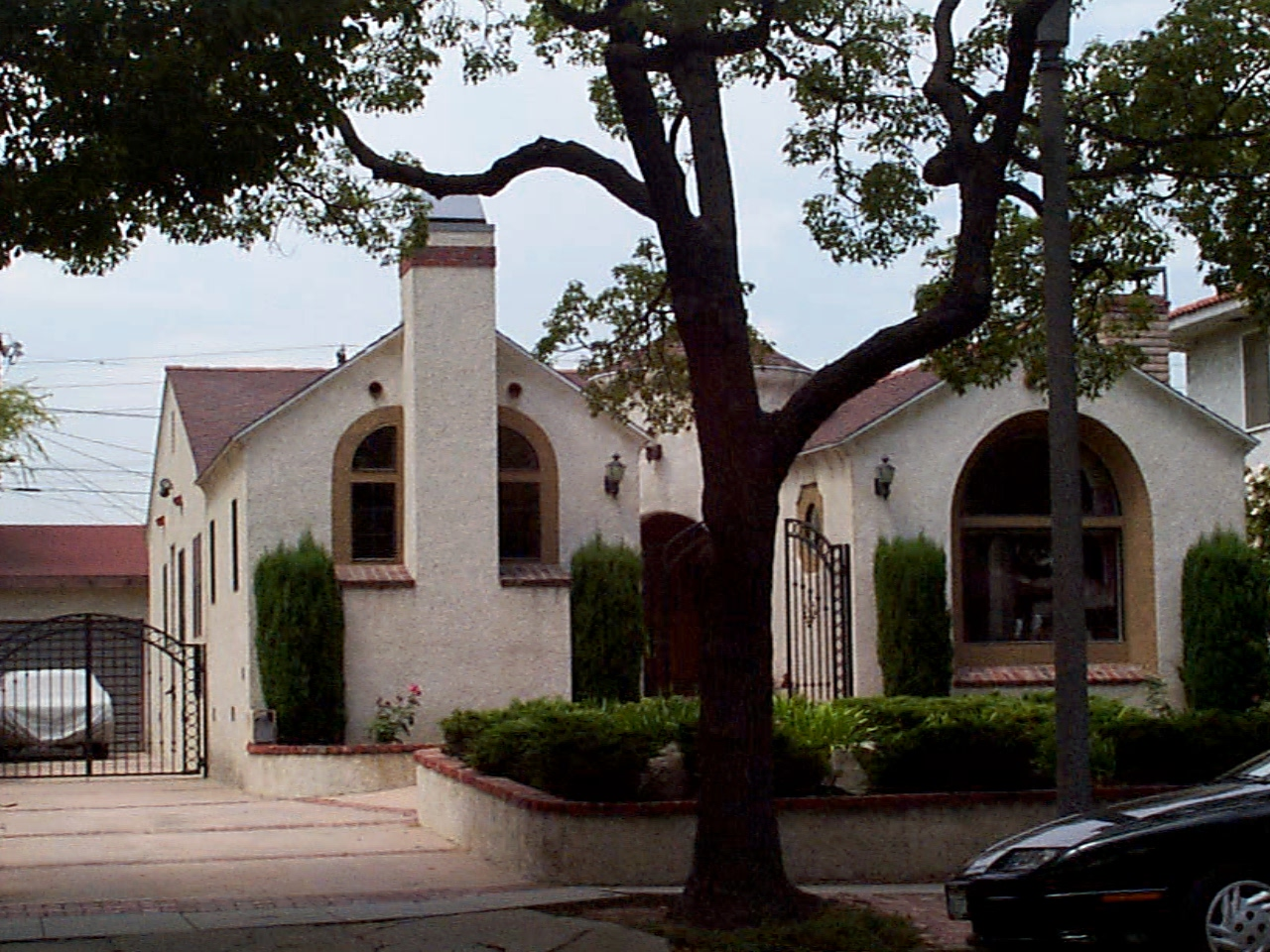
Spanish architecture inspired Banning Park home

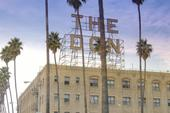
The Don

== See also ==
- List of Los Angeles Historic-Cultural Monuments in the Harbor area
- Get Out and Push Railroad
- New York Port of Embarkation (NYPOE)
- San Francisco Port of Embarkation (SFPOE)
- Hampton Roads Port of Embarkation
- Seattle Port of Embarkation
- Boston Port of Embarkation (BPOE)
- New Orleans Port of Embarkation
- Charleston Port of Embarkation (CPOE)
