= Harbor View House =

Coordinates: 33.7355°N 118.2808°W

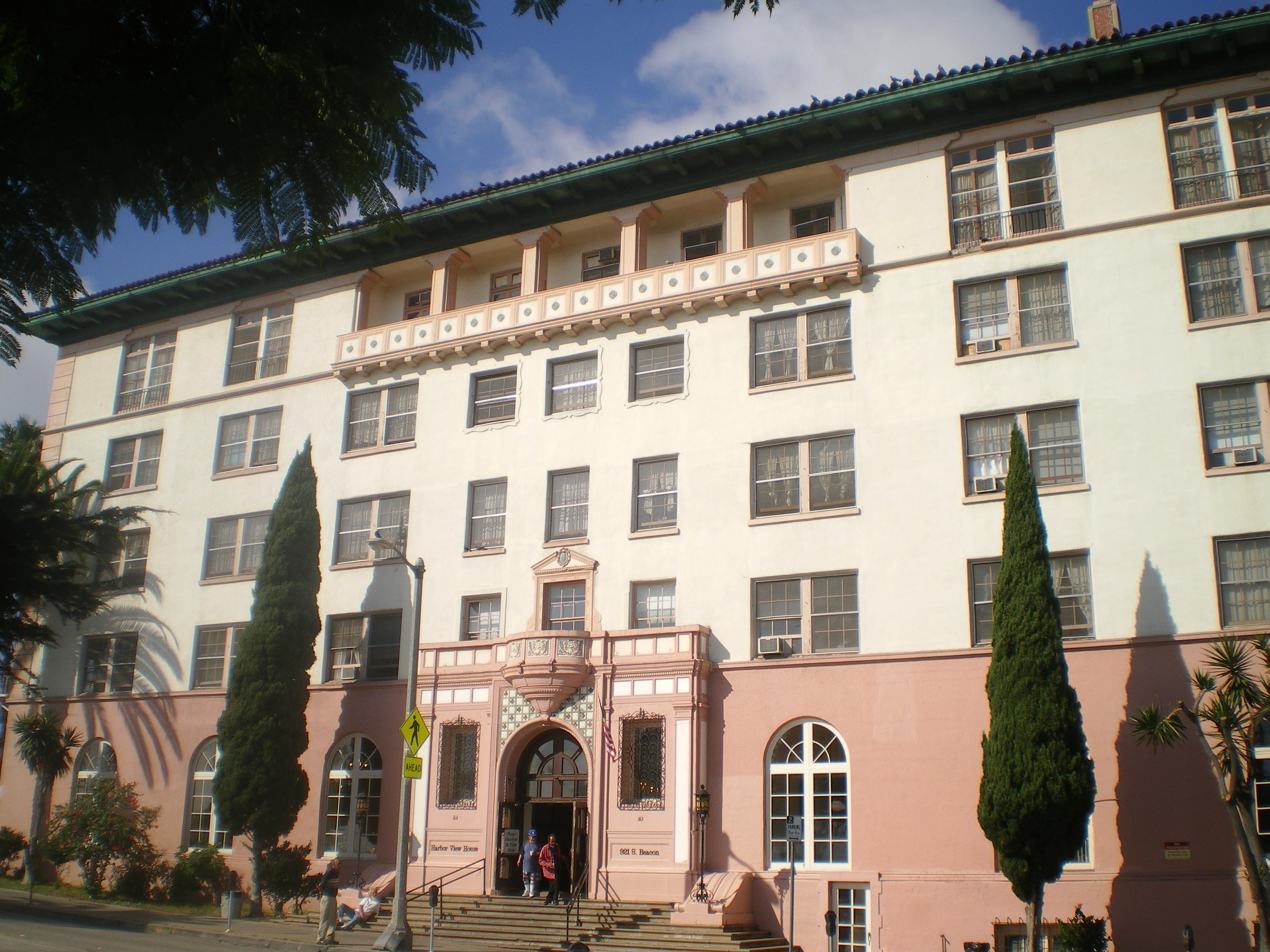
- Harbor View House

- Location within the Los Angeles metropolitan area
- Location: 921 Beacon St., San Pedro, Los Angeles, California

History
- Built: 1926

Site notes
- Architectural style: Spanish Colonial Revival
- Governing body: private

Los Angeles Historic-Cultural Monument
- Designated: August 25, 1982
- Reference no.: 252

Harbor View House, formerly the Army and Navy Y.M.C.A., is a Los Angeles Historic-Cultural Monument (HCM #252) located in the San Pedro section of Los Angeles, California, near the Port of Los Angeles. It is a five-story Spanish Colonial Revival style structure located on a bluff overlooking the harbor.

== History ==
The Army and Navy Y.M.C.A. was dedicated in 1926 as a recreation center for servicemen at Fort MacArthur, offering 300 dormitory rooms, a gymnasium, running track, banquet room, patio, pool, boxing and wrestling rooms, and a coffee shop. It provided recreation and temporary quarters for over four million men during World War II, and was visited by celebrities, including Bob Hope and Lucille Ball. The facility was converted to civilian use in 1947, offering accommodations to young travelers and senior citizens.

From September 1967 to November 2018, as the Harbor View House, the building operated as a residence serving the mentally ill. It was licensed as a 204-bed Adult Residential Facility, Mentally Ill by the California Department of Social Services, and an 83-bed Intermediate Care Nursing Facility by the California Department of Public Health Services. It was owned and operated by HealthView, a nonprofit organization. It also housed HealthView Behavioral Services an outpatient mental health clinic operated under contract from the Los Angeles Department of Mental Health.

In 1994, the building underwent seismic retrofit renovation after receiving damage from the Northridge earthquake. The swimming pool was filled in, and offices were created in the space above the pool during this renovation. Many features still remain, like the coffee shop, gymnasium, and running track.

== Present day ==
Harbor View House was sold in April 2018 to a developer planning to convert the historic building into a combined residential-commercial property. The terms of the sale allowed HealthView to rent the space until July 2019. However, after the elevator broke down in November 2018, all residents of Harbor View House were moved out. The building currently sits empty awaiting renovation.

== See also ==
- List of Los Angeles Historic-Cultural Monuments in the Harbor area
