= Banning House =

Historic house in California, United States

- U.S. National Register of Historic Places
- California Historical Landmark
- Los Angeles Historic-Cultural Monument
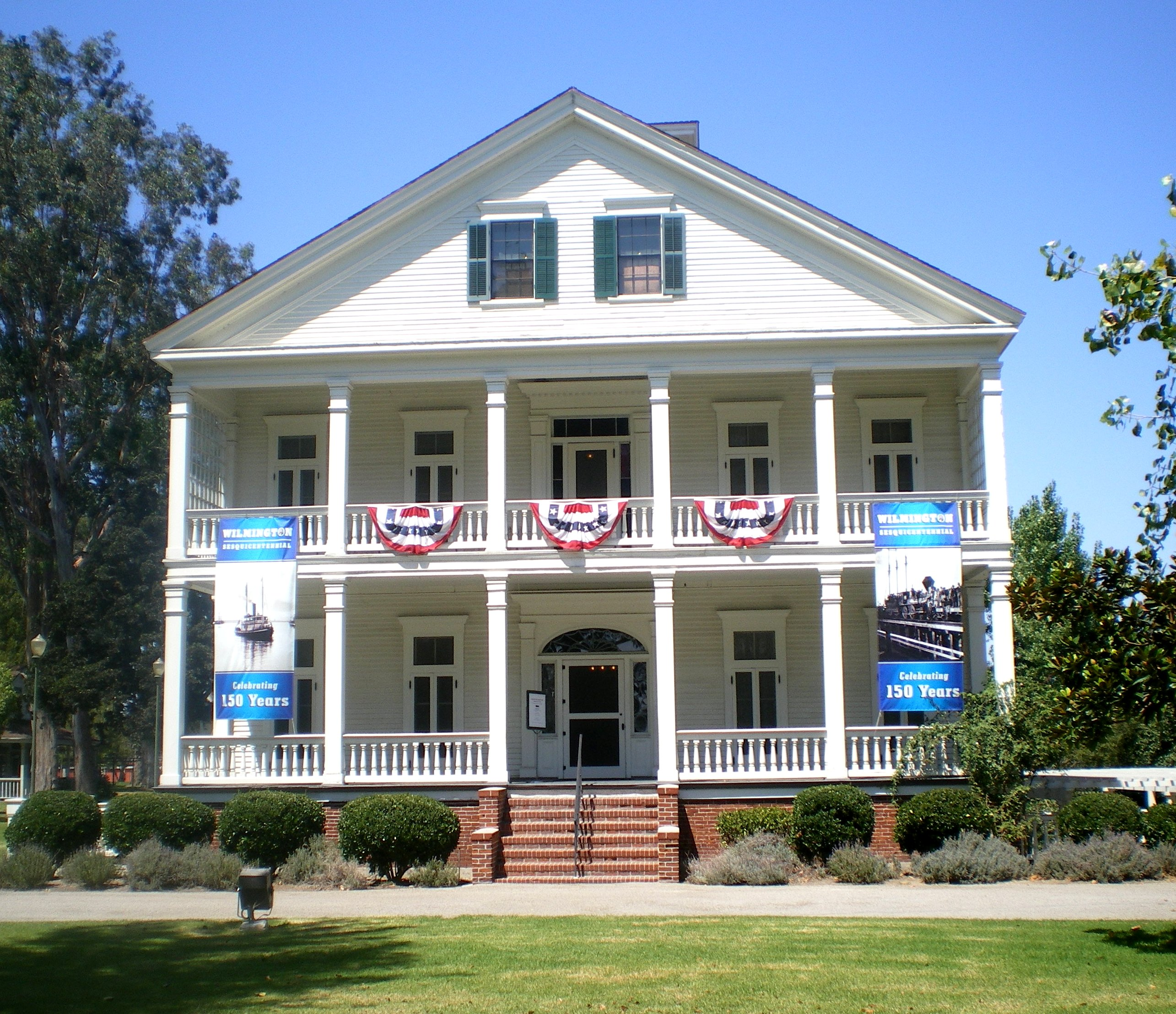
- Banning House, August 2008

- Location within the Los Angeles metropolitan area Location within California Location within the United States
- Location: 401 E. M St., Wilmington, Los Angeles, California
- Coordinates: 33°47′25″N 118°15′26″W
- Built: 1863
- Architect: Phineas Banning
- Architectural style: Greek Revival-Victorian
- NRHP reference No.: 71000160
- CHISL No.: 147
- LAHCM No.: 25

Significant dates
- Added to NRHP: May 6, 1971
- Designated CHISL: 1935
- Designated LAHCM: 1963

Banning House, also known as the General Phineas Banning Residence Museum, is a historic Greek Revival-Victorian home in the Wilmington section of Los Angeles, California. Built in 1863 by Phineas Banning near the original San Pedro Bay, it remained in the Banning family until 1925 and has been owned by the City of Los Angeles since 1927. The home, barn and gardens are now operated as a museum. The Banning House property, also known as Banning Park, has been designated as a city Los Angeles Historic-Cultural Monument and state California Historical Landmark and has been federally listed on the National Register of Historic Places.

== History and architecture ==
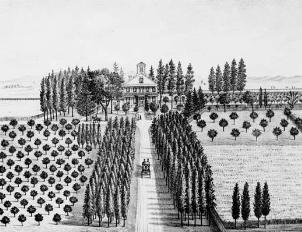
Early drawing of Banning House from collections of Los Angeles Public Library.

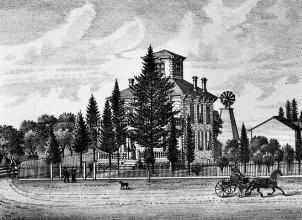
Image of early Banning House from the Los Angeles Public Library collection.

Banning House was designed by Phineas Banning, and has been described as "one of the best examples of Greek Revival architecture in the west." It originally had 30 rooms, but some rooms have been combined, and the house now has 24 rooms. According to a history of the house written by its curator, Banning recruited help to build the house from shipwrights, blacksmiths, carpenters, and artisans employed on clipper ships visiting the Wilmington harbor. Banning was reported to have lavishly entertained the ships' captains while they were at Wilmington, encouraging them to stay in port and seal up leaks in their ships with tar from the La Brea Tar Pits. The story goes: "Strangely enough Banning repeated this warning (about leaky ships) over and over for about three years until his mansion was completed in 1864."

The house was a departure from the adobe haciendas that predominated in Southern California at the time and became a showplace. During Banning's life, the house was the site of parties, or "regales" as Banning called them, attended by United States senators, congressmen, governors, foreign dignitaries, ship captains, Army officers, and business leaders. It has been said that "no home in all California represents the horse and carriage era more fully than the Banning Mansion, where for decades Phineas entertained the elite of the social, economic, and political world." The house was also reportedly the site of "the first yachting party on the West Coast."

Banning arrived in Los Angeles in 1851 and built successful transportation businesses, including ships, railroads, and stage coach lines running from Wilmington to Los Angeles, San Bernardino, and Fort Yuma. He founded Wilmington (named after his hometown of Wilmington, Delaware) in 1858, built the first railroad in Los Angeles (the Los Angeles and San Pedro Railroad) in 1869, designed and promoted the first breakwater at the Los Angeles harbor, and is considered the "Father of the Port of Los Angeles." Banning was reportedly fond of walking up the stairs of the house to his fourth floor cupola where he would watch the ships arriving with cargoes. He was also elected to the California legislature in 1867 and 1869. Banning lived in the house for more than 20 years until his death in 1885. Banning died at age 53 after being knocked down and run over by a passing express wagon while visiting San Francisco.

== Operation as a museum ==
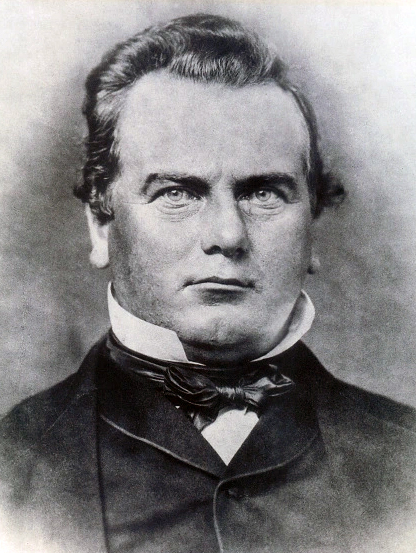
Phineas Banning

After Phineas Banning died, Hancock Banning maintained the residence until his death in 1894, and the house continued to be occupied by the Banning family until 1925. In 1927, the house and grounds were purchased by the City of Los Angeles to create a city park for the residents of Wilmington. In 1934, the Los Angeles Board of Park Commissioners proposed restoring the house, and the Banning family donated many of the original furnishings and equipment. Motion picture studios, including Twentieth-Century Fox, Warner Brothers and Paramount, contributed wallpapers to conform to the Civil War era. Following the restoration, the formal dedication took place in 1936 and was attended by Governor Frank Merriam, Senator William Gibbs McAdoo, and Mayor Frank L. Shaw. It opened to the public in 1938, closed in 1941 at the start of World War II, and did not reopen until 1952.

The house is operated as the General Phineas Banning Residence Museum. In addition to the house and its furnishings, the museum includes a basement-level gallery with photographs depicting the history of the port, the Banning family, and Wilmington. The museum also includes a large display of 19th century stagecoaches located in the barn and a one-room school house adjacent to the house. The gardens include eucalyptus trees (reputed to be the first to be planted in California) and large wisteria vines planted in the late 19th century.

The museum is open for docent-led tours Tuesday through Thursdays (12:30, 1:30 and 2:30) and Saturdays through Sundays (12:30, 1:30, 2:30 and 3:30); a $5 donation is requested for persons 12 years and older.

== Historic designations ==
Banning Park, including the Banning House, barn and gardens, was designated California Historical Landmarks in 1935. After the creation of the Los Angeles Cultural Heritage Commission in 1962, the house became one of the earliest sites designated as a Banning Park (HCM #25) in October 1963. It was also the sixth site in Los Angeles to be listed on the National Register of Historic Places, receiving its listing in May 1971.

California Historical Landmark Marker NO. 147 at the site reads:

- NO. 147 BANNING PARK - General Phineas Banning, State Senator and pioneer in the development of transportation in Southern California, built this house in the 1850s, soon after founding the town of Wilmington. He and his family lived here until his death in 1885. In 1927 the property was deeded to the city.

== Gallery ==
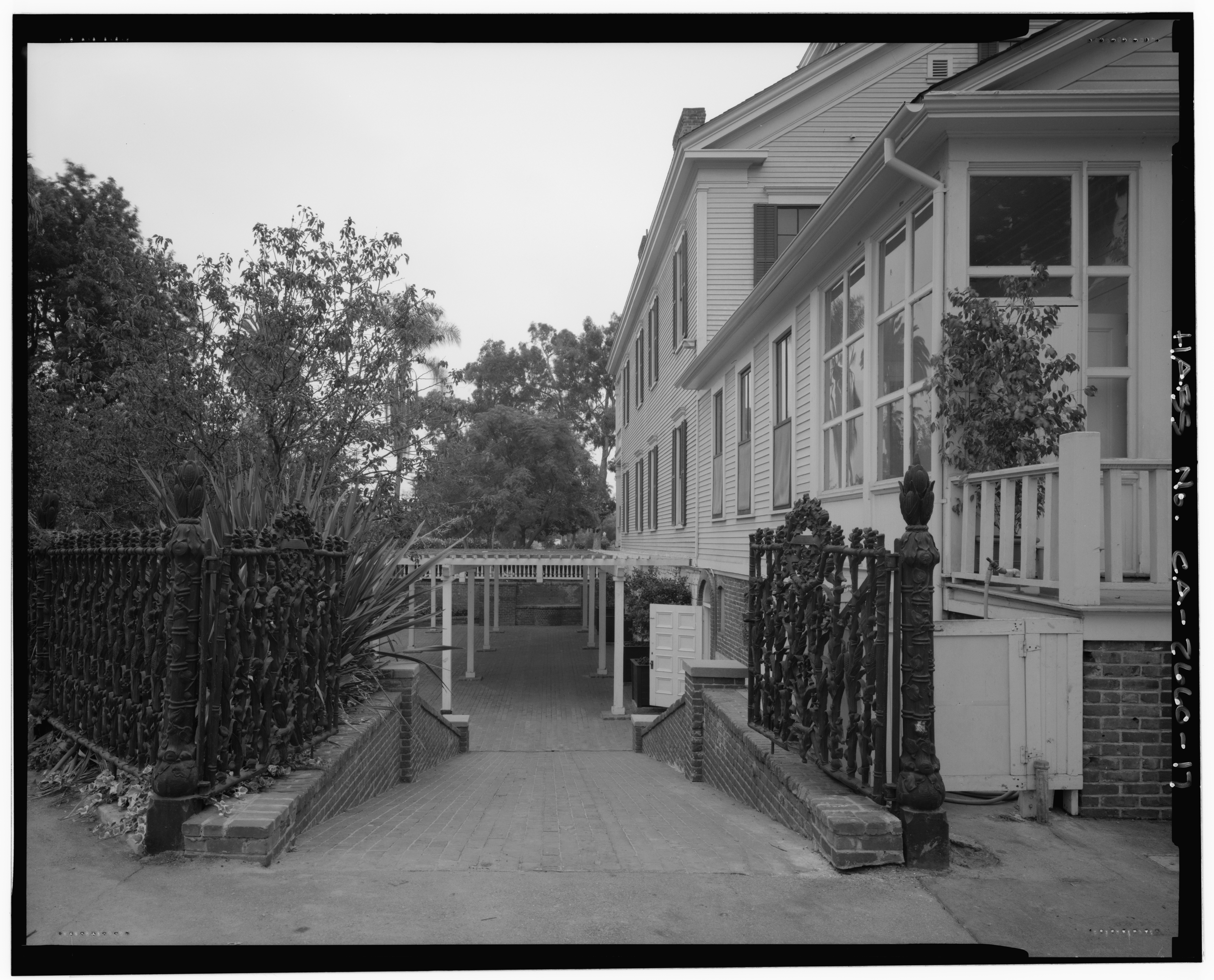
East side view

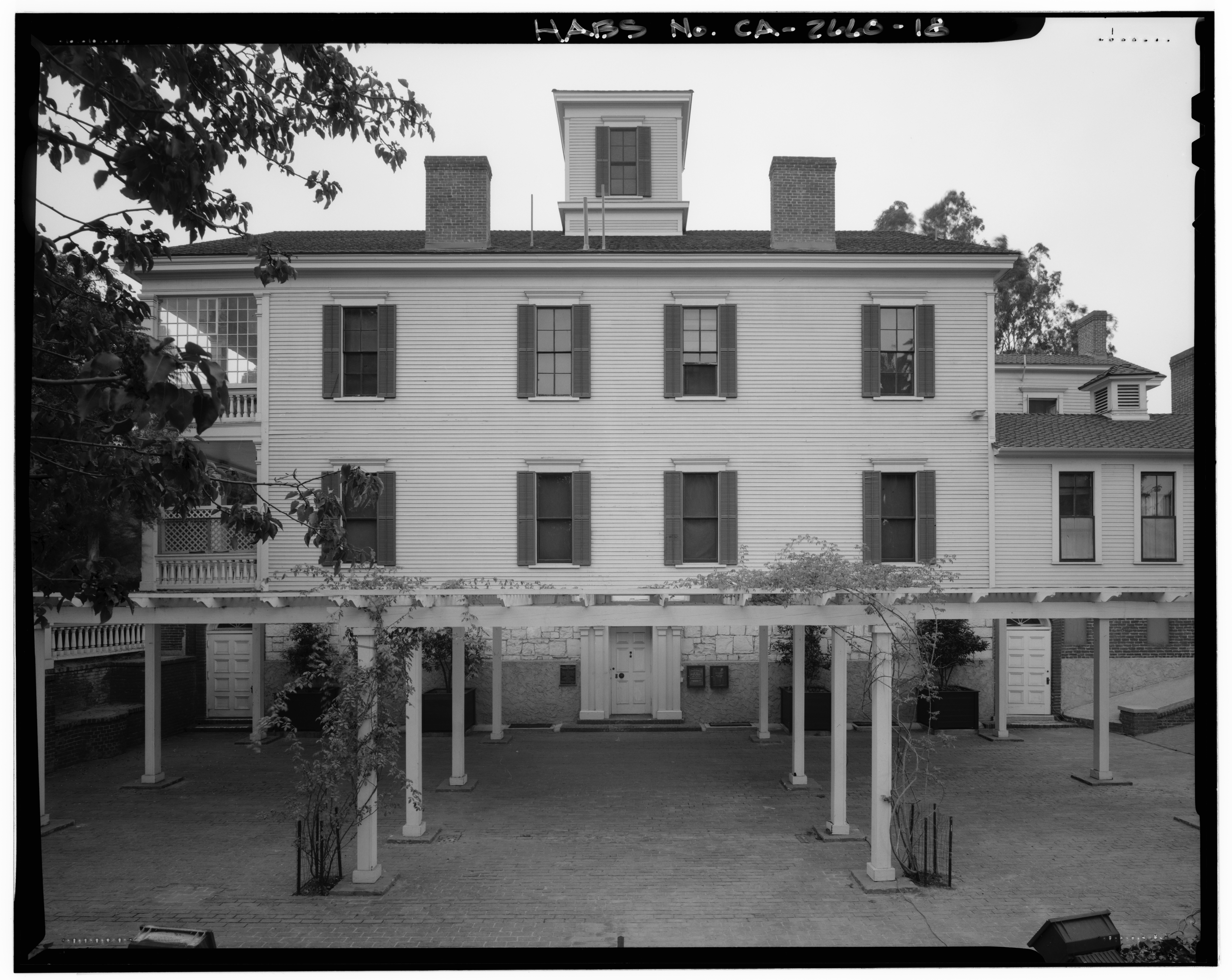
East elevation and patio

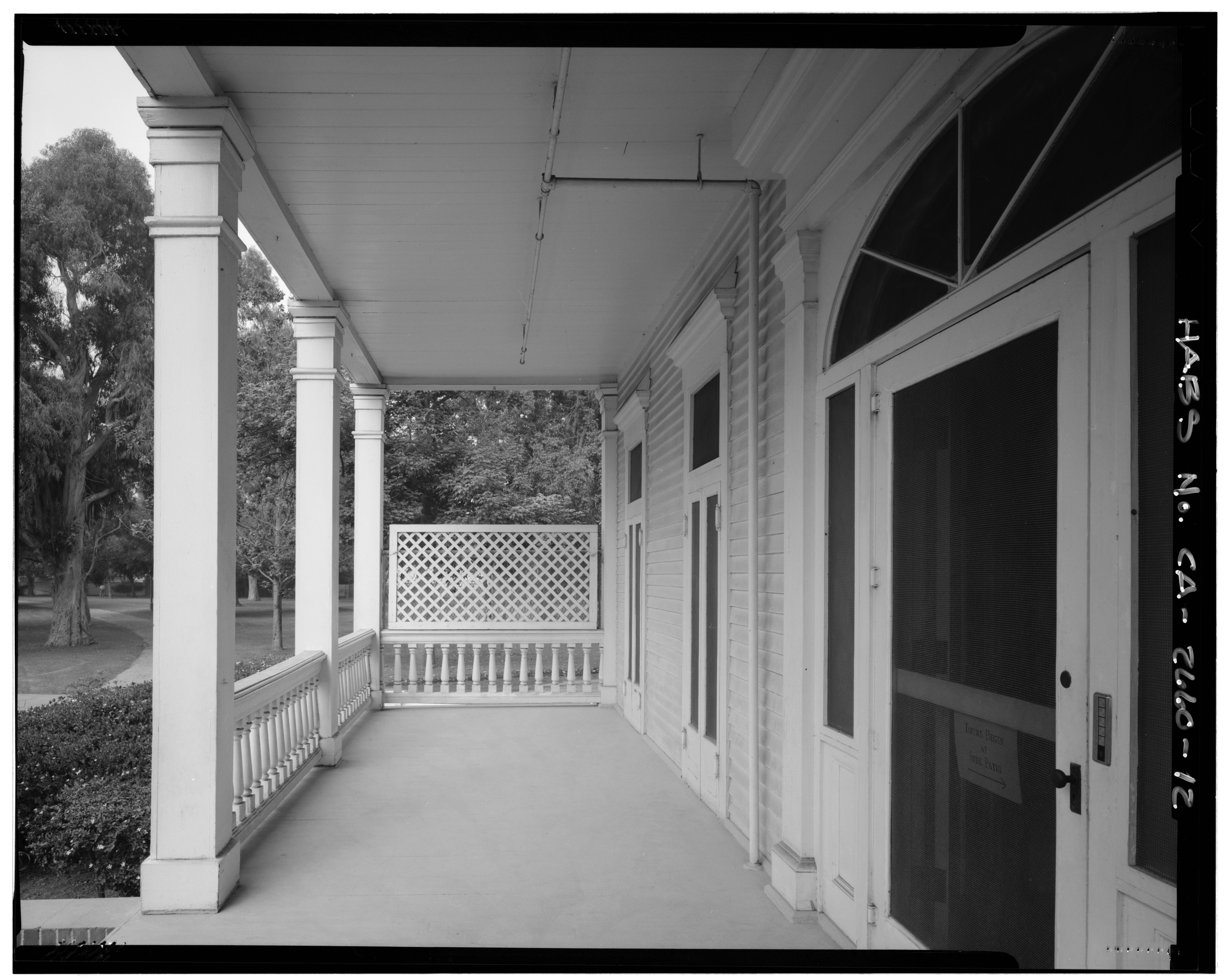
First floor front porch

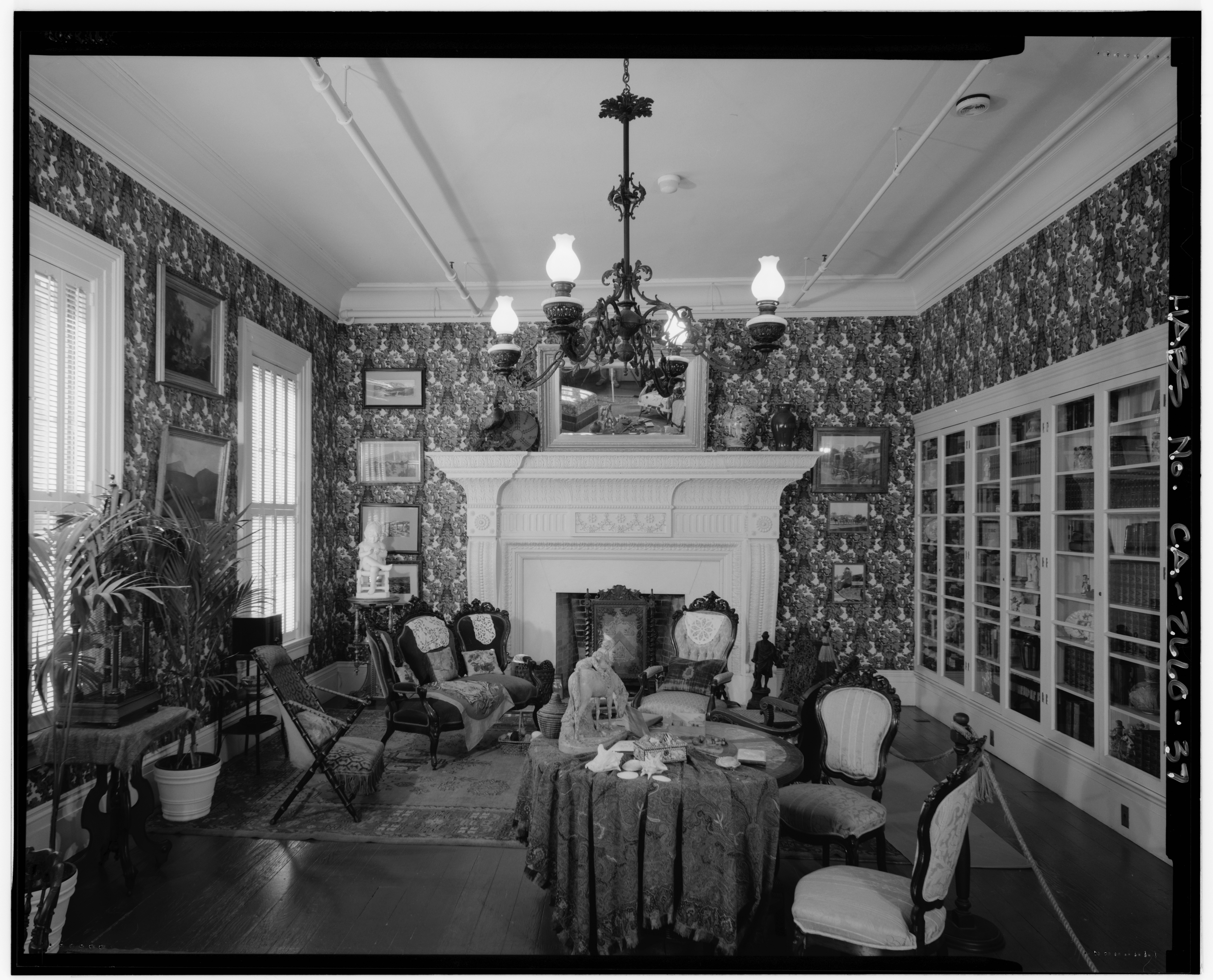
First floor family room

== See also ==
- List of Registered Historic Places in Los Angeles
- List of Los Angeles Historic-Cultural Monuments in the Harbor area
- Drum Barracks – Civil War barracks built on land donated by Banning, located down the street from Banning House
