= List of Los Angeles Historic-Cultural Monuments in the Harbor area =

This is a list of Los Angeles Historic-Cultural Monuments in the Harbor area of the city of Los Angeles, California, in the United States. There are more than 25 Los Angeles Historic-Cultural Monuments (LAHCM) in this area, and several additional sites have been designated as California Historical Landmarks (CHL) or listed on the National Register of Historic Places (NRHP). They are designated by the City's Cultural Heritage Commission.

== Overview of the Harbor Area's Historic-Cultural Monuments ==
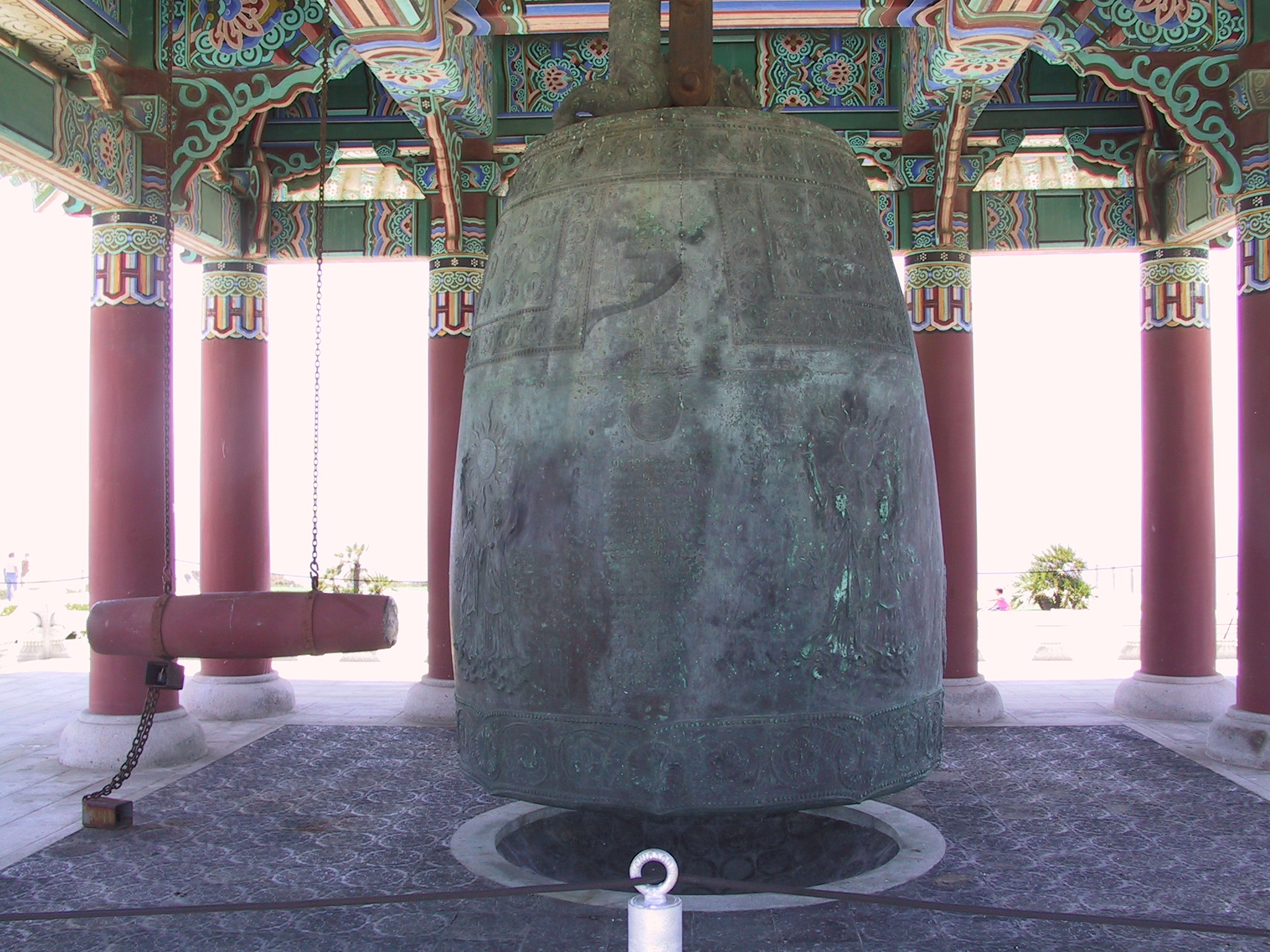
The Korean Bell of Friendship was a gift from the Republic of Korea in 1976.

The Harbor Area includes some of the city's most historic sites, several of which are also listed on the National Register of Historic Places. Two ships located in San Pedro have also received higher distinction as National Historic Landmarks. They are the Ralph Scott, a fireboat used for several decades by the Los Angeles Fire Department, and the Lane Victory, a World War II Victory ship.

The first sites in the Harbor area to be designated as HCM monuments were both built during the Civil War on land owned by Phinneas Banning. They are HCM #21 (the Civil War era Drum Barracks) and HCM #25 (Banning House where Phinneas Banning lived until his death).

The harbor has played an important role in the area's military history. San Pedro is the site of Fort MacArthur, which was established as a military reservation in 1888, and the harbor's historic sites include a Civil War-era barracks (Drum Barracks) and powder magazine (Powder Magazine (Camp Drum)), coastal artillery batteries built during World War I (Battery Osgood-Farley and Battery John Barlow and Saxton), and the flying bridge of a World War II heavy cruiser (the USS Los Angeles).

Many of the Harbor area's historical sites have been converted to museums that are open to the public, including Banning House, Drum Barracks, the Point Fermin Lighthouse, and the old San Pedro Municipal Ferry Building which now operates as the city-owned Los Angeles Maritime Museum. The hillside overlooking the Point Fermin Lighthouse also include impressive artillery bunkers used between World War I and World War II, and the Korean Bell of Friendship, donated by the Republic of Korea for U.S. Bicentennial in 1976. Though located a short distance outside the city limits, Lloyd Wright's Wayfarers Chapel is located a short distance north of Point Fermin.

The Los Angeles Conservancy offers bimonthly walking tours of the historic sites in downtown San Pedro, which includes access to the interiors of the area's historic structures.

== Historic-Cultural Monuments in the Harbor area ==
HCM #	Landmark name	Image	Date designated	Locality	Neighborhood	Description
21	Drum Barracks and Officers Quarters		Jun 7, 1963	1051-1055 Cary Dr. 33°47′04″N 118°15′27″W	Wilmington	Civil War Museum located in officers quarters built during Civil War
25	General Phineas Banning Residence		Oct 11, 1963	410 E. "M" St. 33°47′23″N 118°15′31″W	Wilmington	Greek Revival house built in 1863 by Phineas Banning; purchased by city in 1927 and operated as a museum in Banning Park
47	Saint John's Episcopal Church		Mar 15, 1967	1537 Neptune Ave. 33°47′38″N 118°16′12″W	Wilmington	Built in 1883, the oldest church building in the Harbor area that is still used for regular worship services; moved to its present site in 1943
53	Old St. Peter's Episcopal Church		Dec 6, 1967	Harbor View Memorial Park W. 24th St. & S. Grand Ave. 33°43′18″N 118°17′23″W	San Pedro	San Pedro's oldest church opened in 1884; moved to Harbor View Memorial Park c. 1960
146	Municipal Ferry Building (Maritime History Museum)	San Pedro Municipal Ferry Building, 2008	Sep 17, 1975	Main Channel (San Pedro Harbor); 33°44′19″N 118°16′43″W	San Pedro	Streamline Moderne building opened in 1941 as terminal for ferry to Terminal Island, now the Los Angeles Maritime Museum
147	James H. Dodson Residence		Sep 17, 1976	859 W. 13th St. 33°43′55″N 118°17′45″W	San Pedro	Victorian house built in 1881 by the Sepulveda family as a wedding present for their daughter Rudecinda and her husband, James Dodson; originally located at the corner of 7th and Beacon Streets
154	Fireboat No. 2 and Firehouse No. 112		May 5, 1976	Old Dock St. 33°44′28″N 118°16′44″W	San Pedro	Fireboat #2 (pictured) is more commonly known as the Ralph J. Scott; Firehouse 112 was its home base.
155	Memory Chapel		May 5, 1976	1146 N. Marine Ave. 33°47′10″N 118°15′50″W	Wilmington	Built in 1870, the oldest Protestant church in the Harbor area; also known as Calvary Presbyterian Church
171	Site of Timm's Landing (landscaped park of Fishermens Co-op)		Feb 16, 1977	Fish slip	San Pedro	Shipping center in mid-1800s; no original structures remain; at northwest end of fish slip, landscaped park in front of Fishermen's Co-op building, east of the harbor bel railroad tracks
186	Morgan House (Harbor Area YWCA)		Apr 19, 1978	437 W. 9th St.	San Pedro	American Craftsman style YWCA building designed by Julia Morgan, built in 1918
187	Korean Bell and Belfry of Friendship (Angel's Gate Park)		May 3, 1978	37th & Gaffey St. 33°42′35″N 118°17′37″W	San Pedro	Bell donated to city by Republic of Korea for U.S. Bicentennial in 1976, designed by Kim Se-jung and patterned after bell of King Songdok
188	USS Los Angeles Naval Monument (John S. Gibson Jr. Park)		May 3, 1978	550 S. Harbor Blvd. 33°44′22″N 118°16′46″W	San Pedro	Platform housing the heavy cruiser Los Angeles's mainmast, bow, anchors, bollards and anchor capstan cover, dedicated in 1977
213	S.S. Catalina (The Great White Steamship)		May 16, 1979	Formerly at Berth 96, L.A. Harbor; 33°44′58″N 118°16′23″W	San Pedro	Steamship that transported 25 million people to Santa Catalina Island from 1924 to 1975; foundered in Ensenada in Mexico, 1997; destroyed for scrap, 2009.
249	Powder Magazine (Camp Drum)		Aug 10, 1982	561 E. Opp St. 33°46′59″N 118°15′19″W	Wilmington	Camp Drum's powder magazine during Civil War, built in 1862; 20' x 20' brick and stone structure
251	Juarez Theater (Warner Brothers)		Aug 25, 1982	478 W. 6th St. 33°44′19″N 118°17′14″W	San Pedro	Art deco movie theater designed by B. Marcus Priteca, built in 1931; original murals and furnishings still there.
252	Harbor View House		Aug 25, 1982	921 Beacon St. 33°44′08″N 118°16′51″W	San Pedro	Five-story Spanish Colonial Revival structure dedicated in 1926 as a recreation center for servicemen
253	Muller House Museum		Sep 28, 1982	1542 S. Beacon St. 33°43′48″N 118°16′50″W	San Pedro	Colonial Revival house built in 1899 with leaded glass; moved to present location in 1985.
308	Wilmington Branch Library		Jun 27, 1986	309 W. Opp St. 33°46′57″N 118°15′56″W	Wilmington	Spanish Colonial style library built in 1927; designed by Sylvanus Marston, Garrett Van Pelt and Edgar Maybury.
342	Masonic Temple (Wilmington, California)		Jan 22, 1988	227 N. Avalon Blvd. 33°46′19″N 118°15′43″W	Wilmington	Renaissance Revival lodge hall; believed to be built in 1882 and moved to present location in 1912
414	Wilmington Cemetery		Jan 24, 1989	605 E. O St. 33°47′34″N 118°15′20″W	Wilmington	Cemetery built in 1857 on land donated by Phineas Banning, burial site for Civil War soldiers and members of the Banning and Narbonne families
505	First Baptist Church of San Pedro (Facade & Stained Glass Window)		May 22, 1990	555 W. 7th St. 33°44′16.16″N 118°17′16.81″W	San Pedro	Beaux Arts Classical church built in 1919 with Egyptian columns and fine stained glass windows; designed by Norman F. Marsh
509	Camphor Trees		Dec 18, 1990	1200–1268 Lakme Ave. 33°47′19″N 118°15′36″W	Wilmington	52 camphor trees planted south of Banning House when the Banning family sold the land for subdivision in 1930
514	Residence at 381–383 10th Street		Jan 22, 1991	383 10th St. 33°44′06″N 118°17′07″W	San Pedro	Colonial Revival house built in 1907 with three types of wood siding
515	Battery Osgood-Farley		Jan 22, 1991	3601 Gaffey St. 33°42′45″N 118°17′36″W	San Pedro	Concrete bunker built in 1919 and used for coastal artillery defense until 1944
557	Wilbur F. Wood House		Apr 21, 1992	4026 Bluff Place; 33°42′26″N 118°17′10″W	San Pedro	House built by father of modern tuna packing industry, founder of "Chicken of the Sea"
571	Cabrillo Beach Bathhouse		Dec 18, 1993	3720 Stephen White Dr. 33°42′35″N 118°17′01″W	San Pedro	Mediterranean style beachouse built in 1932
732	San Pedro Municipal Building		Oct 22, 2002	638 S. Beacon St. 33°44′17″N 118°16′48″W	San Pedro	Also known as "San Pedro City Hall", the seven-story Beaux Arts building was completed in 1928 and is the tallest building in San Pedro; includes an old jail, a wood-paneled courtroom, and a fire station converted into a museum
751	Redmen's Hall		Apr 29, 2003	543 Shepard St. 33°42′24″N 118°17′20″W	San Pedro	Craftsman-style lodge was originally a library when built in 1915; it later became the local chapter of the Improved Order of Red Men
814	The Danish Castle		Jul 8, 2005	324 W. 10th St. 33°44′07″N 118°17′02″W	San Pedro	House built in the 1880s by a Danish sea captain
914	Avalon Boulevard Mexican Fan Palm Trees		April 8, 2008	Avalon Blvd. between E. Lomita Blvd. and W. I St. 33°47′22.49″N 118°15′47.71″W	Wilmington	Planted for the 1932 Olympic Games, 218 Mexican Fan Palm trees.

== Non-HCM sites also recognized ==
The LAHCM sites listed above include many of the most important historic sites in the City of Los Angeles' port area. Some others within L.A. in the area have been listed on the National Register of Historic Places, including the SS Lane Victory, a U.S. National Historic Landmark. These are:

Code	Landmark name	Image	Selected date	Locality	Neighborhood	Description
2380	U.S. Post Office (San Pedro, California)			801–841 S. Beacon St. 33°44′11″N 118°16′50″W	San Pedro	Art Deco post office built in 1936 as a WPA project, with extensive use of marble, bronze and milk glass and WPA murals depicting postal and harbor history
2385	Point Fermin Lighthouse			805 Paseo Del Mar; 33°42′19″N 118°17′37″W	San Pedro	Built in 1874 out of California redwood, the lighthouse is preserved as a museum with its original Fresnel Lens
2709	Municipal Warehouse No. 1			2500 Signal St. 33°43′16″N 118°16′20″W	San Pedro	Six-story warehouse built in 1917 on the outermost point at the Port of Los Angeles; its roof has a commanding view of the harbor and has housed the Marine Exchange sind the 1920s
	Battleship USS Iowa			250 South Harbor Blvd. 33°44′30″N 118°16′39″W	San Pedro	The battleship of Presidents and only battleship located on the west coast.
	Los Angeles Harbor Light Station		1980-10-14	Los Angeles Harbor (San Pedro Breakwater); 33°42′23″N 118°14′53″W	San Pedro	Lighthouse firmly anchored to the concrete block and built of steel reinforced concrete; only lighthouse ever built to this design
	American Trona Corporation Building		1984-08-30	Pacific Ave. 33°43′3″N 118°17′10″W	San Pedro	Industrial building in San Pedro used to process and store salt potash; built ca. 1917
	Battery John Barlow and Saxton		1982-05-04	Fort MacArthur; 33°42′58″N 118°17′41″W	San Pedro	United States coastal defense gun emplacement; part of Fort MacArthur; added to register in 1982
	500 Varas Square-Government Reserve		1986-03-12		San Pedro	Land near the Port of Los Angeles reserved to the federal government in the 19th Century; later became Fort MacArthur.
	SS Lane Victory	SS Lane Victory docked under Vincent Thomas Bridge Port of Los Angeles	1990-12-14	Berth 46, Port of San Pedro; 33°42′52″N 118°16′29″W	San Pedro	Second World War Victory ship; preserved as a museum ship

There are at least 15 other historic sites in the port area of Long Beach, California, including the RMS Queen Mary. For these, see National Register of Historic Places listings in Los Angeles County, California.

== See also ==
- Bibliography of Los Angeles
- Outline of the history of Los Angeles
- Bibliography of California history

=== Lists of L.A. Historic-Cultural Monuments ===
- Historic-Cultural Monuments in Downtown Los Angeles
- Historic-Cultural Monuments on the East and Northeast Sides
- Historic-Cultural Monuments in Hollywood
- Historic-Cultural Monuments in the San Fernando Valley
- Historic-Cultural Monuments in Silver Lake, Angelino Heights, and Echo Park
- Historic-Cultural Monuments in South Los Angeles
- Historic-Cultural Monuments on the Westside
- Historic-Cultural Monuments in the Wilshire and Westlake areas

=== Other ===
- City of Los Angeles' Historic Preservation Overlay Zones
- National Register of Historic Places listings in Los Angeles
- National Register of Historic Places listings in Los Angeles County
- List of California Historical Landmarks
- List of City of Long Beach historic landmarks
