= Korean Bell of Friendship =

Public art in Los Angeles, United States

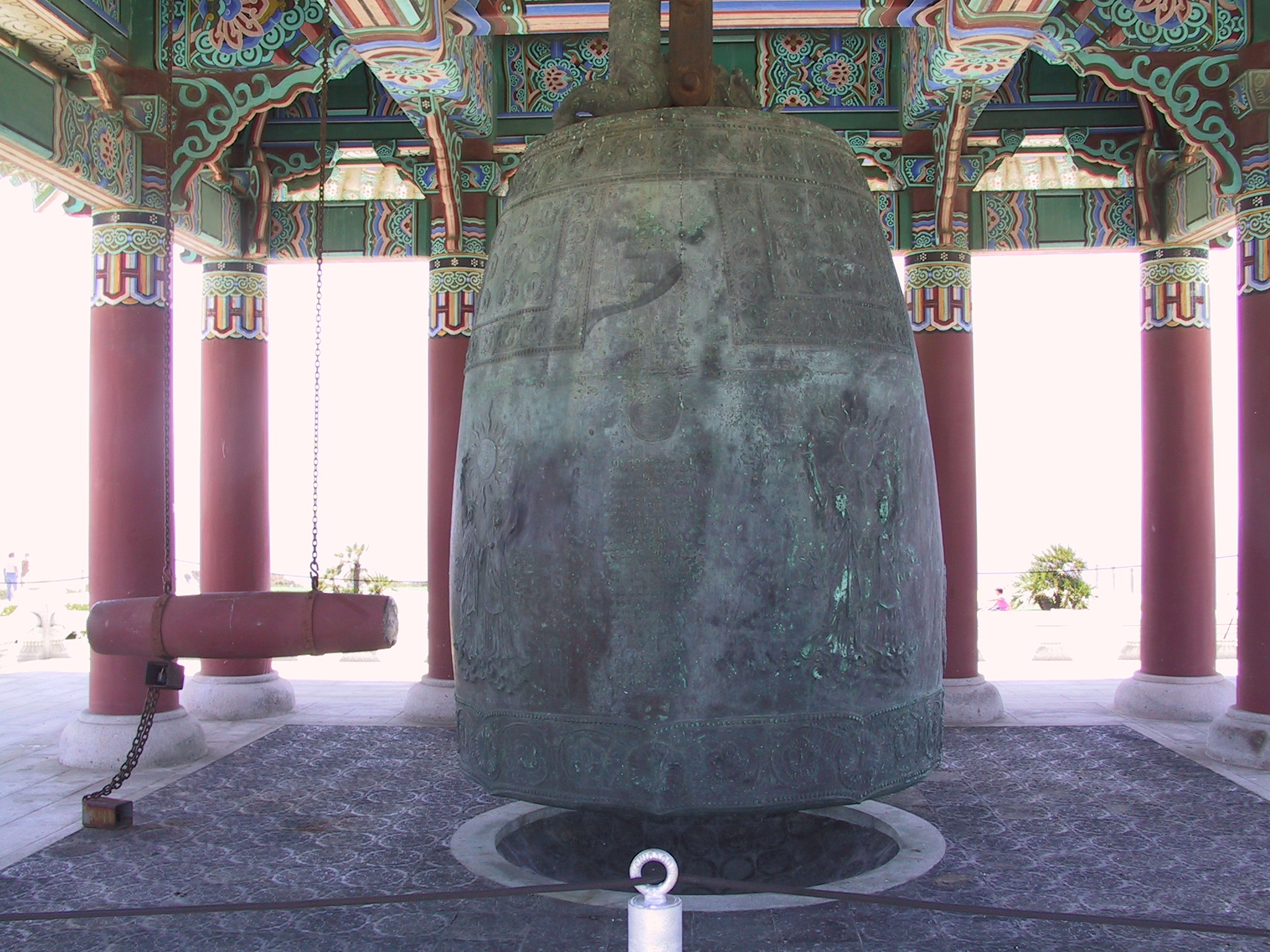
- Designation

Los Angeles Historic-Cultural Monument
- Designated: May 3, 1978
- Reference no.: 187
- Location: Los Angeles, California; 33°42′34.84″N 118°17′37.73″W

Korean name
- Hangul: 우정의 종
- Hanja: 友情의 鐘
- RR: Ujeongui jong
- MR: Ujŏngŭi chong

The Korean Bell of Friendship (more commonly called Korean Friendship Bell) is a massive bronze bell housed in a stone pavilion located in Angel's Gate Park, situated in the San Pedro neighborhood of Los Angeles, California. Positioned at the intersection of Gaffey and 37th Streets, this section of the park is also referred to as the "Korean–American Peace Park" and occupies a portion of the former Upper Reservation of Fort MacArthur.

== Description ==
The Korean Friendship Bell is modeled after the Divine Bell of King Seongdeok the Great of Silla (also known as the Emille Bell), The Emille Bell was cast in 771 for Bongdeok Temple and is currently housed at the National Museum of Gyeongju. Designated as National Treasure of Korea number 29 in 1962, the Emille Bell holds historical significance. It is noteworthy that the Emille Bell is the largest bell ever cast in Korean history, and both the Emille Bell and the Korean Friendship Bell are among the largest bells in the world.

The bell is made of over seventeen tons of copper and tin, with gold, nickel, lead, and phosphorus added to the alloy for tone quality. It has a circumference of 23.8 ft (7.25 m), diameter of 7 1/2 ft (2.3 m), average thickness of 8 in (200 mm), and a height of 12 ft (3.63 m). The exterior surface is richly decorated in relief, featuring four pairs of figures. Each pair includes a "Goddess of Liberty" (bearing some resemblance to the Statue of Liberty) and a Seonnyeo, or Korean spirit figure, holding the South Korean national symbol: a Taegeuk symbol, a branch of rose of Sharon, a branch of laurel, and a dove.

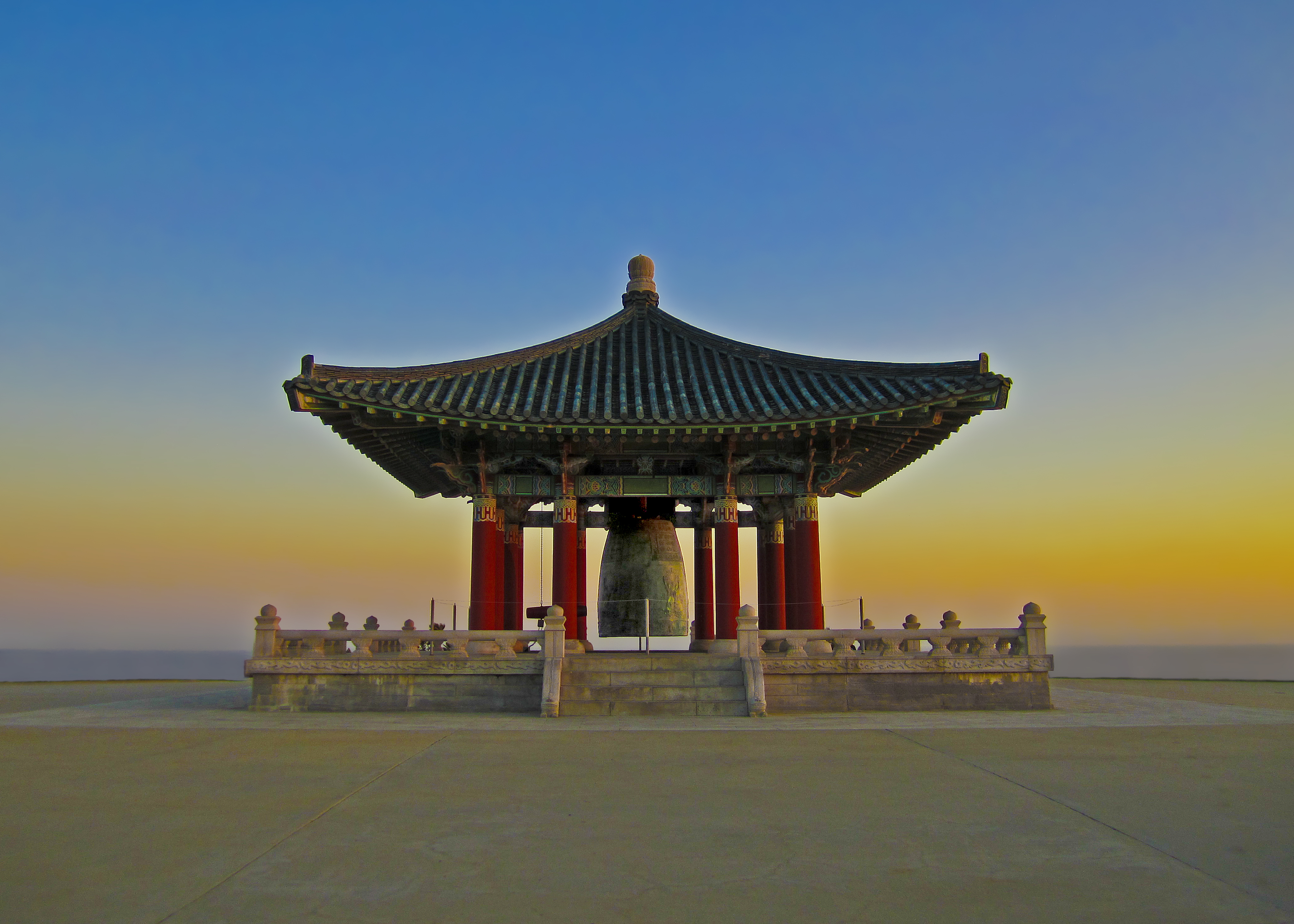
The "Belfry of Friendship" (우정의 종각; Ujeongui jonggak), which houses the bell

== History ==
The bell was presented by the South Korean government to the United States to celebrate the United States Bicentennial and to symbolize friendship between the two countries. The effort was coordinated by Philip Ahn, a Korean American actor. It was dedicated on October 3, 1976, and declared Los Angeles Historic-Cultural Monument No. 187 on May 3, 1978.

The bell is struck 13 times on the first Saturday of each month at 11:30 AM.

Beginning in 2010, the bell has been ceremonially struck five times a year:

1. Dec 31: New Year's Eve
2. Jan 13: Korean American Day
3. Jul 4: Fourth of July
4. Aug 15: Korean Liberation Day
5. Sep 17: Constitution Day

It was also rung on September 11, 2002, to commemorate the first anniversary of the September 11, 2001, terrorist attacks. The bell does not have a clapper; instead, it is sounded by striking it with a large wooden log.

The pavilion that houses the bell, known as the Belfry of Friendship, was built by South Korean craftsmen over a period of ten months. Its design is traditional. It is axially symmetric, consisting of a hipped (a.k.a. "pyramidal") roof supported by twelve columns representing the Korean zodiac, each column guarded by a carved animal. The color patterning along the bell's pavilion is known in Korean as dancheong.

In 2013, the bell received a full restoration to remove accumulated rust and graffiti tagging, and access to the bell and the pavilion was restricted from September through December. The City of Los Angeles rededicated the Bell during a public ceremony on January 10, 2014, after the Korean Ministry of Culture, Sports and Tourism contributed more than US$300,000 (equivalent to $408,000 in 2025) to hire bell masters for the restoration.

Access to the Bell was closed for more than a year following the start of the COVID-19 pandemic in Los Angeles, reopening in May 2021.

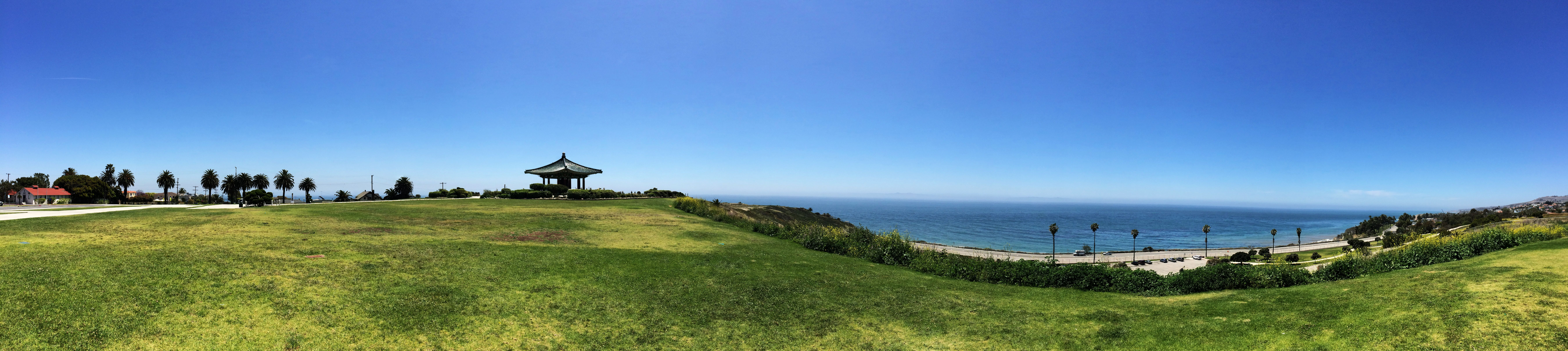
Panorama including the belfry

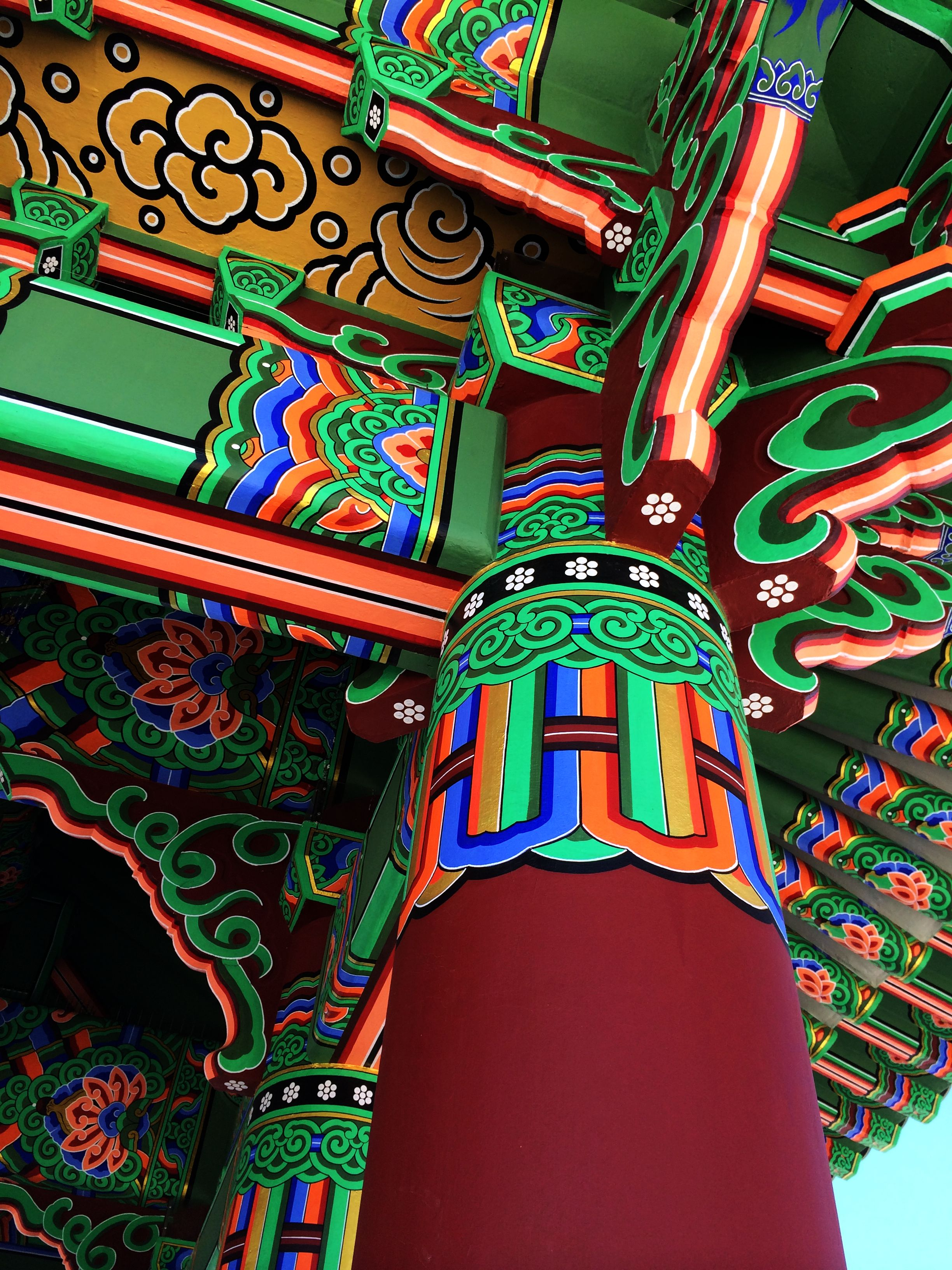
Dancheong decoration

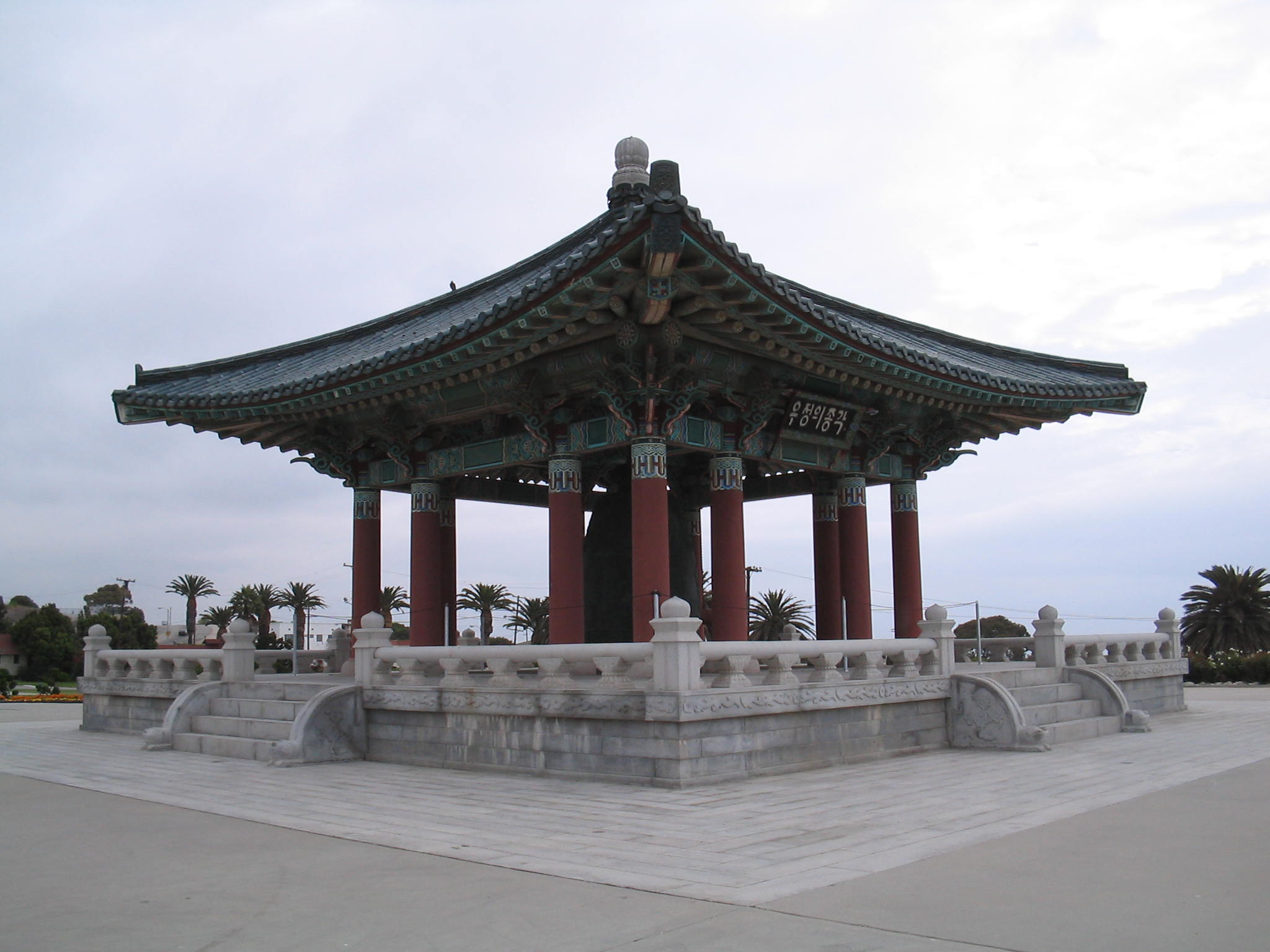
Belfry and plaza

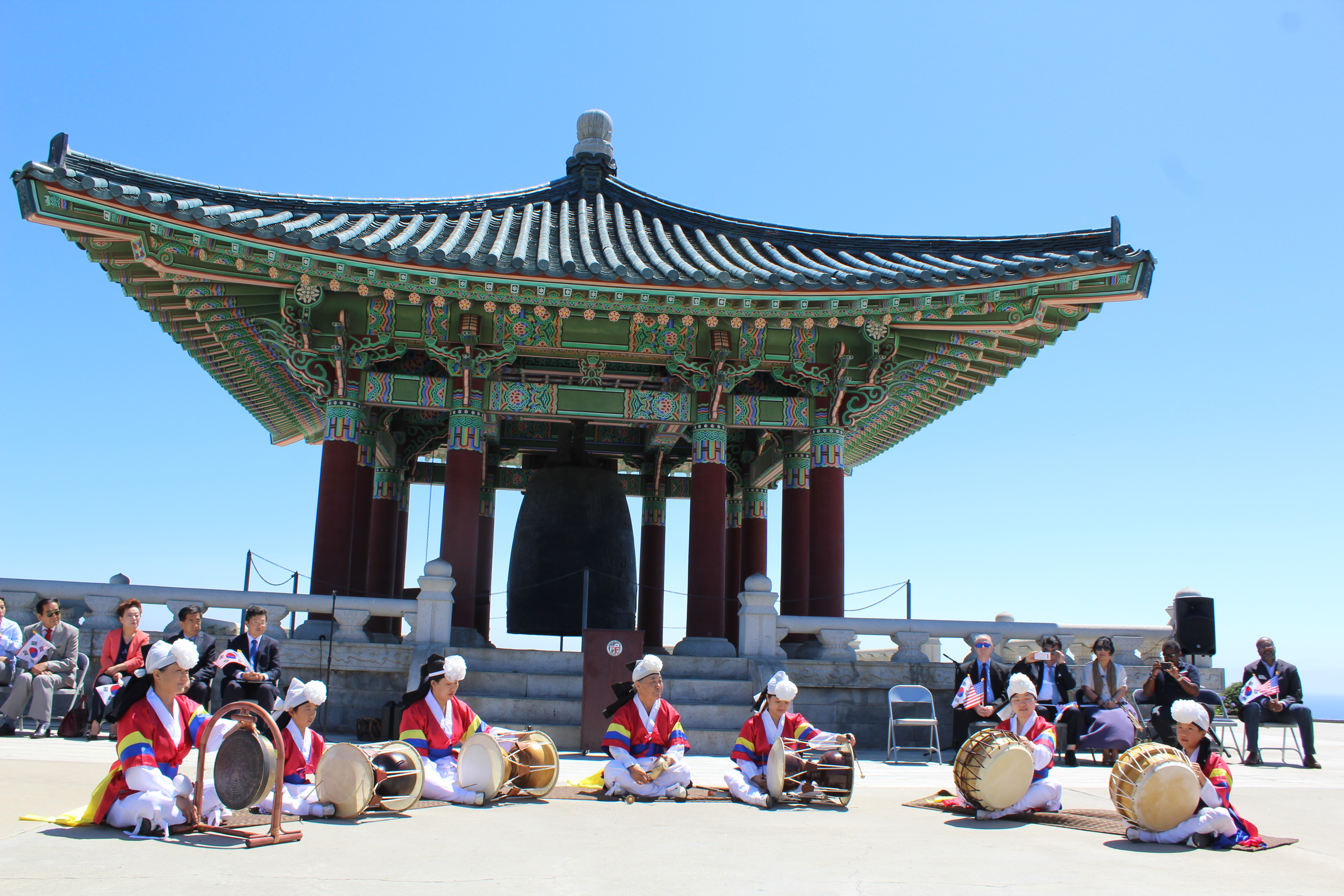
Korean Liberation Day ceremonies (2019)

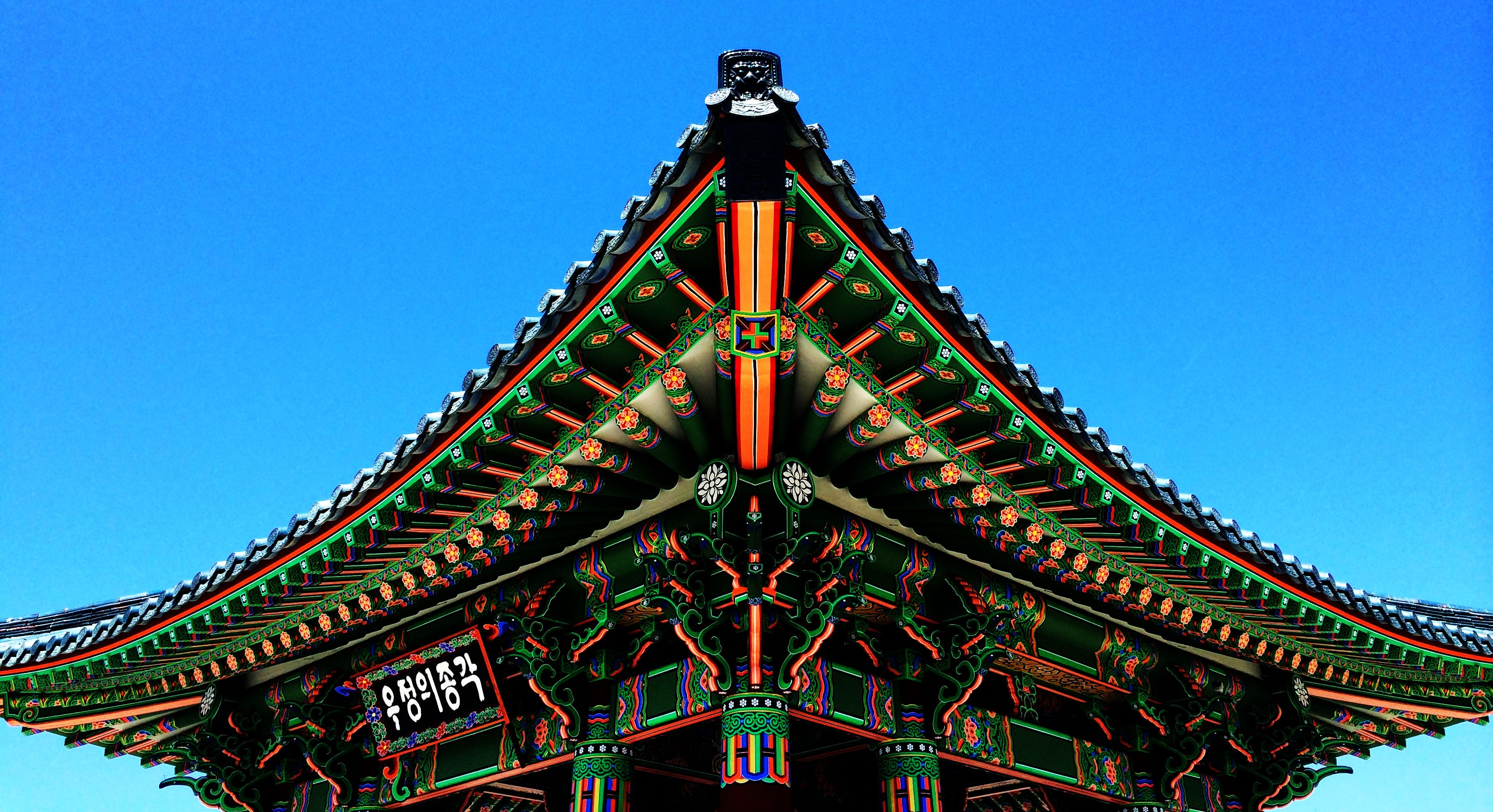
Roof of belfry

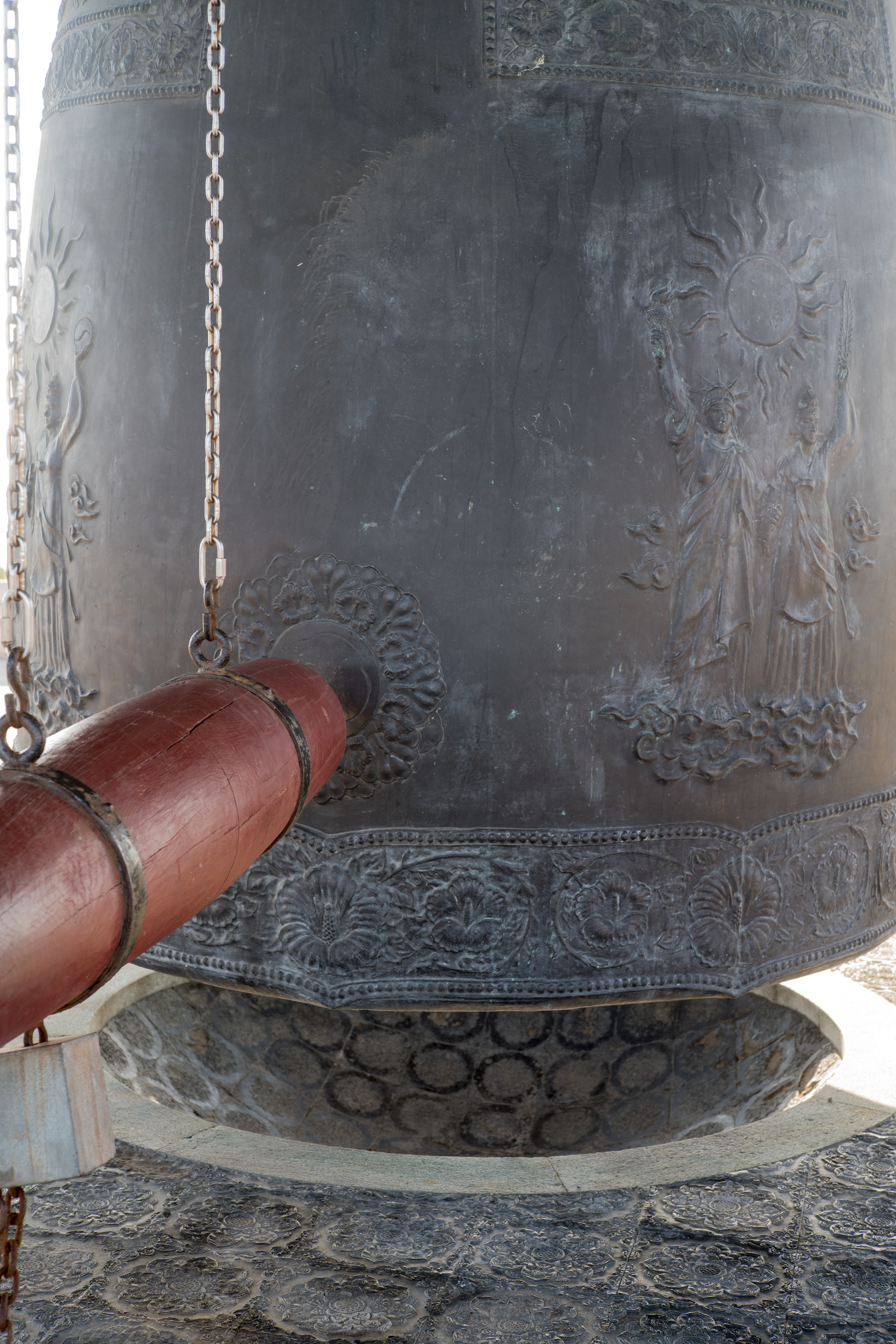
Bell and striker

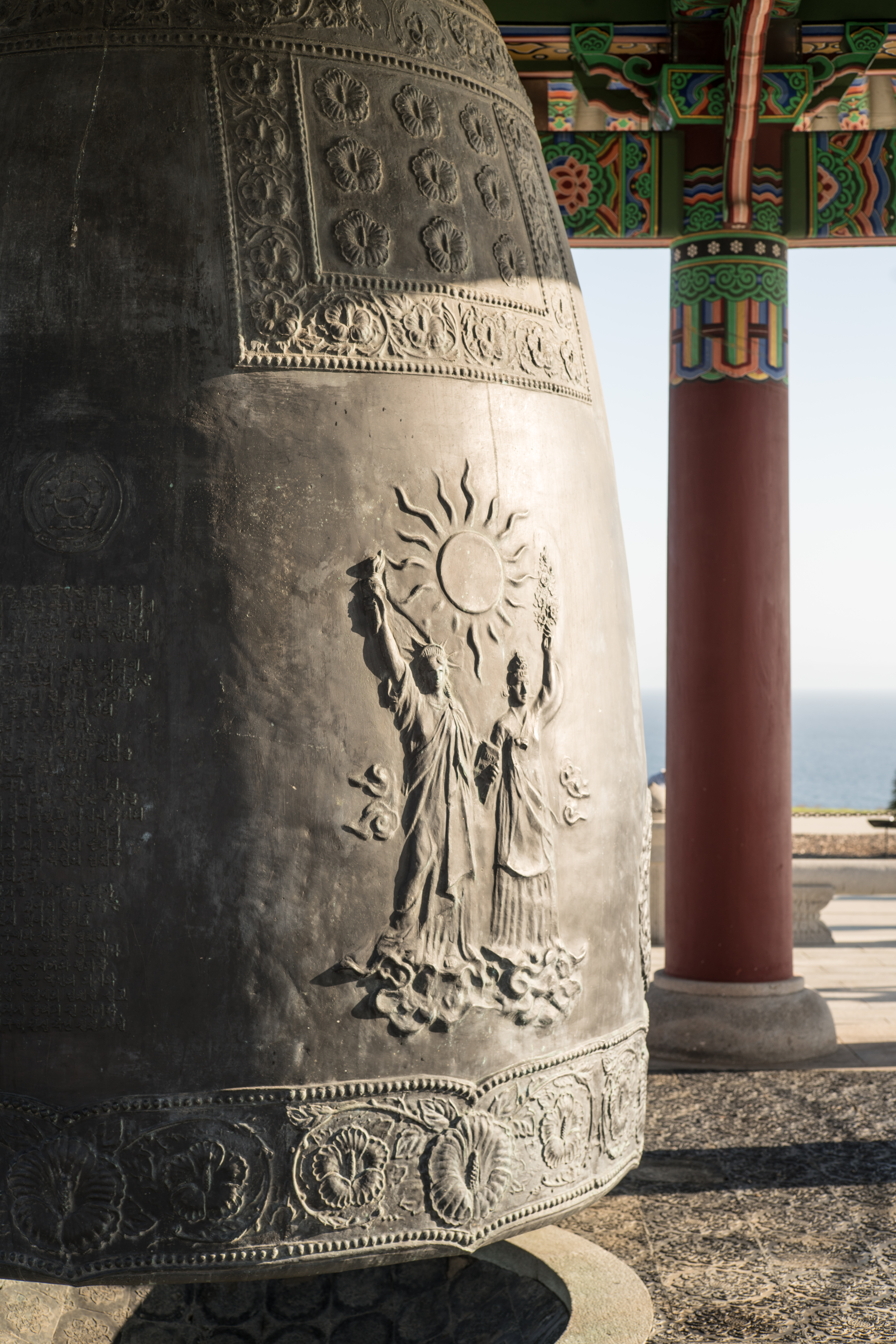
Relief detail

== Popular culture ==
The Korean Friendship Bell is featured in films, television shows, and video games including:

- (1994) It's Pat, as the location of Pat and Chris' wedding.
- (1995) The Usual Suspects, as the location of the jewel exchange during the opening scenes.
- (2002) Bollywood movie Kaante shows one of the characters (Andy) walking with his kid in the park, with the belfry in background.
- (1998) Disney Channel movie Brink! the downhill street skating course is located on the street next to the bell. The bell can be seen in the background of scenes set at the downhill course.
- (1996) American TV series Profiler features the bell and its pavilion in the season 1 episode "Unholy Alliance".
- (2013) A similar pavilion is included in the "Little Seoul" area of Los Santos, a fictional recreation of Los Angeles for the game Grand Theft Auto V.
- (2015) Lana Del Rey used this location to film the music video for the song "Music to Watch Boys To" as has the South Korean rapper Zico.
- (1994) VR Troopers portrays the bell as the place where Ryan Steele usually goes to reflect where he was trained by his father to do martial arts when he was a little kid. It was also filmed during Ryan's monologues in the beginning and end of each episode.

== See also ==
- History of the Korean Americans in Los Angeles
- Koreatown, Los Angeles
- List of Los Angeles Historic-Cultural Monuments in the Harbor area
