= Powder Magazine (Camp Drum) =

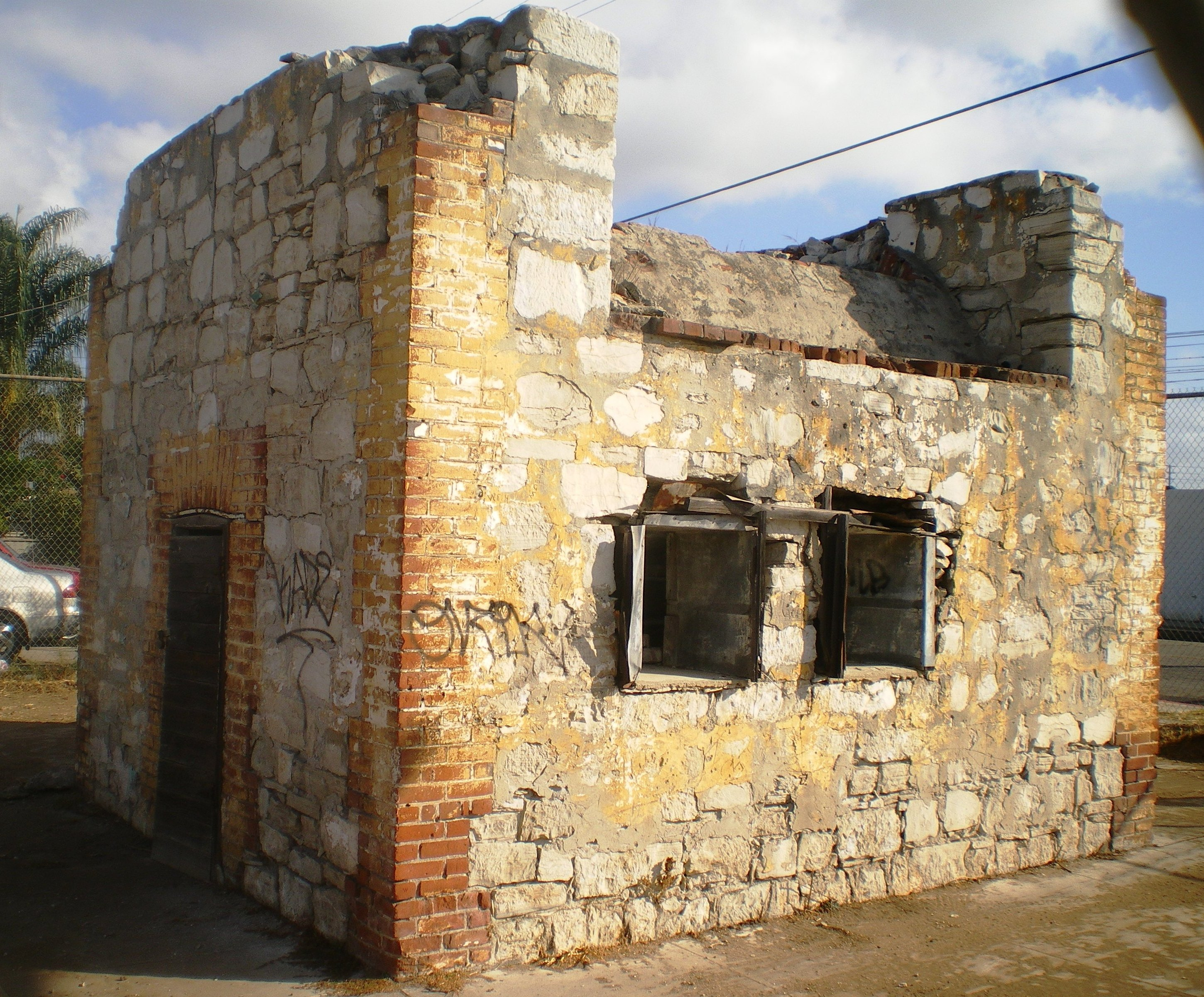
- Powder Magazine (Camp Drum)

- Location within the Los Angeles metropolitan area
- Location: 561 E. Opp St., Wilmington, Los Angeles, California

History
- Built: 1862

Site notes
- Governing body: private

Los Angeles Historic-Cultural Monument
- Designated: August 10, 1982
- Reference no.: 249

The Powder Magazine from Camp Drum is a Los Angeles Historic-Cultural Monument located in the Wilmington section of Los Angeles, California, near the Port of Los Angeles. Built in 1862, the Powder Magazine is a 20-by-20-foot (6.1 m × 6.1 m) brick and stone structure that was used to store gunpowder during the Civil War. It was originally part of Camp Drum, a facility built upon the outbreak of the American Civil War to address concerns about the loyalty and security of the Los Angeles area. Many of the area's residents were recent arrivals from the Southern states, and southerner John C. Breckinridge received twice as many local votes as Abraham Lincoln in the 1860 Presidential election. Phineas Banning, the founder of Wilmington (then known as New San Pedro), wrote to President Lincoln advising that the Union would lose California unless some provision was made to quell pro-Confederacy sentiment. Camp Drum was built between 1862 and 1863 and was the home base for the California Column, commanded by Colonel James Henry Carleton. Between 2,000 and 7,000 soldiers were stationed at Camp Drum, and Wilmington became a thriving community with a population greater than Los Angeles during the war. The Powder Magazine is one of only two surviving structures from Camp Drum, the other being the Drum Barracks, which is now operated as a Civil War museum by the City of Los Angeles. The Powder Magazine has been used for various private uses over the years, at one point having another structure built around it. When the larger structure was torn down, the Powder Magazine was re-discovered. In order to save it from demolition, it was declared a Historic-Cultural Monument (HCM #249) in August 1982. For more than two decades, it has sat on a vacant, fenced-off lot two blocks south of the Drum Barracks.

== See also ==
- List of Los Angeles Historic-Cultural Monuments in the Harbor area
