= Old St. Peter's Episcopal Church =

Coordinates: 33.722501°N 118.290187°W

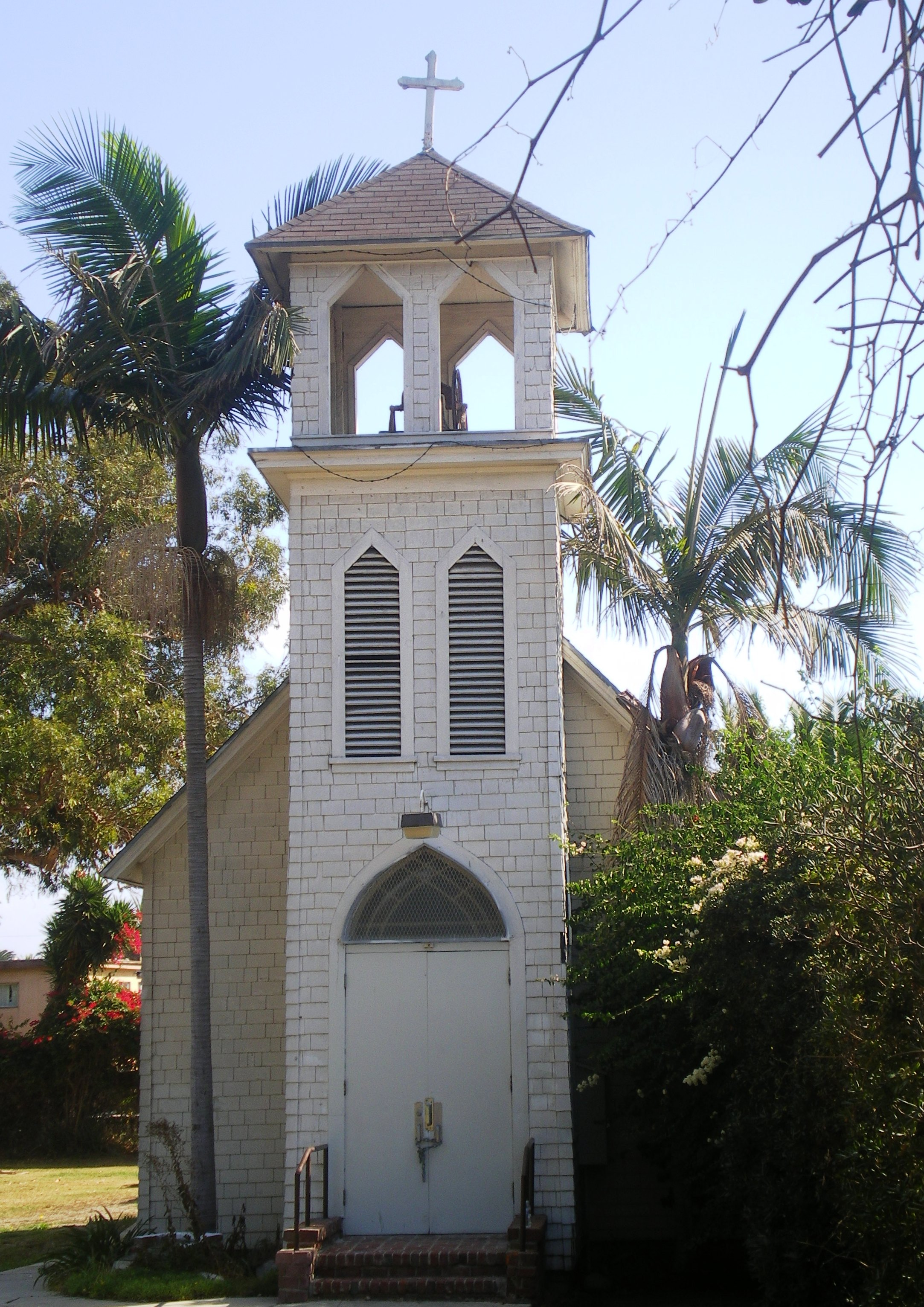
- Old St. Peter’s Episcopal Church

- Location within the Los Angeles metropolitan area
- Location: Harbor View Memorial Park (W. 24th St. & S. Grand Ave.), San Pedro, Los Angeles, California

History
- Built: 1883

Site notes
- Architectural style: Carpenter Gothic—Victorian
- Governing body: private

Los Angeles Historic-Cultural Monument
- Designated: December 6, 1967
- Reference no.: 53

Old St. Peter's Episcopal Church is a Los Angeles Historic-Cultural Monument located in the San Pedro section of Los Angeles, California, near the Port of Los Angeles. Built in 1883 in the Carpenter Gothic Victorian architecture style, it is San Pedro's oldest church.

== History ==
Using the same hand tools that were used to build ships, local residents built St. Peter's in 1883. The first service was held in April 1884 at the original location on Beacon Street, between 2nd and 3rd Street, on what was then Nob Hill. The church was designed in the Carpenter Gothic style of Victorian architecture, and measured only 21 feet by 60 feet. It has 110 hand-hewn pews, plain white walls, and a lectern supported by an angel carved out of redwood. The furnishings and paneling were made of redwood brought from Northern California on sailing vessels. In a profile of the church published in 1968, the Los Angeles Times described the old church as looking "like a dollhouse," but "with the rough-hewn charm of a 19th century ship."

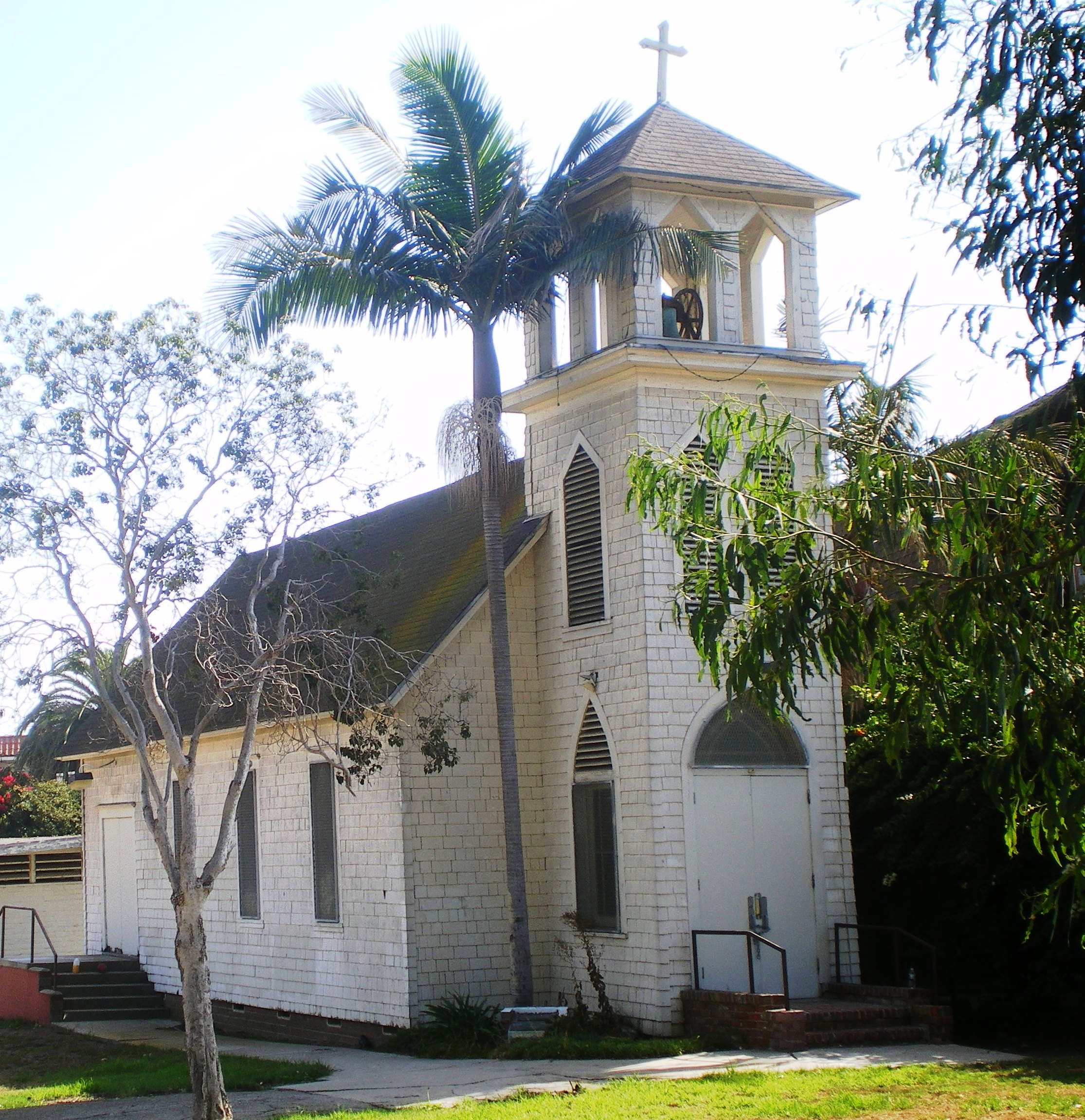
Old St. Peter's

Until approximately 1900, the church was used for both Catholic and Protestant services. Its steeple was lighted at night with a lantern, and from its location on Nob Hill, it served as a beacon for ships approaching the port. In 1904, St. Peter's was moved to Tenth and Mesa Streets in the Vinegar Hill section of San Pedro. The steeple fell off in the move to Vinegar Hill and was replaced with a belfry the still exists.

== Vacant ==
By 1953, the congregation had outgrown the small church, which had room for only 100 parishioners. A new St. Peter's was built, and the old church was left vacant and in danger of demolition. A group of local residents persuaded the city to accept and maintain the church, provided the group could raise $5,000 to move it to Harbor View Memorial Park. The fundraising effort succeeded, and St. Peter's was moved to its present location in September 1956. The church was deconsecrated and rededicated as a memorial chapel, which is open for special occasions, including weddings and music recitals.

In October 2008, there are plans to move the church from Harbor View Cemetery in the San Pedro neighborhood of Los Angeles, to Green Hills Memorial Park, in the city of Rancho Palos Verdes, California. Since the last information on this church was posted it has been moved once again and has been restored, including the steeple. It now stands on the grounds of Green Hills Memorial Park in Rancho Palos Verdes, California.

== See also ==
- List of Los Angeles Historic-Cultural Monuments in the Harbor area
