= Timm's Point and Landing =

Historical landmark in Los Angeles

Timms' Point and Landing
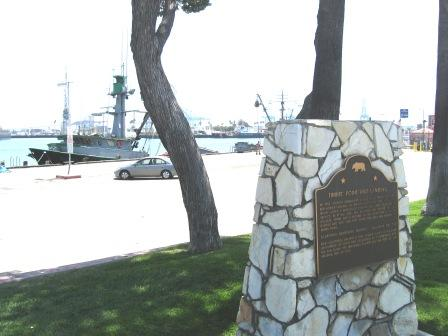
- June 2008

- Location within the Los Angeles metropolitan area
- 33°43′42″N 118°16′31″W
- Location: Sampson Way at Southern Pacific Slip; San Pedro, Los Angeles, California

California Historical Landmark
- Official name: Timm's Point and Landing
- Reference no.: 384

Los Angeles Historic-Cultural Monument
- Official name: Site of Timm's Landing
- Designated: February 16, 1977
- Reference no.: 171

Timms' Point and Landing is a California Historical Landmark at Los Angeles harbor in the San Pedro neighborhood of Los Angeles. It is a Los Angeles Historic-Cultural Monument, listed in 1977 as Site of Timm's Landing.

The area was a shipping center in mid-19th century. No original structures remain. It is located at northwest end of fish slip and includes a landscaped park in front of Fishermen's Co-op building, east of the harbor bel railroad tracks

== Marker ==
The California State marker on the site reads:"

- NO. 384 TIMMS' POINT AND LANDING - In 1852 German immigrant Augustus W. Timms obtained Sepúlveda's Landing on the mudflats near here. He built a wharf, added a warehouse, corral and other facilities to service shipping and the running of stages to Los Angeles. Timms was a pioneer in the development of the harbor and for over fifty years this area was known as Timms Point.

== See also ==
- List of Los Angeles Historic-Cultural Monuments in the Harbor area
- California Historical Landmarks in Los Angeles County
