= Saint John's Episcopal Church (Wilmington, California) =

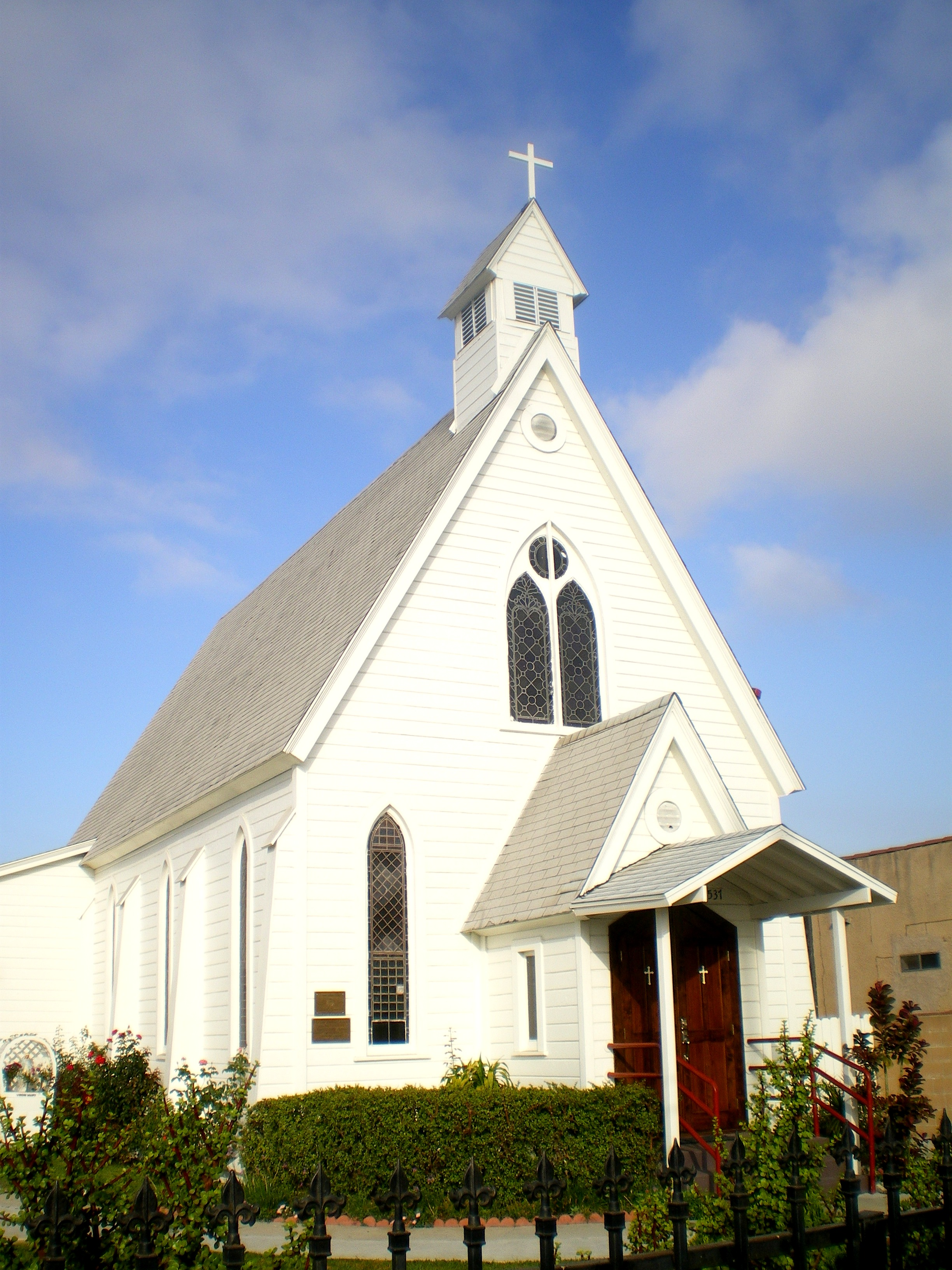
- Saint John’s Episcopal Church

- Location within the Los Angeles metropolitan area
- 33.79408°N 118.27026°W
- Location: 1537 Neptune Ave., Wilmington, Los Angeles, California

History
- Built: 1883

Site notes
- Governing body: private

Los Angeles Historic-Cultural Monument
- Designated: March 15, 1967
- Reference no.: 47

Saint John's Episcopal Church is a Los Angeles Historic-Cultural Monument located in the Wilmington section of Los Angeles, California, near the Port of Los Angeles. Built in 1883, it is the oldest church building in the harbor area that is still used for regular worship services. It was moved to its present site in 1943.

== See also ==
- List of Los Angeles Historic-Cultural Monuments in the Harbor area
