= Memory Chapel =

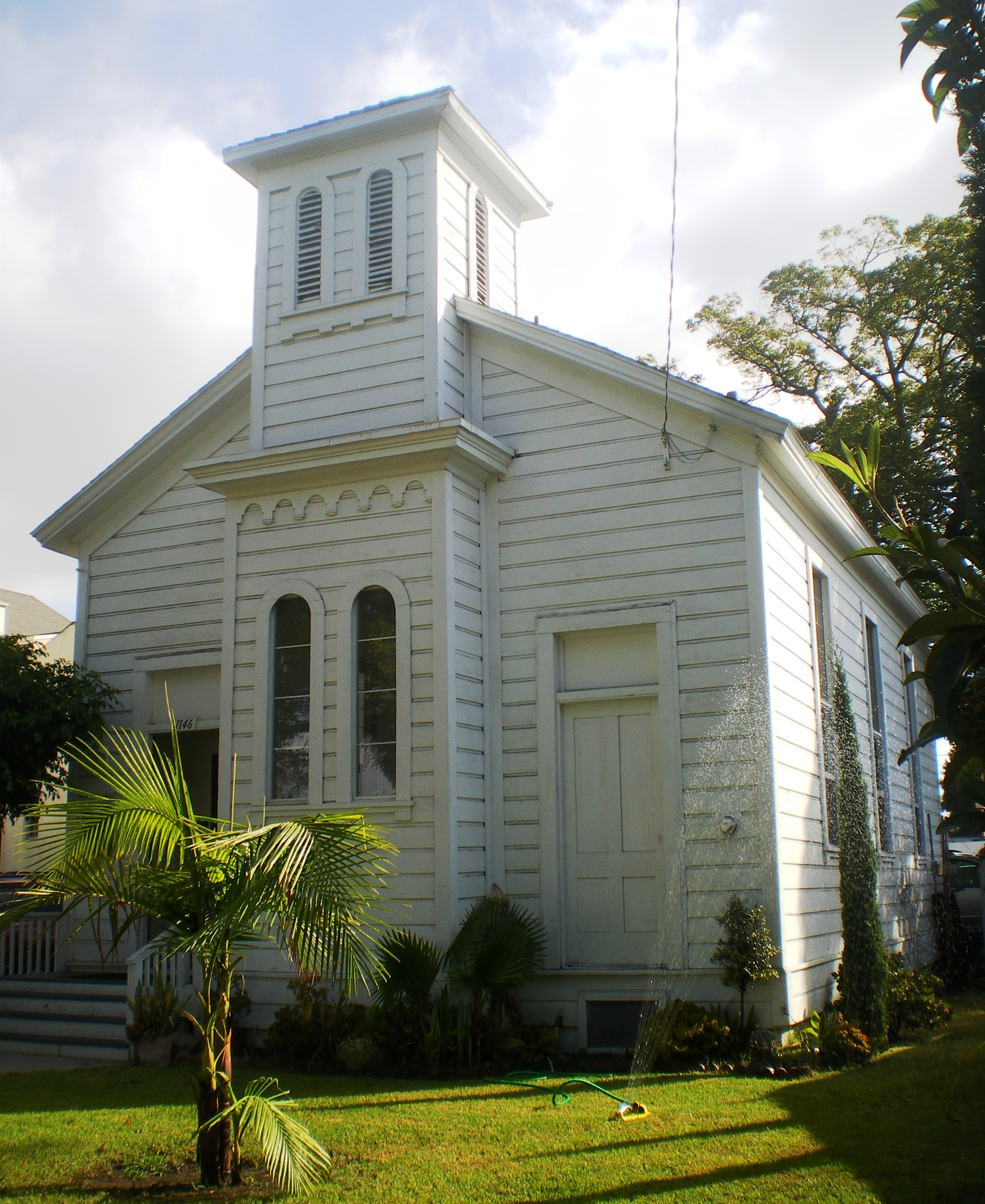
- Memory Chapel

- Location within the Los Angeles metropolitan area
- 33.786091°N 118.263955°W
- Location: 1146 N. Marine Ave., Wilmington, Los Angeles, California

History
- Built: 1870

Site notes
- Architectural style: Carpenter Gothic
- Governing body: private

Los Angeles Historic-Cultural Monument
- Designated: May 5, 1976
- Reference no.: 155

Memory Chapel is a Los Angeles Historic-Cultural Monument (HCM #155) located in the Wilmington section of Los Angeles, California, near the Port of Los Angeles. Built in 1870 in the Carpenter Gothic Victorian architecture style, it is the oldest Protestant church in the Harbor area. Originally located at "F" Street and Marine Avenue, it was moved to its present location in 1939. In 1946, the chapel was designated as a historical landmark under auspices of the Wilmington Parlor No. 278, Native Daughters of the Golden West.

The chapel is used now by a Philippine church, with Sunday services in the Tagalog language. The original pews dating to 1870 are still in use at the chapel. English services are held in the adjacent Calvary Presbyterian Church—which replaced the Memory Chapel.

== See also ==
- List of Los Angeles Historic-Cultural Monuments in the Harbor area
