= Fort MacArthur =

Former US Army installation in Los Angeles, California

- 500 Varas Square – Government Reserve (Fort MacArthur) (Battery Osgood-Farley)
- U.S. National Register of Historic Places
- U.S. Historic district
- Los Angeles Historic-Cultural Monument
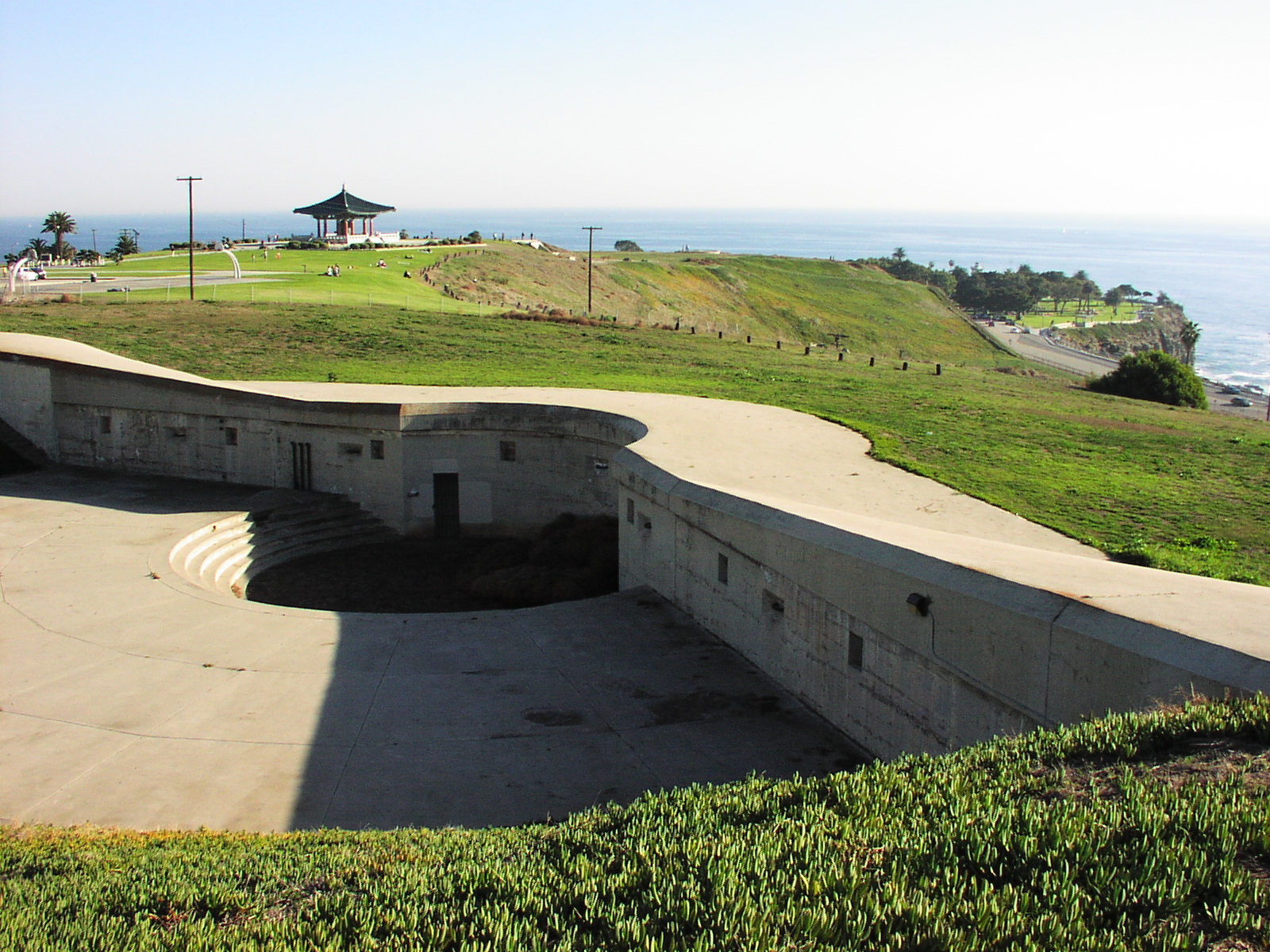
- Battery Farley, with the Korean Bell of Friendship in the background

- Location within the Los Angeles metropolitan area Location within California Location within the United States
- Nearest city: San Pedro, Los Angeles, California
- Coordinates: 33°42′43″N 118°17′46″W
- Built: 1914
- Architect: US Army, Quartermaster General
- Architectural style: Bungalow/Craftsman, Mission/Spanish Revival
- NRHP reference No.: 86000326
- LAHCM No.: 515

Significant dates
- Added to NRHP: March 12, 1986
- Designated LAHCM: January 22, 1991

Fort MacArthur is a former United States Army installation in San Pedro, Los Angeles, California (now the port community of Los Angeles). A small section remains in military use by the United States Air Force as a housing and administrative annex of Los Angeles Air Force Base. The fort is named after Lieutenant General Arthur MacArthur. His son, Douglas MacArthur, would later command American forces in the Pacific during World War II.

== History ==
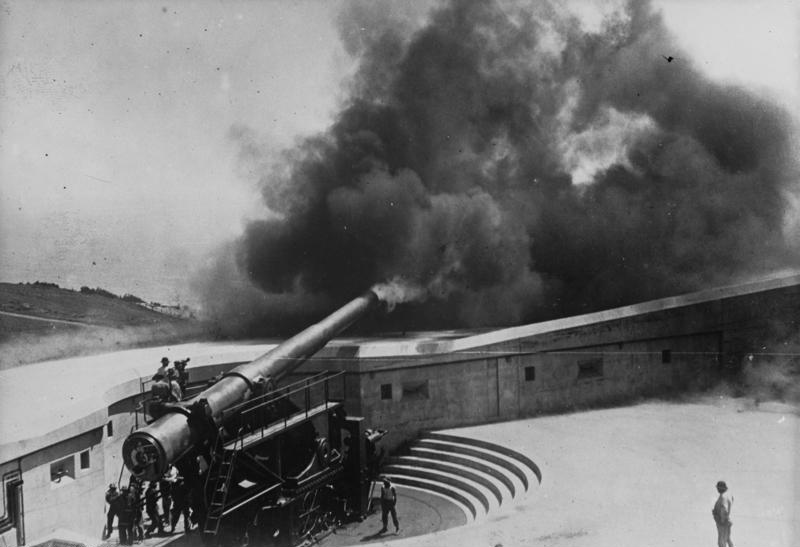
Battery Farley in action

In 1888, President Grover Cleveland designated an area overlooking San Pedro Bay as an unnamed military reservation intended to improve the defenses of the expanding Los Angeles harbor area. Additional land was purchased in 1897 and 1910, and Fort MacArthur was formally created on October 31, 1914.

The fort was a training center during World War I, and the first large gun batteries for harbor defense were installed in 1917. The effectiveness of these fixed gun emplacements was debated for many years, and test firings were extremely unpopular with nearby residents, the concussion shattering windows in buildings and houses for miles around.

In the period between the wars, Fort MacArthur was used as a Citizens' Military Training Camp beginning in 1926 and also by companies of the Civilian Conservation Corps.

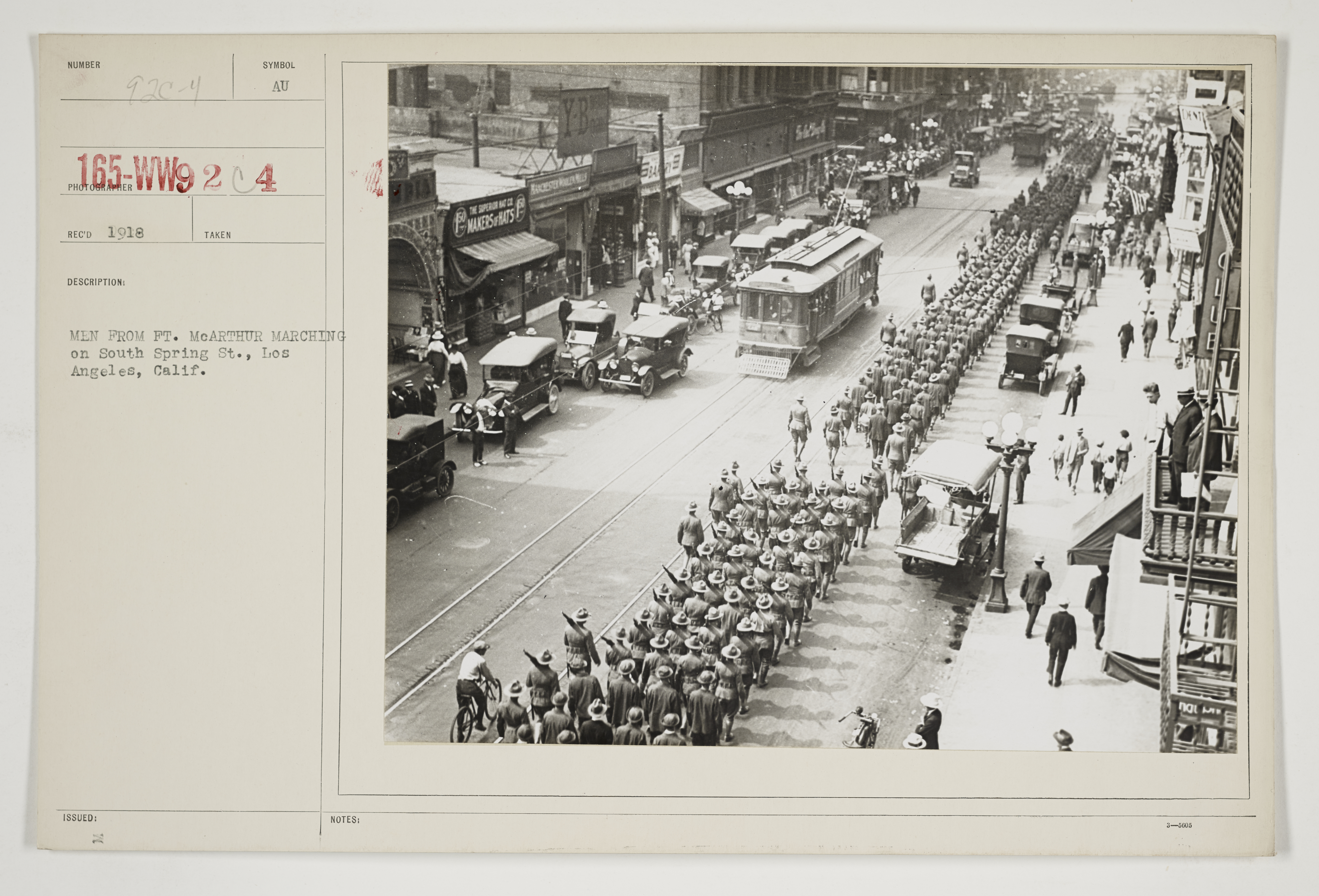
Men from Fort MacArthur marching on South Spring Street, c. 1917

In World War II, Fort MacArthur had a Harbor Entrance Command Post and a Harbor Defense Command Post for US seacoast defense of shipbuilding factories (e.g., CalShip, Todd Pacific), "giant aircraft factories" (Douglas, Hughes, Martin, Northrop), the Huntington Beach Oil Field, and the San Pedro Bay harbor (Port of Los Angeles & Port of Long Beach) which made the Los Angeles metropolitan area a target for attack.

By the end of World War II the large guns were already being removed, with the last decommissioned in 1948. Battery Osgood-Farley is probably the best preserved example of a United States coastal defense gun emplacement, and it was placed on the National Register of Historic Places in 1976. A second site, Battery John Barlow and Saxton, was added to the Register in 1982.

== Air defense ==
During the early years of the Cold War, Fort MacArthur became a key part of the West Coast's anti-aircraft defenses, becoming the home base of the 47th Anti-Aircraft Artillery Brigade. A Nike surface-to-air missile battery was activated at the fort in 1954, remaining in service until the early 1970s.

The Fort MacArthur Direction Center (DC) was the U.S. Army Air Defense Command Post (AADCP) for the Project Nike batteries of the Los Angeles Defense Area. It was located at Fort MacArthur from 1960.

=== Purpose ===
The Direction Center provided radar coverage for integrating the area's Integrated Fire Control (IFC) sites (16 sites for MIM-14 Nike-Hercules missiles until 1968). The DC had High Frequency Crosstell communication with the 1959–1966 Semi-Automatic Ground Environment (SAGE) Master Direction Center at Norton Air Force Base (DC-17) for coordinating Army intercepts of targets penetrating through the larger USAF Los Angeles Air Defense Sector defended by fighter aircraft.

=== History ===
During the Korean War, the fort's L-43 Lashup Radar Network site provided radar surveillance for the area from 1950 to 1952. The 669th Radar Squadron was assigned to the fort on January 1, 1951. On February 16, 1960, Lt Col James L McCallister was the Missile Director for the defense area.

The Fort MacArthur Direction Center (DC) began in 1960 with an AN/FSG-1 computer that was the last of 10 installed and which replaced an Interim Battery Data Link (IBDL). The Army dedicated the DC's Missile Master bunker with an Antiaircraft Operations Center ("Blue Room") on December 14, 1960, prior to the USAF/FAA ARSR-1C radar opening in 1961 at San Pedro Hill Air Force Station. Fort MacArthur's 47th Artillery Brigade operated the DC, and the vacuum tube AN/FSG-1 was replaced on January 31, 1967, with a solid-state Hughes AN/TSQ-51 Air Defense Command and Coordination System.

On November 15, 1968, the 19th Artillery Group (Air Defense) replaced the 47th Artillery Brigade in command of the DC and its batteries. The 19th Group deactivated July 1, 1974, after Project Concise ended Nike operations. The tennis courts next to the bunker remain at the former site of the AADCP's building 554, and the Missile Master nuclear bunker (building 550) was razed c. 1985.

== Rundown of the fort ==
In 1975 Fort MacArthur became a sub-post of Fort Ord, and the Army transferred ownership of the fort's Upper and Lower Reservations to the City of Los Angeles two years later. The Lower Reservation was cleared off and dredged and is now the city's Cabrillo Marina.

Fort MacArthur's remaining Middle Reservation was transferred to the United States Air Force in 1982 for use by Los Angeles Air Force Base for administration and housing.

== Angels Gate Park ==
The Upper Reservation is now a city park: San Pedro's Angels Gate Park, home of the Korean Bell of Friendship.

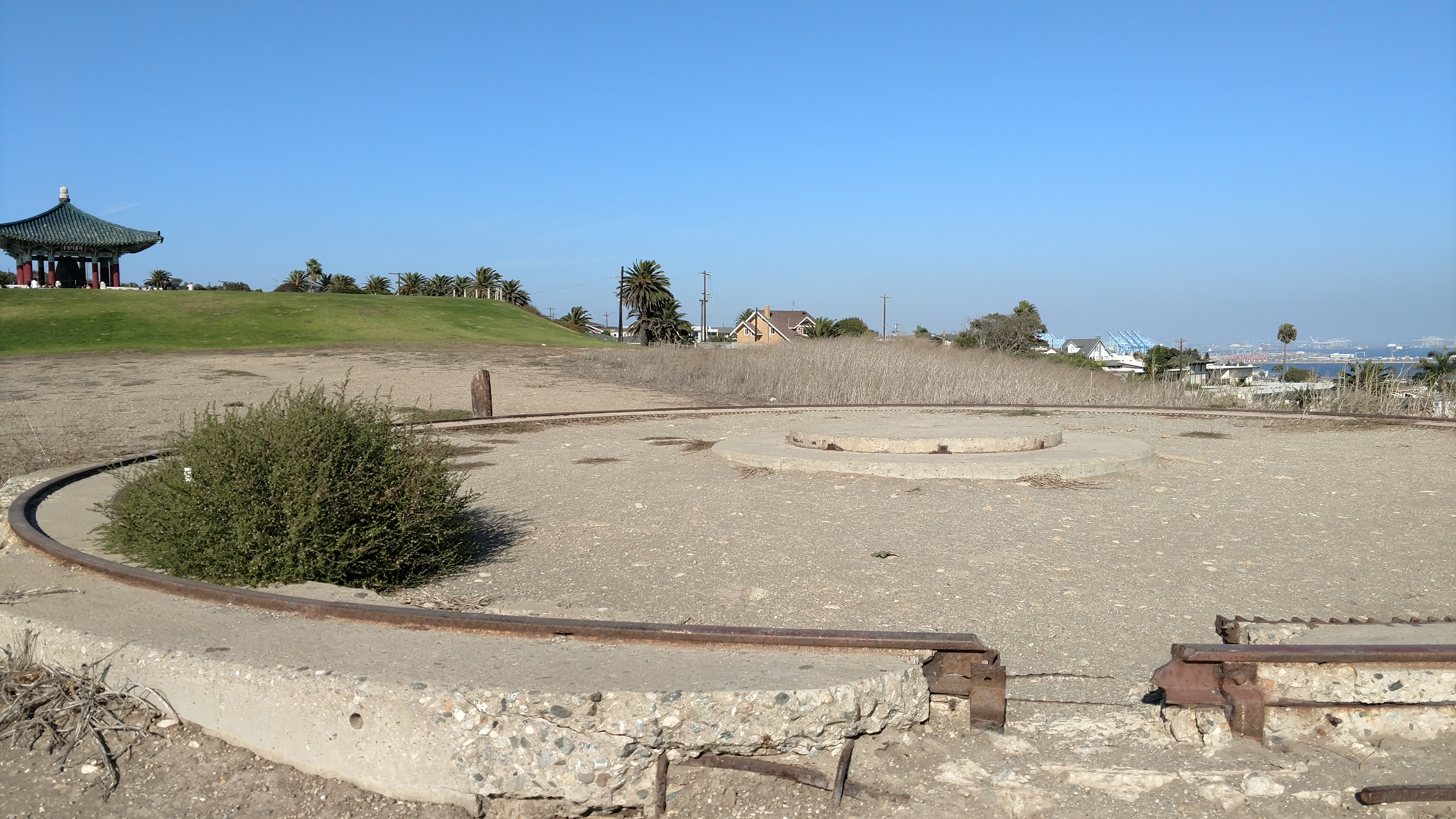
A gun battery emplacement, just west of Battery 241 (beneath the Korean Bell of Friendship, seen in upper left), at Fort MacArthur military base in San Pedro, CA.

== Museum ==
The Fort MacArthur Military Museum, located at the site of Battery Osgood-Farley, displays exhibits on the history of Fort MacArthur, its role in defending the Los Angeles area, the Pacific War (Pacific Ocean Areas and the South West Pacific Area under MacArthur), and the role of Los Angeles as a military port.

== Appearances in popular culture ==
The Battle of Los Angeles and Fort MacArthur Museum are featured in California's Gold episode 6005 with Huell Howser. It is referenced in the 2001 movie Swordfish.

It has been used for location shooting in such television series as 24, The A-Team, The Bionic Woman, JAG, and NCIS. Also in films including A Few Good Men (doubling as Guantanamo Bay barracks), Dragnet, Sgt. Bilko, Midway and Tora! Tora! Tora!. The video for Madonna's "Like a Prayer" (1989) was filmed at Fort MacArthur.

NCIS: Origins is filmed on a 1990s era recreated set of Camp Pendleton, built at Fort MacArthur.

== See also ==
- 63rd Coast Artillery (United States)
- 14-inch M1920 railway gun
- List of Registered Historic Places in Los Angeles
- Casa de San Pedro, a California Historic Landmark on the Fort
- List of Los Angeles Historic-Cultural Monuments in the Harbor area
