= Drum Barracks =

19th-century U.S. Army base in California

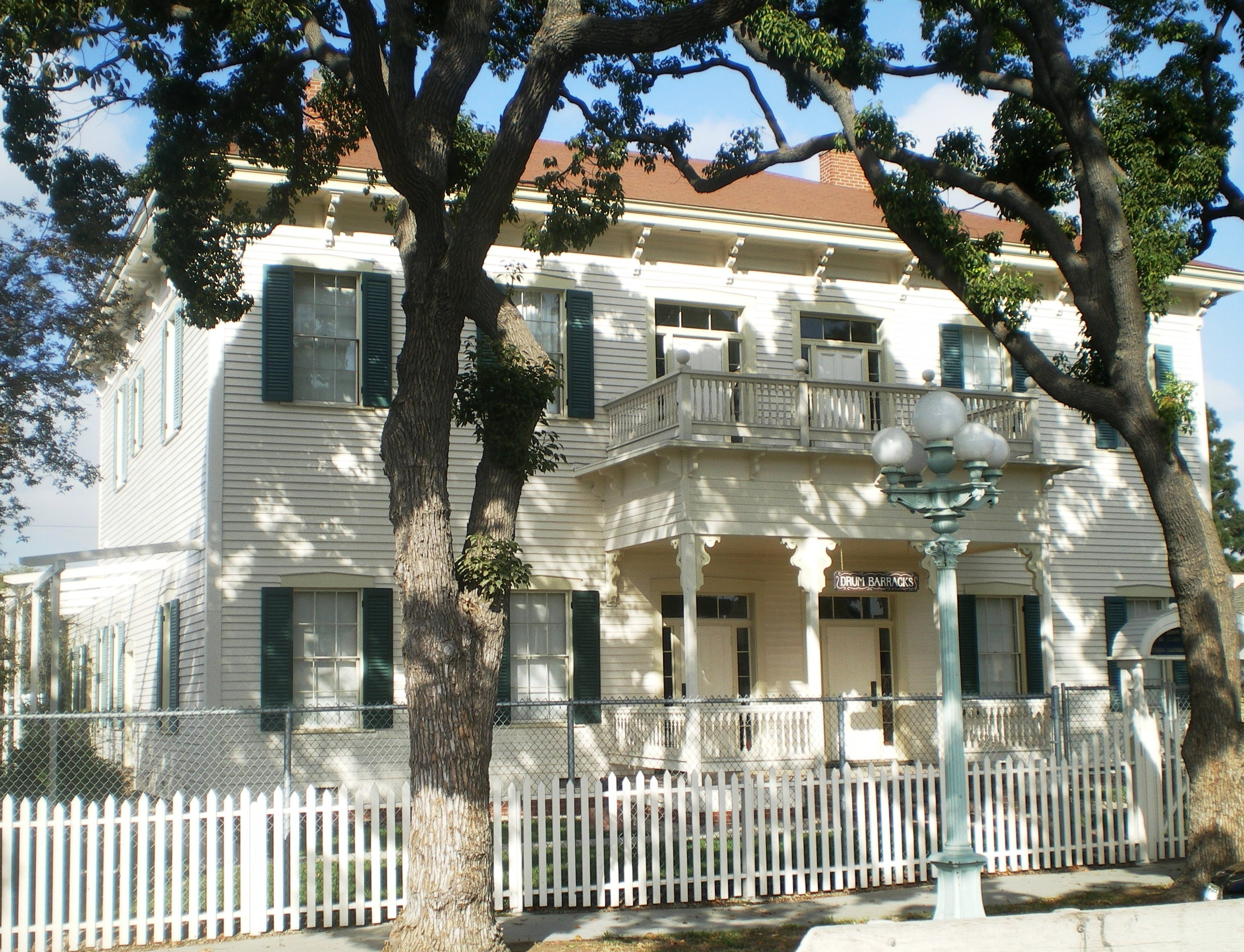
Drum Barracks Civil War Museum, August 2008

Drum Barracks was the Union Army's headquarters for Southern California and New Mexico during the Civil War. It consisted of 19 buildings on 60 acres (240,000 m2) in what is now Wilmington, with another 37 acres (150,000 m2) near the waterfront. Its junior officers' quarters has been preserved as the Drum Barracks Civil War Museum. Its powder magazine stands on private property three blocks away, protected by a chain-link fence.

== History ==
In August, 1861, Confederate Colonel John R. Baylor proclaimed the Confederate Territory of Arizona and sent a detachment to occupy Tucson. Union officials in Southern California responded by organizing the available troops into the California Column, which marched east and confronted the Confederates at Picacho Pass, Arizona.

The withdrawal of regular troops presented Los Angeles with a threefold crisis:

- The majority of Southern Californians favored the Confederacy, and pro-Confederate demonstrations were made in Los Angeles and El Monte. There was fear that they might seize Southern California, gain control over the gold being mined near San Bernardino and use San Pedro Bay as a base for privateers that would raid the gold ships leaving San Francisco for Cape Horn.
- Indians in California and what is now Arizona saw the war as the chance of a lifetime to seize cattle, drive off settlers and reclaim their lands.
- Turmoil in Mexico could allow the Confederates to launch cross-border raids or even invade by way of Mexico.

The response was to build a major installation, adjacent to San Pedro Bay and 25 miles south of Los Angeles, to be garrisoned by troops moved from Fort Tejon and later by recruits from Northern California and from among the loyal minority in the area. While the land was donated by Union sympathizers Phineas Banning and Benjamin Wilson, the construction cost eventually reached $1 million.

== Naming the new post ==
The Drum Barracks is named for Richard Coulter Drum, Assistant Adjutant General of the Army's Department of the Pacific in San Francisco. He supervised construction from his office, visiting the post only after its completion in 1863.

In 1863, Major Bennett, the post commander, wrote to the Adjutant-General in Washington asking that the name be changed to Fort Drum, comparing it to Fort Snelling, Minnesota and Fort Leavenworth, Kansas. No response to the letter has been found.

Drum was also honored with Fort Drum in the Philippines, built shortly after he died in 1909.

Fort Drum, New York is named for Lieutenant General Hugh A. Drum, while Fort Drum, Florida is named for a post built during the Second Seminole War in 1842.

== Arrest of Confederate sympathizers ==
At least three of the leading citizens of Los Angeles were arrested and taken to the Drum Barracks.

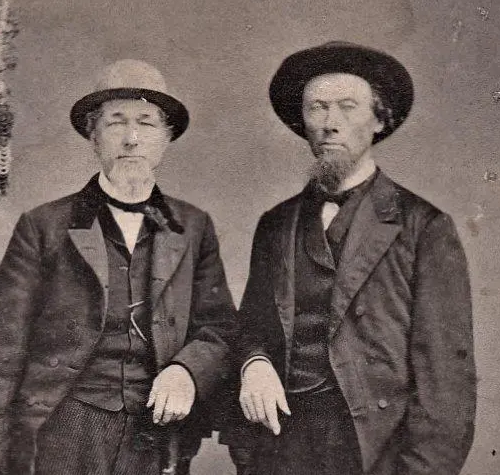
One of these men is Los Angeles publisher Henry Hamilton

Newspaper publisher Henry Hamilton was arrested In Los Angeles on October 17, 1862 and taken to the Drum Barracks. From there he was placed aboard a steamer to be taken to San Francisco and confinement at Fort Alcatraz. He took an oath of allegiance to the United States and was back in Los Angeles within two weeks.

The immediate cause of his arrest is not known, but one of his many editorials had said that the Northern mobilization was an abolition war, "instigated, carried on, and to be consummated, by the degradation of the white race, and the elevation of the African family over them" and that "Black Republican" rule "has degenerated into worse than an Oriental despotism."

The photo shown here has inscriptions stating that Hamilton is on the left. A copy of the photo, taken decades later, has a description indicating that Hamilton is on the right.

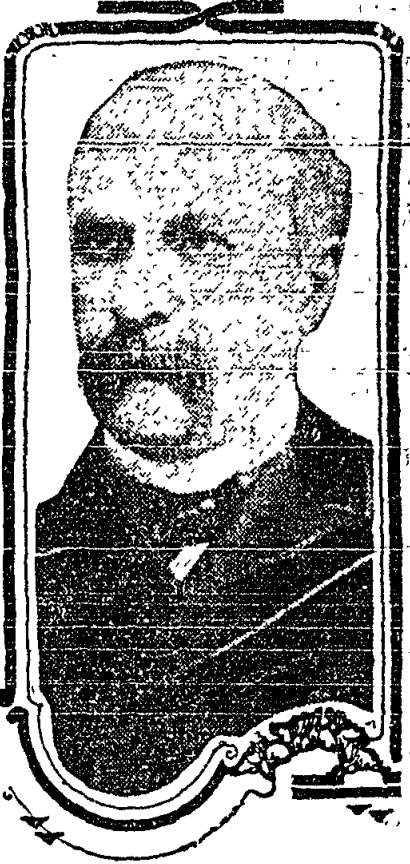
Undersheriff A.J. King

Undersheriff A.J. King was arrested at the request of the newly appointed US Marshal, Henry D. Barrows, for saying "that he owed no allegiance to the United States Government; that Jeff Davis' was the only constitutional government we had, and that he remained here because he could do more harm to the enemies of that Government by staying here than going there" and for publicly displaying "a large lithograph gilt-framed portrait of Beauregard, the rebel general, which he flaunted before a large crowd at the hotel." He took an oath of allegiance to the United States and was released.

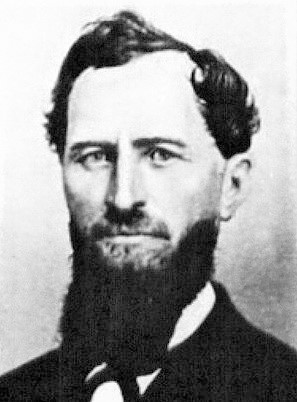
State assemblyman Edward J. C. Kewen

In October, 1862, a month after he had been elected to the state Assembly, former California Attorney General and later Los Angeles District Attorney E.J.C. Kewen was arrested for ‘treasonable utterance’ and sent to Fort Alcatraz in San Francisco Bay. After two weeks, he took an oath of allegiance, posted a $5,000 bond and was released.

The report of the arrest does not say what the utterance was, but one of his speeches was published later:

“What sorcery is there in the name of Lincoln that it should move the world to extraordinary homage and devotion, and obliterate all the monuments of ancient security and freedom? … It is not remarkable, therefore, that the Executive should be delirious with power, when the magic of his influence is illustrated by such extraordinary effects of willing obedience and fanatical proscription…

“I am not enamored with this word loyalty. It belongs to kingly and not to free government.”

== Preventing civil unrest ==
Drum Barracks troops were stationed at San Bernardino for most of the war and made intermittent encampments at El Monte.

When Union officials prepared to register Los Angeles men for the military draft, Southern sympathizers threatened disruptions. Two companies of Drum Barracks troops were hurried to Los Angeles and encamped on the outskirts of town. Later, one company moved to the Plaza and a squad guarded the Provost Marshal's office. California's draft quota was eventually filled by volunteers, and the threat of a draft ended.

News of the Union victory at Gettysburg and the fall of Vicksburg in 1863 sparked celebrations that were interrupted when armed secessionists appeared. Shots were fired, and Drum Barracks troops, on their way to the Owens Valley as an escort to a supply train, intervened. Continuing demonstrations by secessionists required the dispatch of 25 additional men to take up a post near Los Angeles in a position to command the town.

== Conflict with Native Americans ==
A new wave of Indian raids began as soon as troops were withdrawn from outlying posts. Troops sent east from Los Angeles to confront Confederates first "had to fight the Apaches, hereditary enemies of the Pumas and Maricopas; and the Navajos were also war-like. From Tucson into New Mexico, in fact, the column had to fight its way through hostile Indians, who lurked in every mountain pass, and guarded every water hole."

Named battles and campaigns fought by Los Angeles troops against Indians included the Battle of Apache Pass and the Owens Valley Indian War.

== Threats from Mexico ==
The Reform War had been raging in Mexico since 1858 and French troops intervened in 1862.

A Confederate force occupied Tucson in 1862 and sent Colonel James Reily to Hermosillo, capital of the Mexican state of Sonora, to ask Governor Ignacio Pesqueira for permission to buy supplies in Mexico and to establish a "depot" at Guaymas on the Gulf of California. When his letter of introduction from Confederate General Sibley was sent for translation, the translators shared its contents with two pro-Union businessmen, who reported it to Union General George Wright in California. He responded with a threatening letter to Pesqueira and authorized Colonel Carleton in Yuma to cross the border if Sibley's forces entered Sonora.

Los Angeles troops, including the Spanish-speaking Native California Cavalry, patrolled the border and made at least three incursions into the Mexican state of Sonora. In 1862, Captain Fritz pursued a group that had stolen government horses, saddles and carbines. He recovered the property at Hermosillo, 350 miles south of Tucson. The following year, Captain Tuttle pursued a group of Confederate sympathizers who had stolen cattle on their way to join Confederate forces in Texas. He captured them and the livestock in the village of Altar. In September, 1865, five months after Robert E Lee had surrendered, Captain Pico left Fort Mason in pursuit of 16 troopers who had deserted with their arms and equipment and 30 army horses. He caught up with them at Magdalena, 90 miles away. They were challenged by the local Mexican garrison, loyal to Emperor Maximilian, who was not recognized by the United States. After two tense weeks, they withdrew, empty-handed.

A letter from General Grant, written late in the war, passed on a rumor that former California Senator William M. Gwin had been appointed governor of Sonora by the Imperial government in Mexico and was organizing a Confederate invasion of California. Grant authorized the Army to pursue the invading force back into Mexico and to keep troops there indefinitely. The rumor proved to be false.

== Plot to seize California gold ==
Steamers leaving San Francisco for Panama during the war years carried an average of $1 million in gold each. One shipment exceeded $3 million in value. Kentuckians Asbury Harpending and Ridgely Greathouse proposed a surprise attack on Alcatraz Island followed by occupation of San Francisco. They would then establish an overland gold route "through savage Arizona" to Texas, which would necessarily pass through Los Angeles. The plot was eventually abandoned.

== Camels ==
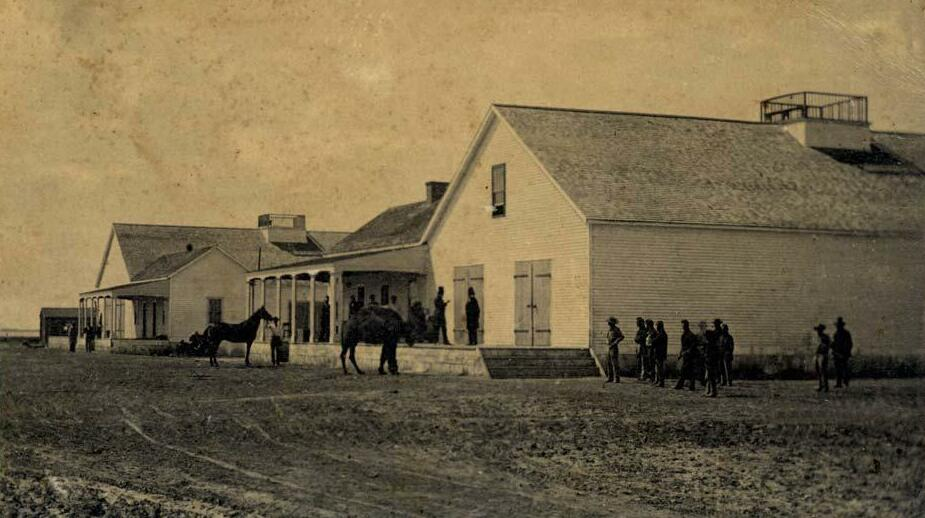
Camel tethered at the Government warehouse, at the waterfront near the Drum Barracks

From 1862 to 1863, the Drum Barracks provided corrals for Army camels that were brought down from Fort Tejon and later sold at auction.

== Postwar years ==
After the Civil War, Camp Drum remained active for several years in the Indian Wars. By 1870, it had been deactivated and fallen into disrepair. In October 1871, the Los Angeles Star reported that all remaining troops at Drum Barracks had been ordered to Fort Yuma. In 1873, the government returned the land to its original donors, Phineas Banning and Benjamin Davis Wilson, after auctioning off the buildings. Not surprisingly, there were no winning bids from buyers who would have to move the buildings or dismantle them for building materials. Banning bought five buildings for $2,917 and Wilson bought one for $200.

== Ghost sightings ==
The museum's resident ghosts were profiled by the Los Angeles Times in 1992, including a description of a ghost who "doesn't know he's dead." The same article said that the building was saved from demolition following "a drawn-out battle more fierce than any of the soldiers stationed here had ever fought." Another profile, "Ghost stories from LA's old Civil War barracks", was published in 2018.

The Drum Barracks was profiled on Unsolved Mysteries in the early 1990s, in a segment narrated by Robert Stack, called 'Civil War Ghosts'. People interviewed in that segment described seeing apparitions of Civil War soldiers. The Barracks was featured in an episode of Most Haunted in 2005.

== Historical designations ==
- California Historical Landmark #169, listed 1935
- Los Angeles Historic-Cultural Monument #21, listed 1963
- National Register Of Historic Places, listed 1971

Drum Barracks has been operated since 1987 as a Civil War museum open to the public.
