= List of people from San Pedro, Los Angeles =

Here are listed people who were born and/or reside (or resided) in San Pedro, Los Angeles.

== Aviation ==
- Larry Walters (1949–1993): piloted a lawn chair with 45 helium-filled weather balloons from his San Pedro residence.

== Acting ==
- Kirk Harris: actor and filmmaker, starred in The Kid: Chamaco; resides in the South Shores area of San Pedro
- Anthony Head: British actor, best known for roles in Joss Whedon's television series Buffy the Vampire Slayer and on BBC television production of Merlin; owns a home in San Pedro
- D. L. Hughley: comedian and actor; attended San Pedro High School
- Sasha Knezev: Serbian American filmmaker; American Addict, American Addict 2, Fragments of Daniela and Welcome to San Pedro
- Mike Lookinland: actor who played youngest brother "Bobby Brady" on The Brady Bunch, 1969–1974; lived in San Pedro while a child actor; attended Chadwick School on Palos Verdes Peninsula, just outside Northwest San Pedro
- Dewey Martin: actor, known for roles in Howard Hawks' 1950s films; as of 2007, lived in San Pedro
- Patrick Muldoon: actor, starred in recurring roles in soap operas, Days of Our Lives and Melrose Place; most well-known feature film is 1997's Starship Troopers; father was a lifeguard at Cabrillo beach in San Pedro

== Music ==
- Ambrosia: rock band with numerous top 40 hits, such as "Biggest Part of Me" and "How Much I Feel"; formed in the South Bay/San Pedro area
- John Bettis: lyricist for Michael Jackson, Madonna, The Carpenters, and Whitney Houston; nominated for an Academy Award, a Golden Globe, three Grammys, and three Emmys; graduated from San Pedro High School
- Blu: Los Angeles-based rapper and record producer who relocated with his family to San Pedro
- Chuck Dukowski: bass player for punk rock band Black Flag
- Pearlretta DuPuy: zither player, musician and civic activist
- Eric Erlandson: co-founder and lead guitarist of 1990s grunge rock band Hole; born and raised in San Pedro
- Eva Gustavson: opera singer
- Jim Korthe: vocalist for rap-metal group 3rd Strike; grew up in San Pedro and attended Bishop Montgomery High School (Catholic) in Torrance as a teenager; died in his San Pedro home in 2010
- Stephen Kovacevich: classical pianist and conductor
- Miguel (born Miguel Jontel Pimentel): singer; native of San Pedro
- The Minutemen: eclectic punk rock trio formed in San Pedro, where its members grew up; the surviving former members, bassist/songwriter, Mike Watt, and drummer, George Hurley, still live there; Watt remains active in the city's music scene
- Krist Novoselic: grew up in San Pedro after his Croatian father emigrated to the Croatian enclave in the southern Californian city; Nirvana bassist
- People Under The Stairs: hip hop group
- Art Pepper: jazz saxophonist; born in nearby Gardena, California, raised in San Pedro
- Remble, prominent rapper for his 2021 well liked single "Touchable", born in San Pedro.
- Michael Quercio: Singer, songwriter, bassist in The Salvation Army, The Three O'Clock, Game Theory, Permanent Green Light, and Jupiter Affect. Born in Carson, California and has lived in San Pedro since 1998.
- Brenton Wood: 1960s pop-soul composer and vocalist; His parents and 11 siblings moved to San Pedro from Louisiana in the 1940s, but eventually settled in Compton. Brenton went to Compton High School. He achieved his biggest chart hits with "Gimme Little Sign", a song that reached #9 on the 1967 pop charts, and "The Oogum Boogum Song", released in the same year. He had a strong, hard-core fan base for over 50 years, especially with the Latino community, and toured regularly. He last performed in 2024 before his death in January, 2025, at age 83.
- Rotting Out: Hardcore punk band formed in San Pedro

== Politics ==
- John S. Gibson Jr.: Los Angeles City Council representative; founded the first Boys' Club of California in 1937; lived in San Pedro until his death in 1981
- James Hahn: former mayor of Los Angeles; a resident of the city as of 2011
- Janice Hahn: former City Councilwoman (15th district), U.S. Congresswoman for the 36th District, and current Los Angeles County Supervisor representing the Fourth District; resides in the area as of 2011; her San Pedro Field Office is located at 302 W 5th St, #200
- A.E. Henning: Rotarian Special Representative for Torrance; Los Angeles City Council member (1929–1931)
- Joe Hill: radical songwriter, labor activist, and member of Industrial Workers of the World (The Wobblies); lived and worked in San Pedro in the early 20th century; began his labor organizing activism in the area; secretary of San Pedro Wobblies chapter; imprisoned 30 days after role in organization of 1912 dockworkers' strike in which 200 Italian workers abandoned their posts
- Yuri Kochiyama: human rights activist (in Harlem, New York and Oakland, California); Nobel Peace Prize nominee; worked with Black Power organizations; a leader of Asian American and redress movements in New York City
- Mike Lansing: served two terms on Los Angeles Unified School District board; executive director of Boys & Girls Clubs of Los Angeles Harbor as of 2011; born and raised in San Pedro
- Jerry Sanders: former mayor of San Diego
- Vincent Thomas: elected as a California Assemblyman representing 68th District, 1940–1978; served 19 consecutive terms; the Vincent Thomas Bridge was named in his honor in 1961 and opened in 1963; Croatian immigrant who moved with his family to San Pedro at age 10

== Science ==
- John Martinis: physicist and recipient of the 2025 Nobel Prize in Physics for the discovery of macroscopic quantum mechanical tunnelling and energy quantisation in an electric circuit
- Sarah P. Monks (1841–1926): local naturalist, teacher, writer
- John Olguin: Director of the Cabrillo Marine Aquarium, 1949–1987; founding member of the American Cetacean Society; referred to as the "father of recreational whale watching"

== Sports ==
- J. C. Agajanian (1913–1984): auto racing promoter and owner; member of Motorsports Hall of Fame of America; born in San Pedro
- Joe Amalfitano: baseball player, coach and manager; played for New York Giants (1954–1960), San Francisco Giants (1960–1962 and 1963), Houston Colt .45s (1962), Chicago Cubs (1964–1967), manager of Cubs (1979–81); born in San Pedro
- Alan Ashby: catcher for Houston Astros, Toronto Blue Jays, and Cleveland Indians between 1973 and 1989; sportscaster; born in Long Beach, attended high school in San Pedro
- Denise Austin: fitness instructor and author; creator of more than 80 workout videos/DVDs; high sales totals led to 2003 induction in Video Hall of Fame
- Joel Bitonio: 5x Pro Bowl and 5x All Pro National Football League Guard for the Cleveland Browns
- James Cotton Jr.: basketball player; 6-foot-5 forward; shooting guard for Chicago Bulls (1999) following terms with Seattle SuperSonics (1997–1999) and Denver Nuggets (1997); raised in San Pedro; attended high school in Lakewood
- Joe Danelo: football placekicker; played for Washington State Cougars and New York Giants; raised three sons in San Pedro where he worked as a foreman on city's docks
- Mario Danelo: record-setting placekicker for 2006 NCAA national champion USC Trojans; fell to his death at cliffs near Point Fermin lighthouse in early 2007
- Ralph DeQuebec: 2018 Paralympian Sled Hockey Gold Medalist.
- Kevin Elster: 1986 World Series Champion Baseball player with the New York Mets
- Lillian Faralla: baseball player, All-American Girls Professional Baseball League
- Gary Gabelich (1940–1984): in Guinness Book of World Records for land-speed world record of 622.287 miles per hour (1,001.474 km/h) at Bonneville Salt Flats, Utah, in 1970; the record remained unbeaten until 1983; born in San Pedro
- Bob Gross: basketball player, forward for Portland Trail Blazers, 1977 NBA champions
- Alfred Guth (1908–1996), Austrian-born American water polo player, swimmer, and Olympic modern pentathlete
- Brian Harper: baseball player, catcher for 1991 World Series champion Minnesota Twins; born in Los Angeles, attended high school in San Pedro
- Aaron Hicks: baseball player, outfielder for Baltimore Orioles; born in San Pedro
- Dennis Johnson: basketball player for Boston Celtics in 1970s and 1980s, inducted into Hall of Fame in 2010; born in Compton, was discovered playing in local leagues in San Pedro
- Richard Johnson: football player; 1984 USFL Receiver of the Year for Houston Gamblers; attended San Pedro High School
- Ed Jurak: baseball player, infielder for Boston Red Sox during 1970s and 1980s; attended San Pedro High School
- Garry Maddox: baseball player, eight-time Gold Glove winner and starting center fielder for 1980 World Series champion Philadelphia Phillies
- Haven Moses: football player, wide receiver for Denver Broncos in 1970; remained with Broncos until his retirement in 1981, appeared in two Super Bowls; attended Fermin de Lasuen Catholic High in San Pedro
- Willie Naulls (1934–2018): basketball player for UCLA; power forward/center for New York Knicks and Boston Celtics; four-time National Basketball Association (NBA) All-Star, won three NBA Championships with Celtics in 1960s; first African-American captain in history of integrated professional sports; at age 9, his family relocated to a government housing project in San Pedro
- Robb Nen: baseball player, relief pitcher for Texas Rangers, Florida Marlins, and San Francisco Giants; three-time All-Star and 1997 World Series champion; born in San Pedro
- Angela Nikodinov: figure skater; finished third at 2001 U.S. championships and fifth at world championships; hometown is San Pedro
- Brian Ortega: UFC professional fighter
- Petros Papadakis: sports broadcaster, started show Petros & Money on AM 570/Fox Sports station in 2007; college football commentator on Fox Sports Net and hosted Spike TV's Pros vs. Joes; born in San Pedro
- Norm Schachter: football official for National Football League (NFL) who refereed first Super Bowl; died in San Pedro
- Tim Wrightman: football player for UCLA; starting tight end (TE) for Super Bowl XX champion Chicago Bears; known as San Pedro's "Golden Boy"

== Writers and poets ==
- Louis Adamic (1899–1951): Slovenian-American novelist who frequently wrote about Los Angeles; settled in San Pedro after serving in World War I and worked as watchman in office of harbor pilot during 1920s
- Richard Armour: poet and author who wrote more than 60 books; born in San Pedro
- Charles Bukowski: author and poet who lived in San Pedro during his later years; interviewed in his San Pedro home for 2004 documentary Bukowski: Born Into This
- Richard Henry Dana Jr.: author of memoir Two Years Before the Mast; not a resident, but visitor to San Pedro who wrote about the experience; San Pedro's first middle school is named after him
- Jeanne Wakatsuki Houston: author of popular memoir Farewell to Manzanar on internment of Japanese-Americans during World War II; briefly lived in East San Pedro (Terminal Island)
- Louis L'Amour: Western fiction writer, chronicled some of his San Pedro beach experiences in 1980 book Yondering
- Scott O'Dell (1898–1989): author of young adult literature, lived in East San Pedro (Terminal Island) during his childhood
- John Shannon: author of "Jack Liffey" series of noir thrillers; grew up in San Pedro
- Gary North: economist, historian, writer, and leading figure in the Christian reconstructionist movement.

== Film and television ==
- Tony Scott: producer, director, actor, cinematographer, writer, and editor; committed suicide by jumping off Vincent Thomas Bridge in the San Pedro port district
- Robert Towne: four-time Academy Award-winning writer, director, producer, and actor; body of work includes screenplays for Chinatown (1974), Mission: Impossible (1996), Mission: Impossible 2 (2000), The Last Detail (1973), Shampoo (1975), The Firm (1993), and Greystoke: The Legend of Tarzan, Lord of the Apes (1984); raised in San Pedro, where he worked as a tuna fisherman

== Organized crime ==
- Joe "Pegleg" Morgan: former head of a Mexican Mafia prison gang; in the 1960s, he was the link between the Mexican Mafia and the West Coast Italian crime syndicates; born in San Pedro to Croatian immigrants; moved to East Los Angeles as a teenager; basis for the character "JD" in the 1992 Edward James Olmos movie American Me

== Organized labor ==
- Jessica Gonzalez: organizer with CODE-CWA; founder of A Better ABK; co-founder of ABK Workers Alliance and Game Workers Alliance
