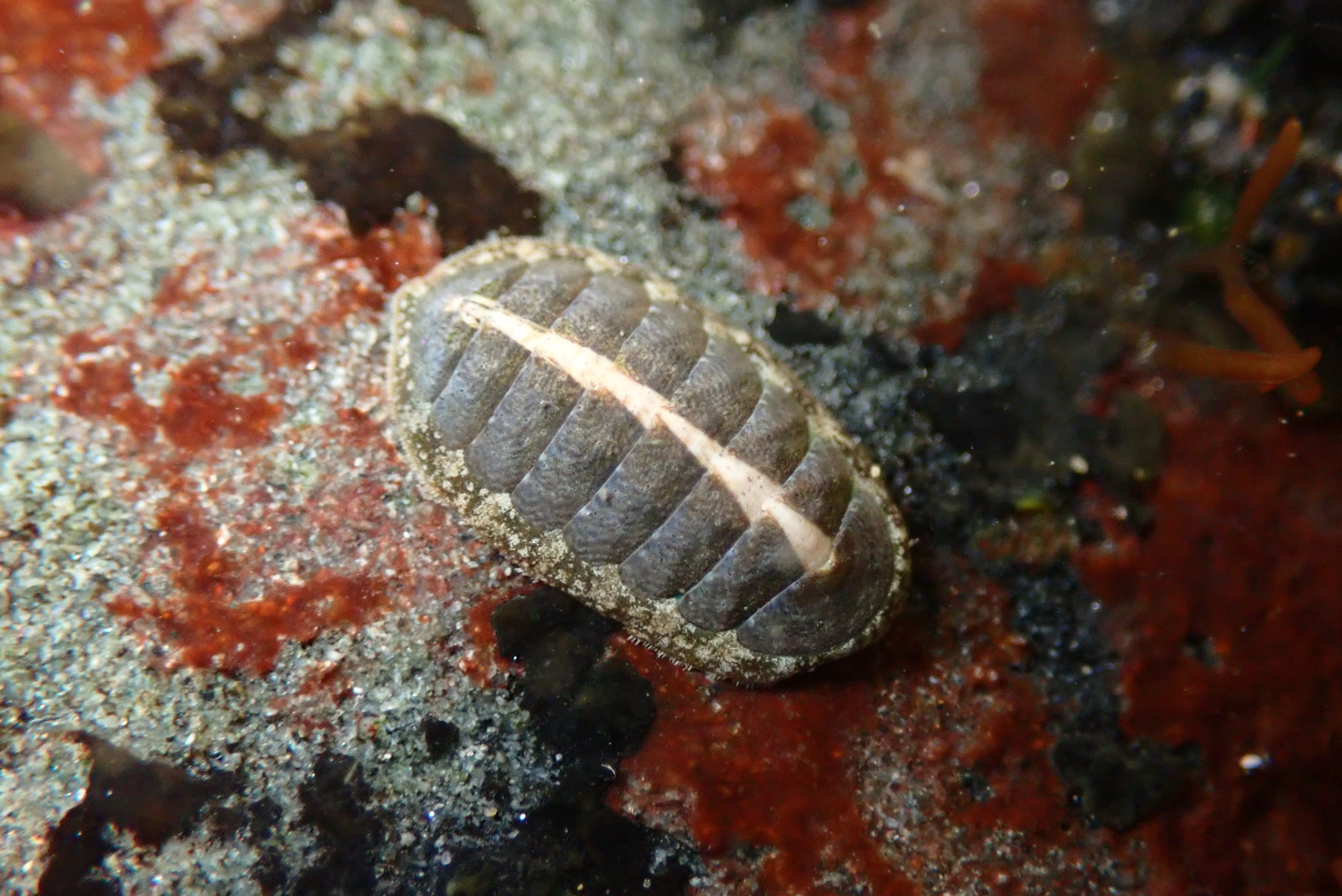

Scientific classification
- Kingdom: Animalia
- Phylum: Mollusca
- Class: Polyplacophora
- Order: Chitonida
- Family: Lepidochitonidae
- Genus: Cyanoplax
- Species: C. keepiana

Binomial name
- Cyanoplax keepiana S.S. Berry, 1948

Synonyms
- Lepidochitona keepiana Ischnochitona keepiana

= Cyanoplax keepiana =

Species of North American chiton

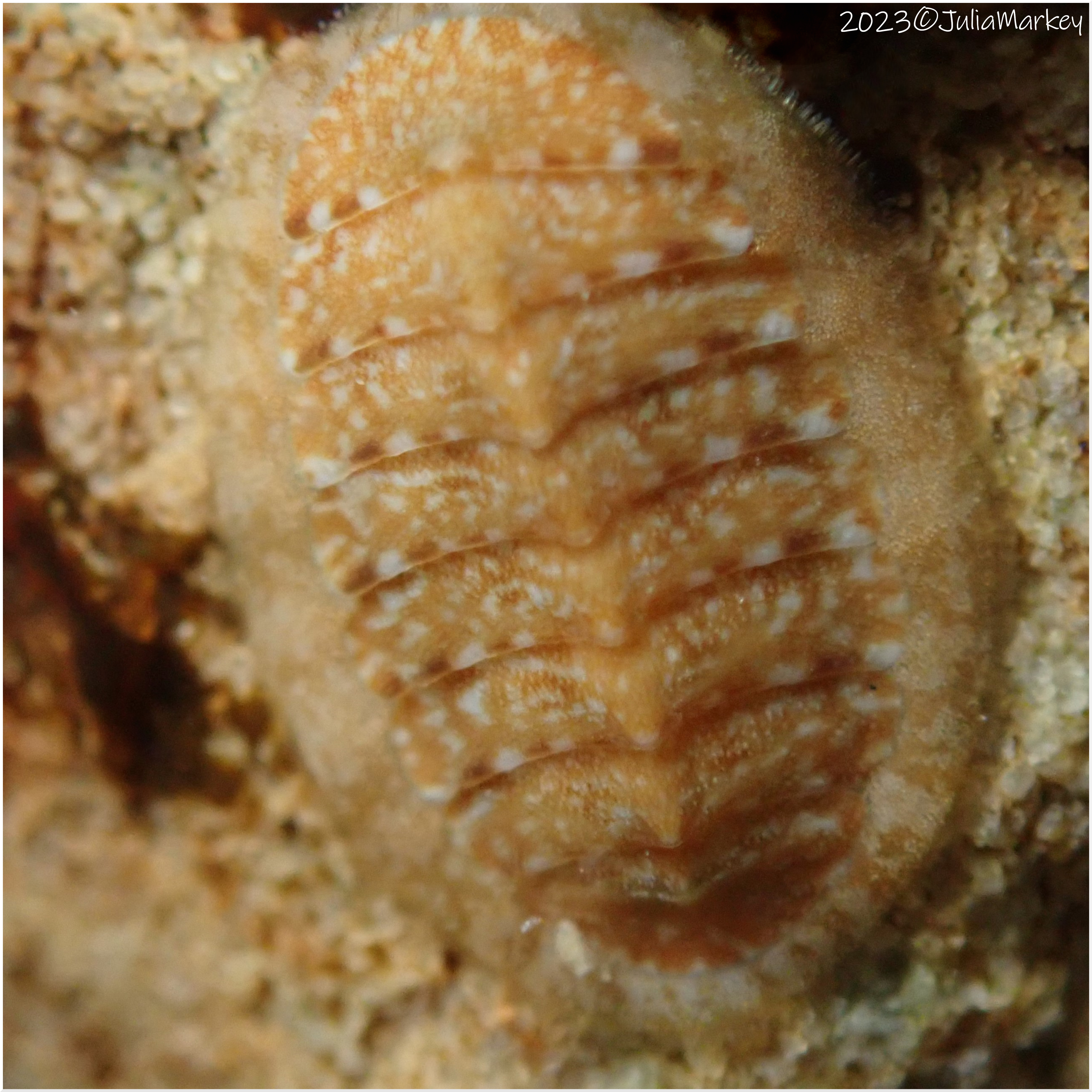
Cyanoplax keepiana observed at White Point Beach in San Pedro, California in November, 2023.

Cyanoplax keepiana, also known as Keep's chiton, is a species of chiton native to the Pacific coast of North America. According to the Cabrillo Marine Aquarium in San Pedro, Keep's chiton has "brilliant blue markings on its plates that can only be appreciated with a hand lens". These small chitons, less than an inch long (18 mm), are usually found in fairly warm water in sandy or rocky tide pools located between Cayucos, California, and the Revillagigedo Islands of Mexico.

This species was described to science by S. Stillman Berry in 1948.
