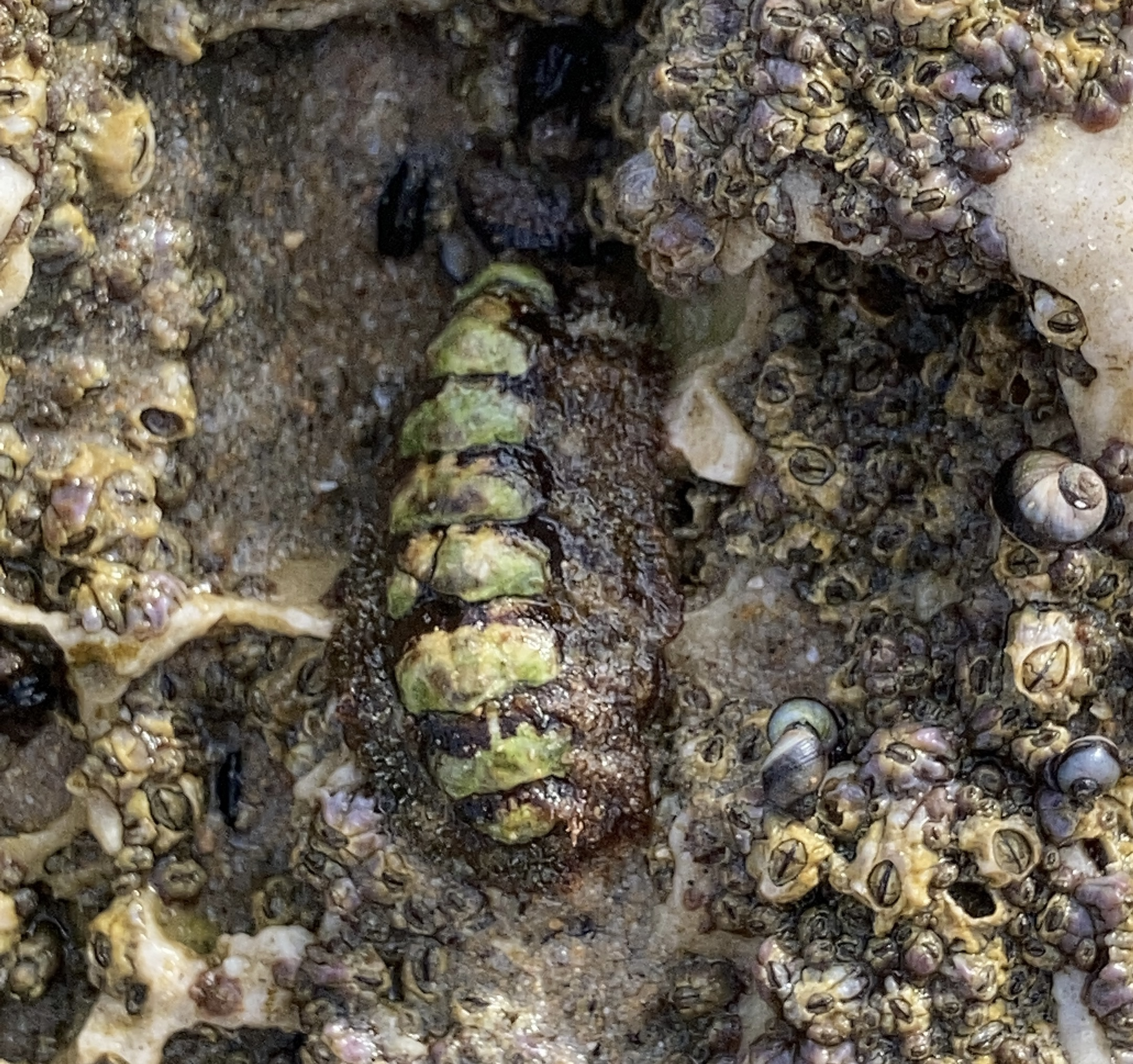
- Nuttallina californica at Crystal Cove State Park

Scientific classification
- Kingdom: Animalia
- Phylum: Mollusca
- Class: Polyplacophora
- Order: Chitonida
- Family: Lepidochitonidae
- Genus: Nuttallina
- Species: N. californica

Binomial name
- Nuttallina californica Reeve, 1847

Synonyms
- Acanthopleura fluxa (P. P. Carpenter, 1864); Chiton californicus (Reeve, 1847); Chiton scaber (Reeve, 1847); Nuttallina fluxa (P. P. Carpenter, 1864); Nuttallina scabra (Reeve, 1847)

= Nuttallina californica =

Species of mollusc

Nuttallina californica, the California spiny chiton, is a species of chiton in the genus Nuttallina native to the coasts of California and Baja California.

== Description ==
This species can reach a maximum length of 5.1 centimetres (2.0 in) in males. The valves are black with an intermittent white stripe that runs dorsally. The girdle is granular and is composed of bristles that are a "reddish-brown" color.

This species is said to be morphologically similar to two other Nuttallina species in California – N. fluxa (Carpenter, 1864) and a studied but undescribed third species (Piper, 1984), and are difficult to distinguish without genetic analyses. Some authors question whether they are even distinct species.

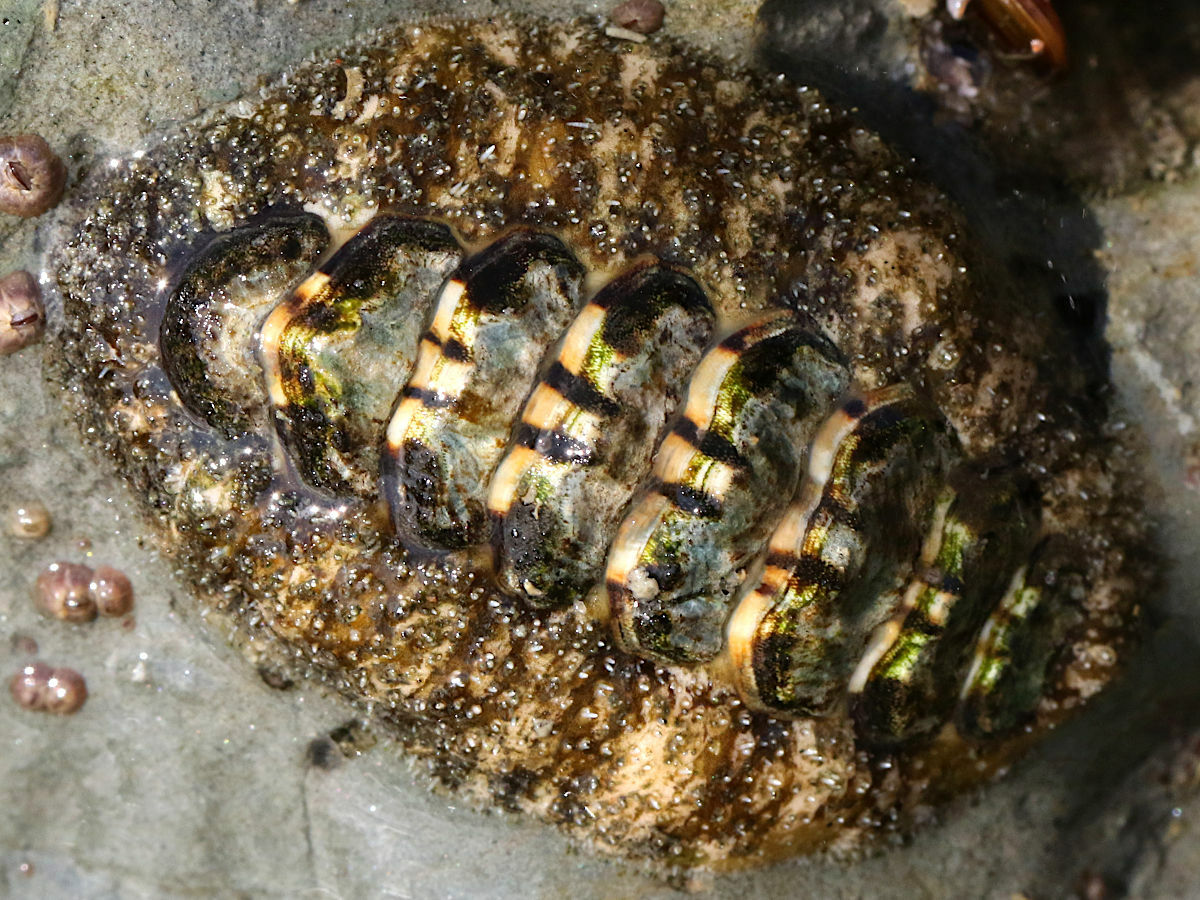
upperside, Torrey Pines State Beach

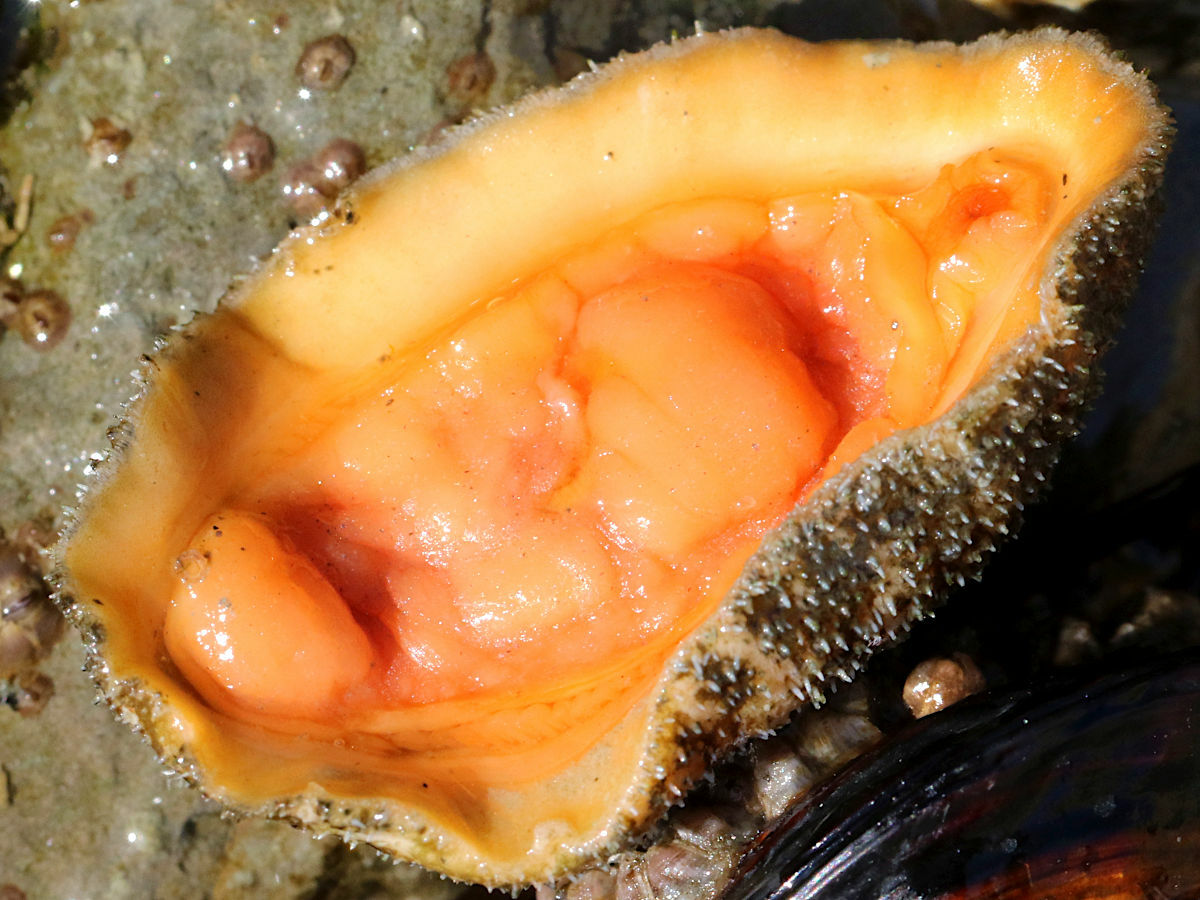
underside, Torrey Pines State Beach

== Distribution and habitat ==
N. californica is endemic to the western coast of North America, specifically California and Baja California, hence its specific epithet and common name. In general, N. californica dominates sites north of Point Conception, while morphologically similar N. fluxa is more common south of Point Conception, even though both species have been found across California. When N. californica is sighted south of Point Conception, it tends to be found in areas with higher wave exposure or cooler temperatures.

N. californica typically live in areas with large amounts of microalgae as it is an important food source for them. It has been hypothesized that these chiton leave behind a slime trail that promotes vegetation growth. It is intertidal and can be found in rock crevices, nearby barnacles and mussels.

== Behavior ==
This species tend to occupy "depressions"—a hole of the shape of the chiton or larger and demonstrate high site fidelity, often either returning to or staying within the same spot in 24 hours, a behavior known as homing.

== Reproduction ==
March to July marks the breeding season for N. californica. During reproduction, female chitons develop oocytes through three stages in the gonads. From September to February, the oocytes grow and mature. March through July is when the oocytes reach stage three of development and are then ready to be released into the water. Alongside, the males will release their sperm into the water to fertilize the eggs. This external breeding process is known as broadcast spawning. The reproductive cycle pauses in August when the gonads become temporarily inactive, but the cycle soon repeats itself after the month ends.
