= Adolph Laudenberg =

American serial killer

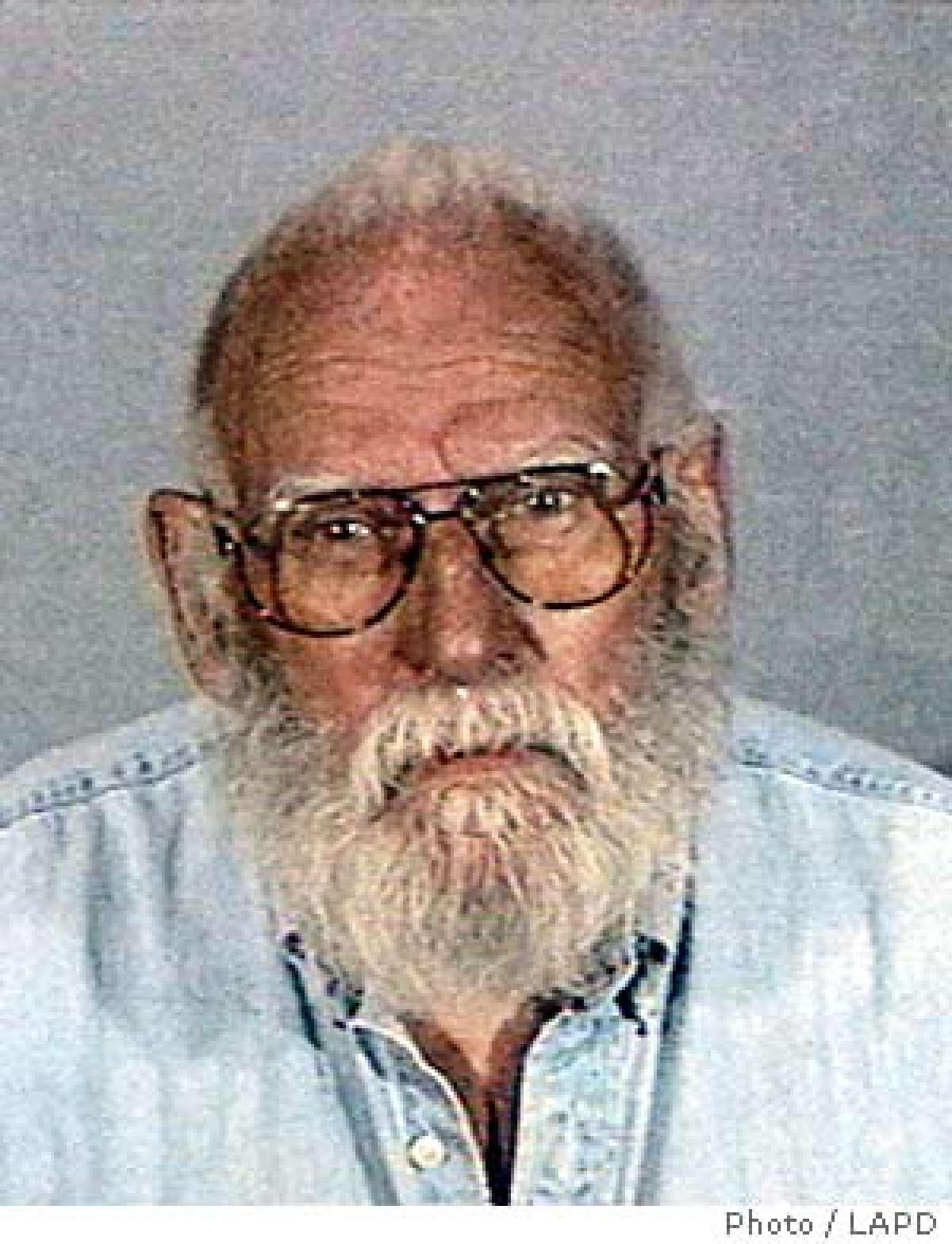
- Mugshot
- Born: Adolph Theodore Laudenberg; June 13, 1926; Lexington, Kentucky, U.S.
- Died: June 26, 2015 (aged 89); California, U.S.
- Other names: "The Santa Strangler" "The Santa Claus Strangler"
- Conviction: First degree murder (1 count)
- Penalty: Life imprisonment without the possibility of parole

Details
- Victims: 4–6
- Span of crimes: December 25, 1972 – March 21, 1975
- Country: United States
- State: California
- Date apprehended: September 5, 2003

Adolph Theodore Laudenberg (June 13, 1926 – June 26, 2015), known as The Santa Strangler, was an American serial killer who murdered three women in the San Pedro neighborhood of Los Angeles and one in San Francisco during the 1970s, and is the prime suspect for another two similar murders. Despite telling two daughters-in-law, decades apart, that he had committed four murders, he was only arrested in 2002, after DNA evidence connected him to the crimes. He was convicted of one murder and sentenced to life imprisonment without the possibility of parole.

== Early life ==
Adolph Laudenberg was born in Lexington, Kentucky, in 1926, to a German immigrant butcher and his wife, who died a few years after his birth. At some point, he took up whittling unique walking canes made from salvaged wood and manzanita shrubs, which he would either give away or sell for $10 on the street. While serving in the naval construction battalion in Trinidad, British West Indies, in 1944, Laudenberg met his future wife, Annelle. He adopted her son, Steve, and the couple moved to California permanently after Adolph left the service. He then got a job as a security guard at a steel plant before becoming a cab driver in the San Pedro area in the late 1960s.

According to neighbors, the Laudenbergs were an odd fit—Annelle worked at a dance studio, and was outgoing and health-conscious, while Adolph was a generous but reclusive man who mostly kept to himself. Despite their differences, their marriage lasted 30 years before the couple separated, as Annelle, who didn't return her husband's feelings of love, outed herself as a stripper. Adolph remarried but divorced again. At some point, he traveled for a short time to New Orleans before returning to San Pedro.

== Murders ==
Using his job as a cab driver, Laudenberg's modus operandi consisted of picking up lonely, alcoholic, or ill women who reminded him of his ex-wife, whom he would then bind, rape, and strangle, either in Los Angeles or San Francisco. He was questioned by police during the initial investigations but denied everything, and since the perpetrator left barely any clues behind, he was let off.

=== Proven ===
- Lois Petrie (43)—An alcoholic whose husband had recently died from cancer, Petrie was last seen at a San Pedro bar on Christmas Day in 1972. The following day, she was found strangled in her apartment's bedroom, partially nude and with signs of sexual assault.
- Catherine Medina (50)—On August 18, 1974, Medina was discovered in a local San Pedro bar by her husband, who forced her out after an argument. As the couple walked home, the drunk Catherine ran away and jumped into the van of an unidentified man, which sped off. The following day, her nude body was found beside some bushes in Harbor Lake Recreational Park.
- Anna Felch (54)—About a month after the Medina killing, on September 4, the killer struck again. Felch, who worked at a hot dog stand on Cabrillo Beach, disappeared after leaving a San Pedro bar in the dead of night, inebriated. A few hours later, a construction worker found her body a few blocks away. Felch had been sexually assaulted and strangled to death.
- Leah Griffin (60)—A retired legal secretary and heavy drinker who had recently been diagnosed with breast cancer, Griffin was bound, raped, and strangled at a residential hotel in San Francisco on March 21, 1975.

=== Suspected ===
- Irene Hind (55)—Hind was the owner of a San Francisco bar on Larkin Street called Irene's Domar Club. A generous woman who helped the people who frequented her place, she was found raped and strangled on March 12, 1974.
- Maude Burgess (83)—A retiree who helped with the management of her San Francisco apartment building, the elderly Burgess was found raped and strangled in her unit in November 1974. A partial fingerprint was located at the scene, but it was found to not match Laudenberg.

== Arrest, trial, and imprisonment ==
In 1975, Laudenberg confessed to his future daughter-in-law that he had killed four women—three in San Pedro and one in San Francisco—which he called his “four sins.” The woman believed his story and told the authorities, but despite their efforts, they couldn't prove the veracity of the claims. In 2002, however, he told the same story to another son's ex-wife Renee in far greater detail. She notified the San Luis Obispo police, who, armed with advances in DNA, began re-examining the cold cases. Since Laudenberg had no criminal record, they had to find a way to obtain his DNA through other means.

An undercover officer invited Laudenberg for coffee at a Torrance restaurant. After discussing various topics, Laudenberg walked away leaving his cup behind. Another officer swept in and got the cup, from which DNA samples were extracted and sent for testing; they matched seminal fluid found on Lois Petrie's corpse. Armed with this evidence, authorities tracked down Laudenberg's camper van and arrested him, holding him on a $1,000,000 bail. He was charged with Petrie's murder. Despite his statements declaring his innocence, he was found guilty of the Petrie killing and sentenced to life imprisonment.

The circumstances surrounding how the officers obtained the DNA sample raised some privacy issues, with police arguing that discarded items were considered public property, and therefore no legal permission was required to get a sample. The appellate court upheld the conviction, rejecting Laudenberg's argument that the expectation was that a restaurant employee would have thrown the cup out.

== See also ==
- List of serial killers in the United States
