= San Pedro High School =

Coordinates: 33.729436°N 118.299205°W

San Pedro Senior High School
- 1001 West 15th Street; San Pedro, California 90744; United States

Information
- Type: Public
- Motto: "Wisdom, Integrity and Self-Respect"
- Established: 1903
- Dean: John Bobich, Denise Marovich-Sampson
- Principal: Raymond Aubele
- Faculty: 117.13 (FTE)
- Enrollment: 2,398 (2024-2025)
- Student to teacher ratio: 20.47
- Colors: Black and Gold
- Athletics conference: Marine League; CIF Los Angeles City Section
- Mascot: Pirate Pete & YoHo the Parrot
- Nickname: Pirates
- Newspaper: Fore N Aft
- Yearbook: Black and Gold
- Phone: (310) 241-5800
- Website: sanpedrohs.lausd.org

San Pedro High School is a public high school in the Los Angeles Unified School District and is located in the San Pedro portion of the city of Los Angeles, California. The school serves the entirety of San Pedro as well as most of the Eastview neighborhood of Rancho Palos Verdes. The base housing of the Los Angeles Space Force Base is assigned to this school.

In 2003, the school celebrated its 100th anniversary.

== History ==
It was in the Los Angeles City High School District until 1961, when it merged into LAUSD.

In 1971, each Parent Teacher Association meeting had about 24 participants on a regular basis, even though the organization had 1,170 members.

During a campus renovation that began in 2022, researchers and construction crews uncovered a massive marine fossil bed with more than 200 species, including megalodon, shorebirds, sea turtles and saber-tooth salmon..

== Facilities ==
San Pedro High School is home to two protected landmarks, the Administration Building and Language Arts Building. Both were constructed in 1936 under mandate from the Works Progress Administration. San Pedro High School also has a Mathematics and Sciences Building, a Vocational Arts Building, a cafeteria, numerous bungalow-style classrooms, and three gymnasiums.

The school and its surroundings were the area where much of the filming for the 1987 movie Some Kind of Wonderful was shot.

== Demographics ==
As of the school year 2008-09, the racial breakdown included:

- 67.1% Hispanic
- 19.0% White
- 9.8% African American
- 0.7% Native American
- 3.5% Asian
- 0.5% Pacific Islander

== Notable alumni ==
- Alan Ashby, 1969, former catcher in the Houston Astros, now a sportscaster.
- John Bettis, lyricist
- Mister Cartoon, 1969, graffiti and tattoo artist
- Misty Copeland, Principal Ballet Dancer for the American Ballet Theatre
- Mario Danelo, 2003, NCAA placekicker
- Eric Erlandson, 1981, co-founder and lead guitarist for 1990s rock/grunge band Hole.
- Anna Lee Fisher, 1967, first mother in space, 1984 crew member of Space Shuttle Discovery
- Brian Harper, 1977, former Major League Baseball Player.
- D. L. Hughley, actor and comedian
- Ed Jurak, MLB utility infielder for the Red Sox, Giants and Athletics 1982-1989
- Yuri Kochiyama, civil rights activist
- Otis Livingston, 1985, sportscaster and sideline reporter
- Garry Maddox, 1968, former MLB player
- Haven Moses, NFL wide receiver
- Willie Naulls, 1952, former NBA player
- John Olguin, 1941, director of the Cabrillo Marine Aquarium
- Art Pepper, jazz alto saxophonist
- Miguel Jontel Pimentel, 2003, singer, won the Grammy for best R&B song in 2013.
- C. Waldo Powers, 1918, architect behind many historic Los Angeles apartment houses
- Don Shinnick, 1952, NFL linebacker and coach
- Mike Watt, D. Boon and George Hurley, 1976, members of punk band Minutemen.
- Brenton Wood, 1963, Songwriter, singer, "Gimme Little Sign", "The Oogum Boogum Song".
