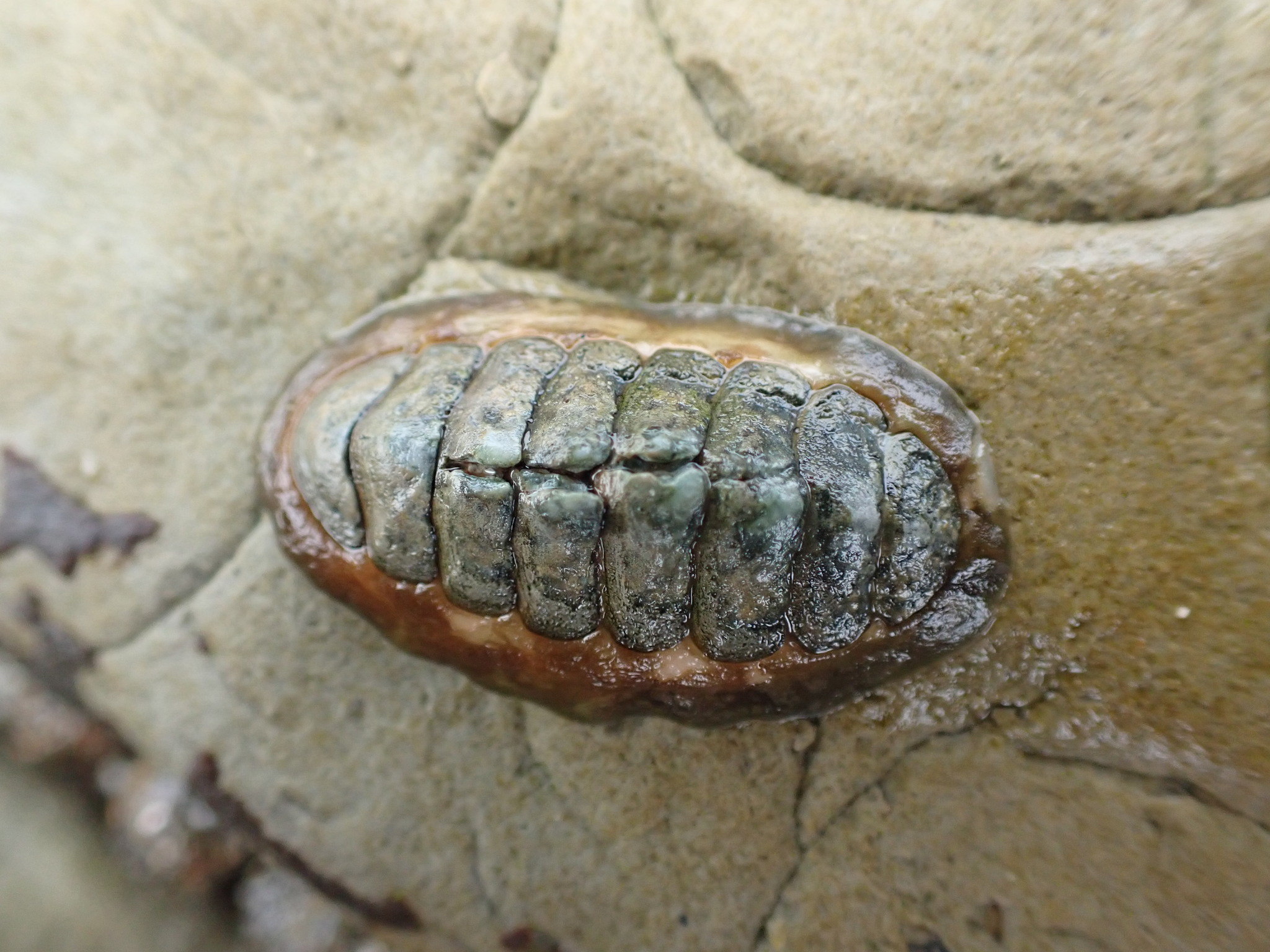
- Hartweg's chiton, Santa Cruz County, California, 2020

Scientific classification
- Kingdom: Animalia
- Phylum: Mollusca
- Class: Polyplacophora
- Order: Chitonida
- Family: Lepidochitonidae
- Genus: Cyanoplax
- Species: C. hartwegii

Binomial name
- Cyanoplax hartwegii (Carpenter, 1855)

Synonyms
- Lepidochitona hartwegii (Carpenter, 1855)

= Cyanoplax hartwegii =

Species of mollusc

Cyanoplax hartwegii is a species of chiton in the family Lepidochitonidae.

== Description ==
Cyanoplax hartwegii can reach a length of about 30.8 millimetres (1.21 in). These chiton are red-brown, with dark gray girdle. The surface of the valves is commonly grayish green with dark markings.

== Distribution and habitat ==
This species is present in Eastern Pacific (Alaska, Mexico and USA). These molluscs live in intertidal to shallow subtidal zones
