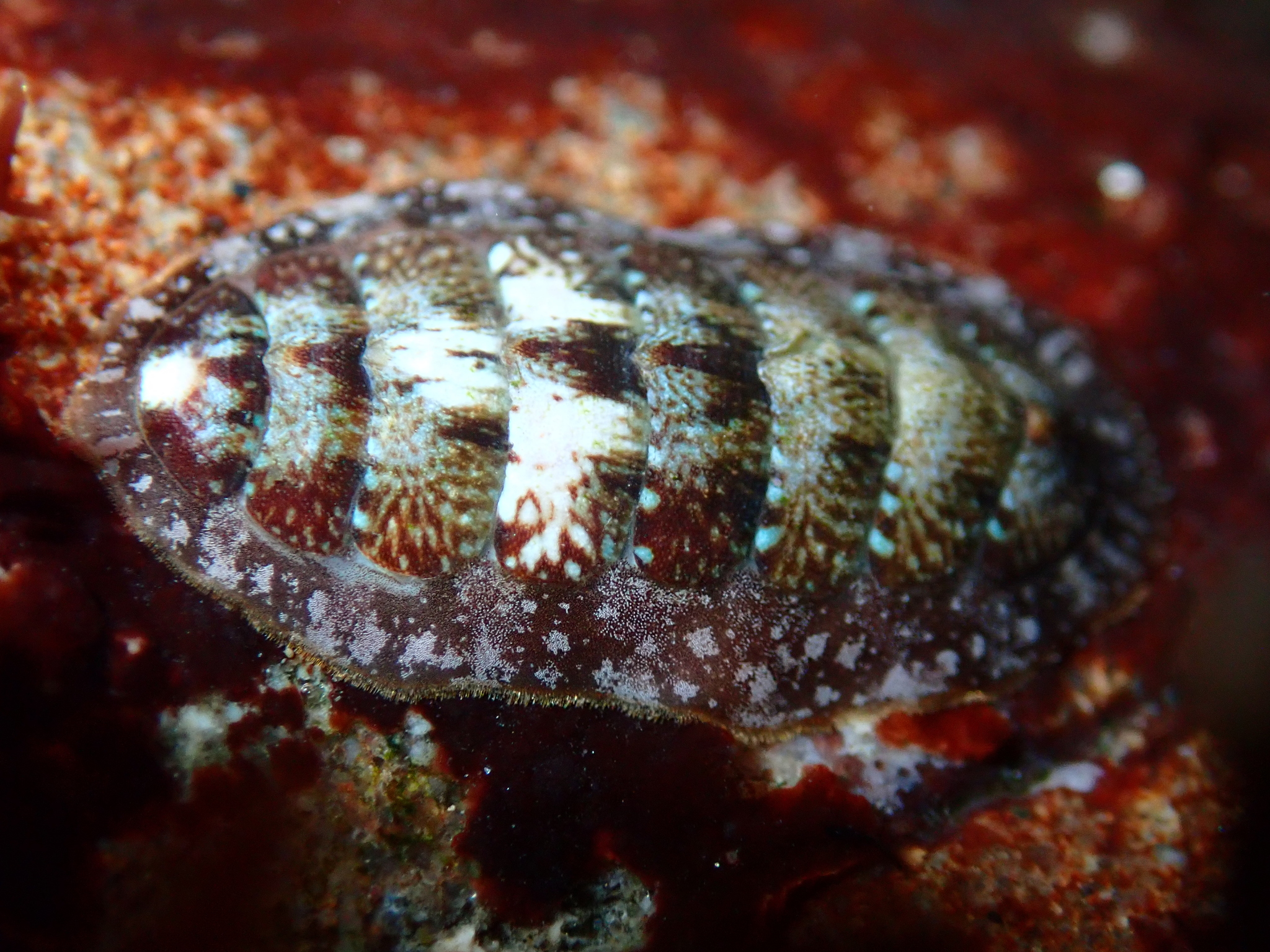
- Cyanoplax dentiens, Pescadero, California, 2026

Scientific classification
- Kingdom: Animalia
- Phylum: Mollusca
- Class: Polyplacophora
- Order: Chitonida
- Family: Lepidochitonidae
- Genus: Cyanoplax
- Species: C. dentiens

Binomial name
- Cyanoplax dentiens Dall, 1879

Synonyms
- Chiton dentiens A. A. Gould, 1846; Cyanoplax dentiens cryptica Kues, 1974; Lepidochitona dentiens (A. A. Gould, 1846); Trachydermon (Cyanoplax) raymondi Pilsbry, 1894; Trachydermon dentiens (A. A. Gould, 1846); Trachydermon pseudodentiens P. P. Carpenter, 1864; Trachydermon raymondi Pislbry, 1894

= Cyanoplax dentiens =

Species of mollusc

Cyanoplax dentiens, commonly known as the Gould's baby chiton, is a species of chiton found on the sides of intertidal boulders, typically 1 m or more above the 0.0 tide level, from Alaska to La Jolla, San Diego.

== Description ==
Gould's baby chiton is one of the most abundant chitons along the west coast of the United States, north of Point Conception, CA, but it is often overlooked due to its small size and inconspicuous coloration. The chiton is no larger than 2.7 cm in length. It is most commonly greenish-gray to brown in color, although this may vary significantly. In fact, the species so well known for its phenotypic variation that some taxonomic guides suggest you may rule out C. dentiens if all the individuals you collect display the same coloration.

== Reproduction ==
Gould's baby chiton is reproductively active during the winter and spring. Although other species of Cyanoplax brood their young, C. dentiens release their eggs directly into the water column where they hatch into free-swimming larvae that later settle and metamorphose into adult chitons.
