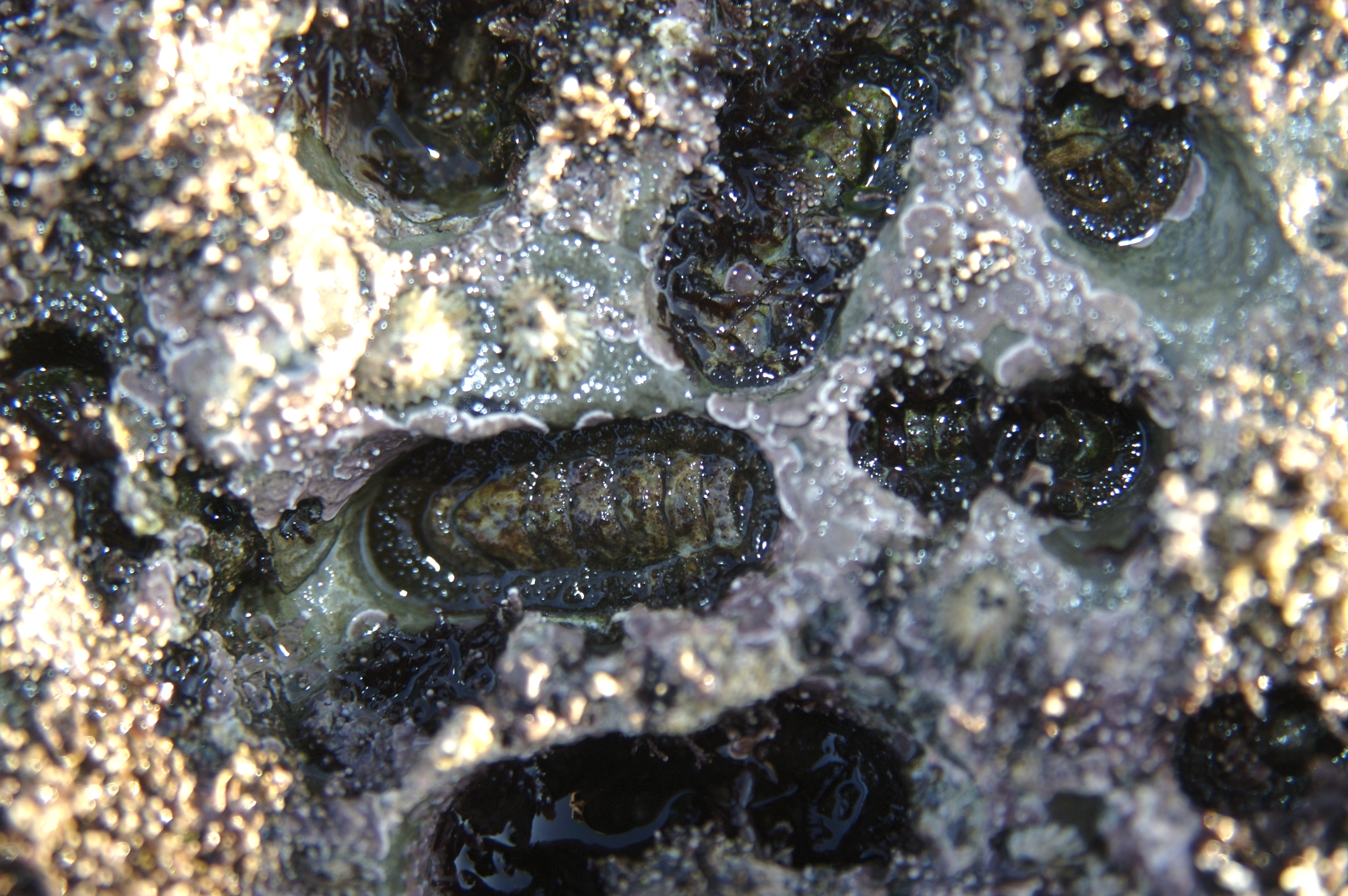
- Nuttallina californica

Scientific classification
- Domain: Eukaryota
- Kingdom: Animalia
- Phylum: Mollusca
- Class: Polyplacophora
- Order: Chitonida
- Family: Lepidochitonidae
- Genus: Nuttallina; Dall, 1871

= Nuttallina =

Genus of molluscs

Nuttallina is a genus of chitons belonging to the family Lepidochitonidae.

The species of this genus are found in the waters of western North America.

== Species ==
The following species are recognised in the genus Nuttallina:

- Nuttallina alternata (Sowerby, 1840)
- Nuttallina californica (Reeve, 1847)
- Nuttallina crossota Berry, 1956
