= C. Waldo Powers =

American architect

- Born: Charles Waldo Powers Jr. April 12, 1900; San Pedro, California, U.S.
- Died: June 27, 1932 (aged 32); Los Angeles County, California, U.S.
- Education: San Pedro High School; California Institute of Technology
- Occupation: Architect
- Years active: 1926-1930

C. Waldo Powers (April 12, 1900 – June, 27, 1932) was an American architect who designed a large number of apartment buildings in the 1920s.

== Early life ==
Born in San Pedro, California, Waldo was the son of Charles Powers — a Swedish immigrant — and Mercy Crocker. He grew up in San Pedro, California, where he attended San Pedro High School. He then went to the California Institute of Technology in Pasadena, where he played football and graduated with a degree in engineering in 1922.

== Architectural work ==
Between 1926 and 1930, Powers designed many of the iconic apartment buildings that still stand all over Los Angeles. They include:

- Alvertone Apts. (437–443 Hartford Ave.)
- Armitage Apts. (545 S. Hobart Blvd.)
- Arwyn Manor Apts. (3835 W. 8th St.)
- Avalon Apts. (324 S. Catalina St.)
- Beaconsfield Manor (320 S. Manhattan Pl.)
- Beaumont Manor (610 S. Coronado St.)
- Belton Apts. (730 S. Catalina St.)
- Camillas Apts. (862 S. Catalina St.)
- Coronado Apts. (746 S. Coronado St.)
- Eleanor Apts. (412 S. Lake St.)
- Ellington Apts. (814 S. Hobart Blvd.)
- Fox Normandie Apts. (849 S. Normandie Ave.)
- Harvard Manor (854 S. Harvard Blvd.)
- Herbert Arms (2850 Leeward Ave.)
- Kiora Apts. (437 Hartford Ave.)
- Las Palmas Apts. (147 S. Normandie Ave.)
- Marino Apts. (2743 San Marino St.)
- Millmar Apts. (510 S. Kenmore Ave.)
- Mulvey Apts. (441 S. Hartford Ave.)
- Norwell Apts. (304 S. Manhattan Pl.)
- Pandora Apts. (744 S. Catalina St.)
- President Apts. (669 S. Union Ave.)
- Serrano Towers (511 S. Serrano St.)
- Shellbourne Apts. (728 S. Berendo St.)
- St. Andrews Manor (516 S. St. Andrews Pl.)
- St. Marlieu Apts. (856 S. Catalina St.)

== Death ==
Powers died of an infection after a brief illness in June 1932; he was just 32. He was survived by his parents; his wife, Ethel; and three children: Patricia, Leatrice, and Charles Jr.
