= The Sunken City =

Unofficial tourist attraction in Los Angeles

Coordinates: 33.705°N 118.289°W

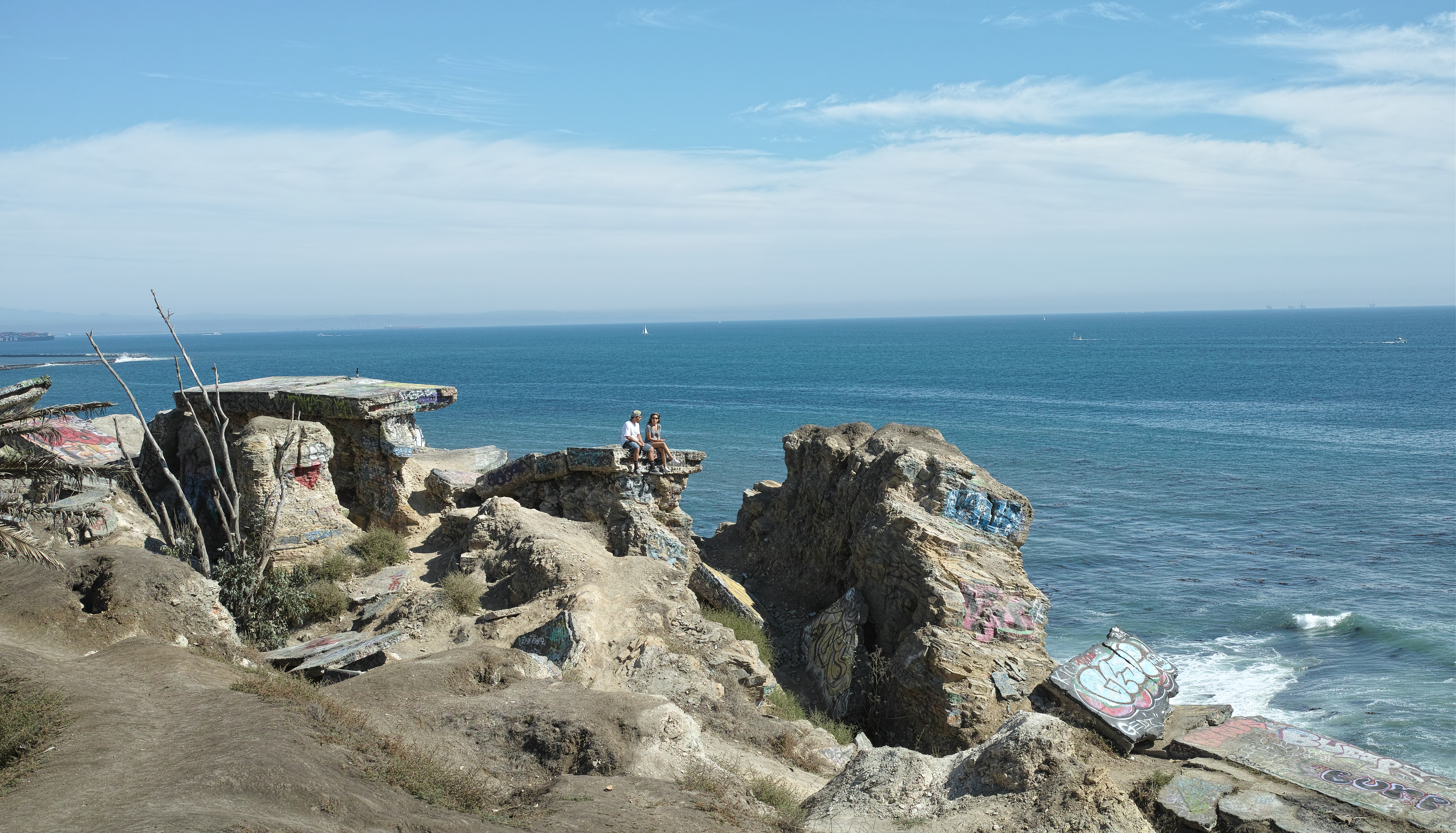
The Sunken City in 2014

The Sunken City is the site of a natural landslide that occurred in the Point Fermin area of the San Pedro neighborhood of Los Angeles, beginning in 1929. A slump caused several beachside homes to slide into the ocean. The area was originally developed in the 1920s by George H. Peck, featuring homes with views of the Pacific Ocean. Experts investigating the landslide said that the ground was shifting at a rate of 11 inches (280 mm) per day. The landslide occurred at the southern tip of San Pedro, sending nearly 40,000 square feet (3,700 m^{2}) into the Pacific Ocean. The area is still visited by sightseers, though access is legally forbidden. Despite this, trespassing laws are rarely enforced, and Sunken City has become a popular destination for locals and tourists.

== Overview ==
Selected locations near Point Fermin in San Pedro, California
- Points of interest
- Parks and open spaces
1 Korean Bell of Friendship
2 Cabrillo Beach
3 Point Fermin Light
4 The Sunken City

The Sunken City is on Point Fermin at the southern end of San Pedro, adjacent to seaside parks near the Point Fermin Light. Sunken City's street address is 500 W. Paseo Del Mar, San Pedro, CA, 90731. Sunken City overlooks the Pacific Ocean and contains remnants of concrete foundations, curbs, sanitation systems, and piping from the once-inhabited neighborhood on the San Pedro cliff. It is one of the only landslide areas along the coastline of San Pedro that remains closed to the public. However, as the graveyard of a San Pedro neighborhood, it has also become an attraction, drawing tourists and locals alike.

Local interest in Sunken City has prompted some residents of the Point Fermin area to request that the City of Los Angeles Department of Recreation and Parks open the area, claiming that it has been stable for many years now. The head of the Sunken City Watch group has also supported public access to the area. Advocates sought a legal opinion, hiring the Hermosa Beach law firm of Chatten-Brown & Carstens LLP. It was determined that the city would face little to no liability if the area was open to access. Despite this, if caught trespassing, violators can face a hefty fine of up to a $1000. Illegal access is gained through a small hole in the fence that separates the public from the hiking trail that leads to the attraction. It can also be accessed by climbing the fence. The main reason Sunken City has not been opened to public access is the continued history of deaths and injuries at Sunken City and areas near it (see § Incidents) resulting from trespassing past the gate and hiking the area.

However, the area around Sunken City remains unsafe due to ongoing, albeit less severe, land movements compared to the initial 1929 landslide. In recent years multiple landslides have caused major cracks in adjacent highways. In 2011, a roadway crumbled into pieces and fell into gaping holes near the White Point Nature Preserve in San Pedro, and part of the roadway descended into the ocean. In Rancho Palos Verdes, an area approximately 4 miles (6.4 km) west along the coast from Sunken City beach, an estimated $500,000 per year is spent in repairs to stabilize land that is constantly moving and dropping off into the ocean. The City of Los Angeles's engineers and political representatives are conflicted about whether to spend public money to replace the part of Paseo Del Mar destroyed at Sunken City, or to leave it as a memorial of the disaster.

=== Geographical factors ===
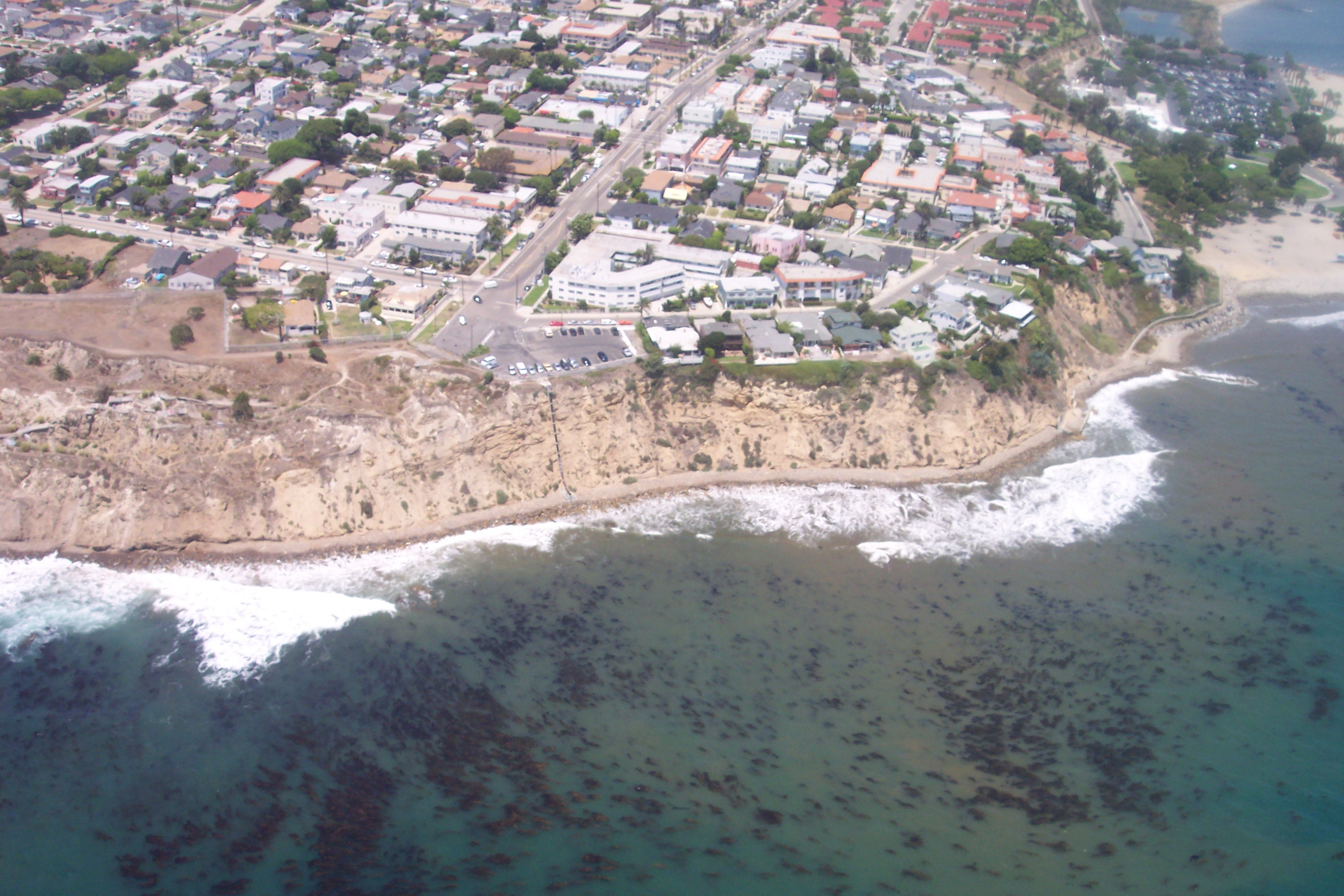
The San Pedro neighborhood that surrounds the site of the Sunken City landslide shows how the lost neighborhood's road had previously been connected.

The steep cliffs and loose rocks are the reason that the Sunken City beach remains fenced off from the public. The geographical composition of the land makes it potentially hazardous to people's safety, even if people are experienced in hiking or other outdoor activities.

In coastal California, landslides are common due to an active tectonic environment. Some geologists have identified the name for landslides that push land into the ocean as a "slump." Landslides tend to be more common in places where rocks are weak and slopes are steep, which is how most of the coastal areas in Southern California are structured. The Paseo Del Mar neighbourhood was a perfect example of this geographical issue. Waves undercutting the cliff caused water to seep into the bentonite layer of the cliff. Bentonite is a form of absorbent clay formed by the breakdown of volcanic ash. The ash layer became waterlogged, destabilising the cliff.

After the landslide disaster, geologists looked into the Fermin Point land structure and found very little record of geotechnical inspection or investigation. There were no geologic or soil reports regarding instabilities within the site, which means that no proper research was done to determine whether it was safe to build a community on the grounds.

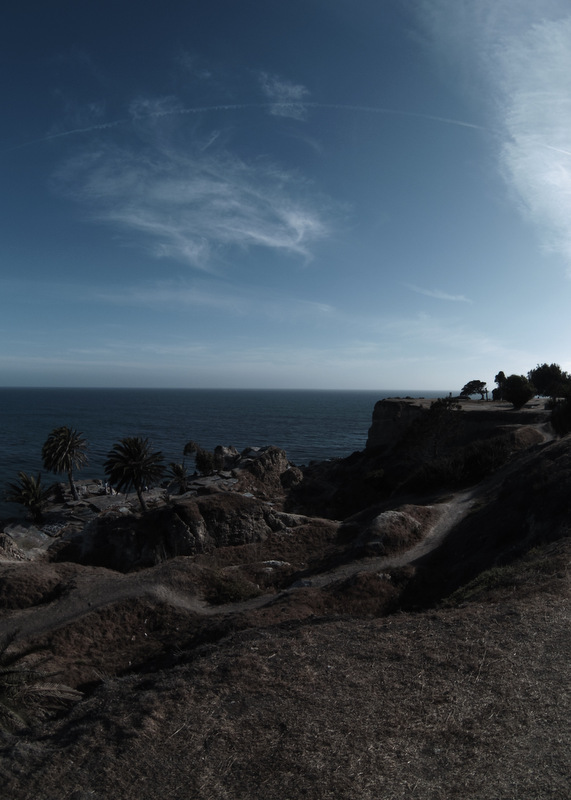
The cliffs of the Sunken City

=== Surrounding attractions ===
While Sunken City is one of the major attractions in San Pedro, other nearby historic areas also draw the public. Point Fermin Park, which includes a large park of green meadows that lead to the Point Fermin Lighthouse, is a short walk west of Sunken City. In addition, the Korean Friendship Bell, which was donated by Korea to the United States in 1976, is just north of Point Fermin Park.

== History ==
=== Gradual landslide ===
The first reports of damage occurred on January 2, 1929, when a water line broke underneath the Ocean View Inn hotel on Paseo Del Mar. A gas line broke on January 10 under the same building. The crack first became visible in early April after heavy rains. It was reported the crack took a semicircular route, from the east end of Point Fermin Park, across Paseo del Mar, through the center of the block south of Shepard Street and east of Carolina Street, then back toward the ocean bluff just west of Pacific Avenue; approximately ten houses were within the area bounded by the crack.

On May 18, 1929, the Los Angeles Times reported more information about the pending landslide, describing it as a crack that resulted in a deep hole ten feet long and three feet across in front of one of the houses. The San Pedro News-Pilot was more dismissive, believing the crack to be caused by water "washing out a soft clay stratum that caused a slide of the earth above it" on the advice of geologists and concluded "when the source of the leak in water or drainage pipes that caused the slide at Point Fermin is discovered the cause will be removed, the cracks filled up and the danger forgotten." Nevertheless, the Board of Public Works advised residents to evacuate.

Land owners endorsed a plan to have the city condemn their properties and purchase them to form a park; the city responded the crack would be surveyed weekly to measure its progression. Owners representing 35 of the 39 lots affected by the crack had signed a petition to have the city purchase their properties by September. By December, the crack had opened to between 2 and 12 feet (0.61 and 3.66 m) wide, although the city had refilled the crack to continue to use Carolina Street.

The crack continued to widen in the 1930s and early 1940s. In 1935, the slip was thought to have stopped. By April 1940, the bluff was noted to be moving at a rate of 1 inch per day (0.29 mm/ks) towards the ocean, and Paseo del Mar had been severed across the crack, with seven families cut off on the sinking bluff. An earthquake in early 1941 was not thought to have affected the slide, but continued rains had widened the crack by another 8 feet (2.4 m) between January 31 and February 17; during the drier summer months, the slip was only 10 inches (250 mm) in two months.

Eventually the crack caved in 5 acres (2.0 ha) and caused breaks in gas and water lines throughout the neighborhood. Most of the houses on the 600 block of Paseo Del Mar were evacuated and relocated before the collapse. There was not enough time to move two houses, which ultimately slid into the ocean. Part of the adjoining Point Fermin Park also fell. The slide displaced houses, commercial buildings, streets, and sidewalks.

In the years after the 1929 landslide, Sunken City was abandoned and known only to locals.

=== Public access proposals ===
In 1989 there was a plan to open up the surrounding area so that the community could have regulated recreational access through a developed nature trail. This plan was supposed to be enacted with the installment of the wrought iron fence that now restricts the area. The plan was proposed by then-City Councilwoman Joan Milke Flores, however, the design for adding the gates to the fence was never implemented. In addition, the original plans to open Sunken City to public recreational access seemed to have been lost and forgotten, but with the new proposal being presented by Joe Buscaino, the Coastal Commission has begun a search for the original proposal.

In May 2015, fans of the off-limit beach conducted an online petition asking for the public opening of Sunken City. The petitioners asked for the opening of the beach during daylight hours and policing by night, adding lighting, cameras, and ticketing to maintain safety. Director Martin Scorsese has been a vocal advocate for opening the beach up to the public. San Pedro's City Councilman Joe Buscaino has put forward a proposition for opening the area for the public to enjoy without the risk of being fined by the police. Buscaino's proposal would involve keeping the large wrought iron fence. However, the proposal would require the park officials to install a gate in the fence that would mechanically close and bar off the area at sunset.

Councilman Buscaino's argues that many other coastline areas are open to the public. The main concern against opening is potential liability for visitors' injuries. While Buscaino has been a vocal advocate, there is no set timeline. Furthermore, even though Buscaino's plan would keep the fence up, many argue that the fence serves no purpose, as they claim that today people who have an interest in exploring the area either crawl under the fence or simply walk down the cliff-side of the area to avoid the fence.

=== Incidents ===
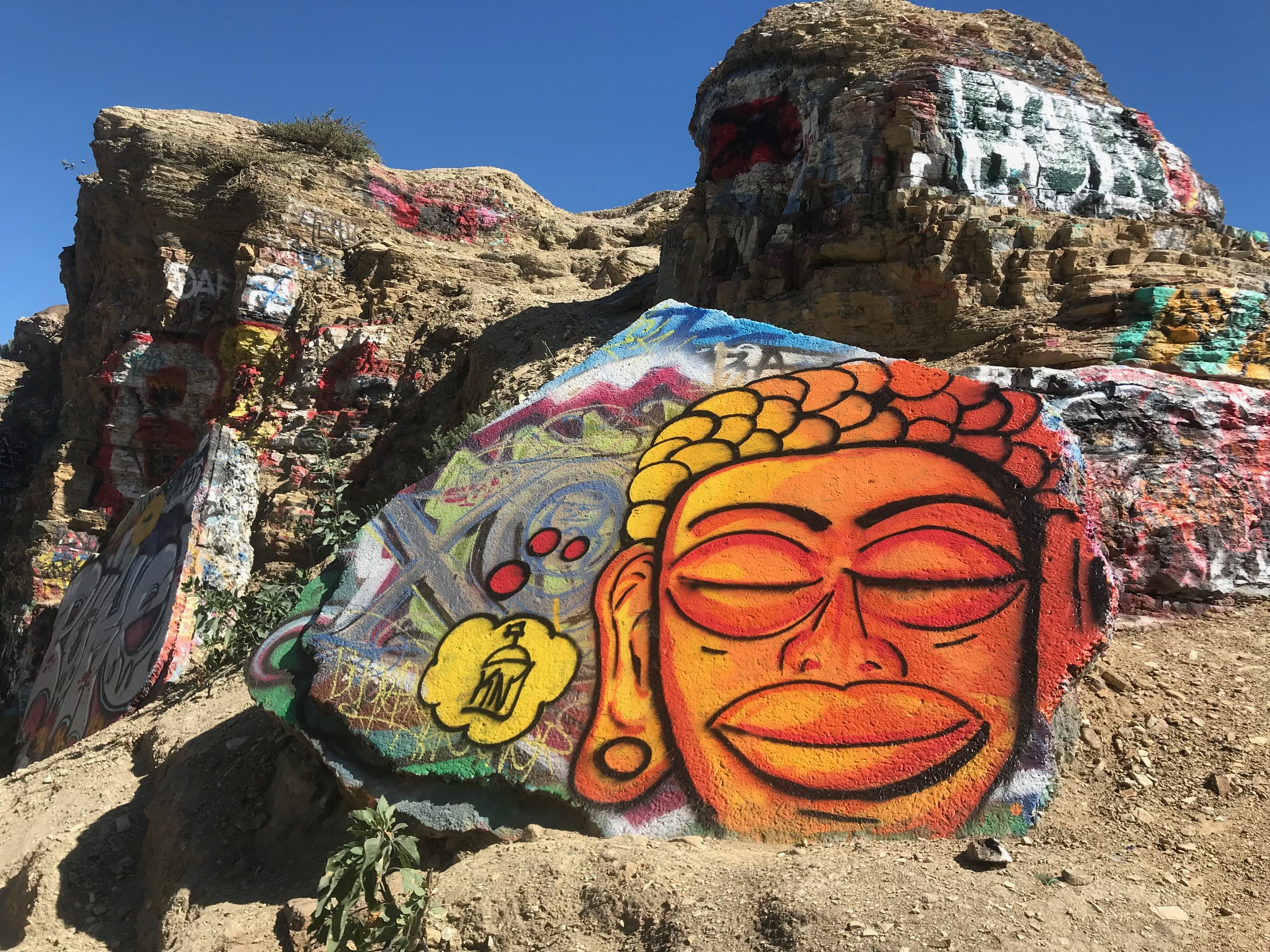
Graffiti at the site

Sunken City has had a long history of incidents. The area is fenced off and technically not open to the public. In 1982, a teenager fell from the cliffs of Sunken City while trying to escape from the police, who were rounding up trespassers within the area. In 1986, local residents filed complaints, reporting people sneaking into the restricted area and having loud parties after hours. The residents also reported gang activity, including vandalism and theft. These incidents and others led to the replacement of the chain-link fence with a more permanent wrought iron fence, installed in 1987. The cost of the new fence was more than US$200,000 and it was thought that it would finally solve trespassing problems.

However, incidents continue to occur even with the sturdier fence in place. In 2003, there were five cliffside deaths, two of which happened within a three-day span. In 2006, four people fell or threw themselves from the cliffs onto the rocks below and died. In January 2007, Mario Danelo, a kicker on the USC football team, fell more than 100 feet (30 m) from the cliffs to his death. In the same year, 19-year-old Megan Maynard lost her footing on unstable rocks and plunged more than 50 feet (15 m) to her death at Sunken City. Three more people died in the same year from falls from the cliffs. In 2013, a woman was found dead by the Sunken City area. That same year a 10-year-old girl suffered head injuries from falling off the cliff. In July 2015, a woman fell 20 feet from one of the cliffs and was injured.

== In popular culture ==
As the word about Sunken City spread, the beach began to gain a presence on social media and online websites. Sunken City beach has its own Facebook page where people form a sort of community of fans. The Facebook page has photos, information, maps, and videos of the beach shared by people enjoyed their experiences at Sunken City. The "sunkencity" hashtag on Instagram has over 19,000 tags. Businesses in San Pedro have named their businesses after the beach because it has become a tourist attraction.

In other media:

- 1998: The critically acclaimed film The Big Lebowski filmed the scene of the scattering of Donny's ashes in The Sunken City.
- 2003: The ending scene of the film National Security was filmed at the Sunken City.
- 2012: The film Sunken City told the story of a San Pedro police officer assigned to an investigation at the site after a woman's dead body washes ashore.
- 2014: "Catalina Fight Song" by Californian punk rock band Joyce Manor on their album Never Hungover Again references the Sunken City in its opening lyrics, "Sunken City by the ocean/You can teach the seventh grade".
- 2015: Sunken City also featured in "The Good Man", the season 1 finale of the series Fear The Walking Dead,
- 2018: The location was featured in Melissa F. Olson's urban fantasy novel Shadow Hunt.
- 2020: The Sunken City was featured in Tim Powers's novel Forced Perspectives.
