= Cabrillo Beach =

Public beach in Los Angeles, California

- Beach
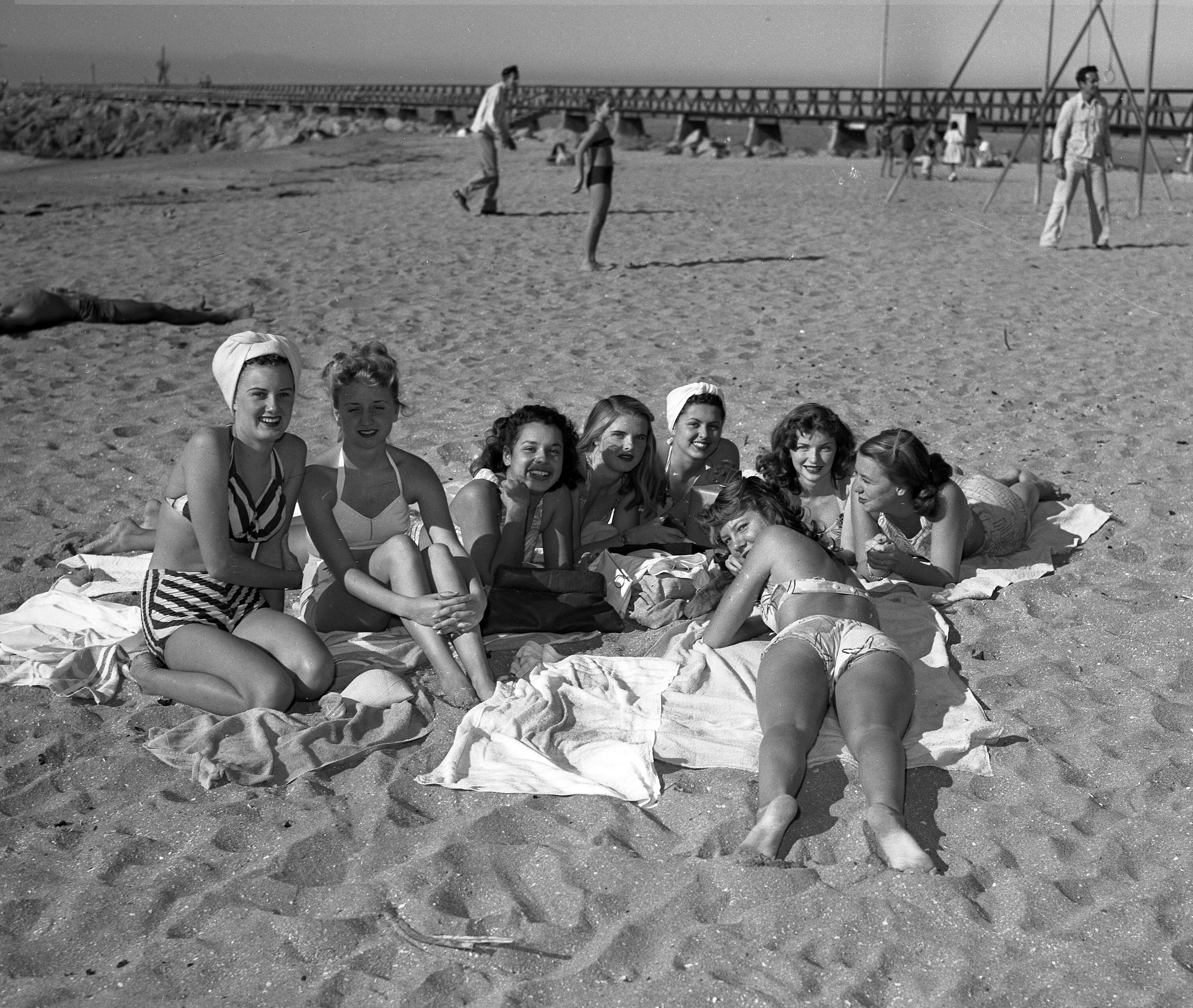
- Cabrillo Beach (1947): beachgoers and breakwater jetty in background to historic Angels Gate Lighthouse
- Interactive map of Cabrillo Beach
- Coordinates: 33.711°N 118.284°W
- Water bodies: Port of Los Angeles; Pacific Ocean
- Age: 1927; 99 years ago
- Formed by: depositing dredged sand

Area
  - Total: 370 acres (150 ha)

Cabrillo Beach is a historic public beach located in San Pedro, Los Angeles, California. It is named after Juan Rodríguez Cabrillo, a Spanish explorer who was the first to sail up the California coast. Cabrillo has two separate beach areas.

== History ==
Cabrillo Beach is a historic beach situated within the small coastal community of San Pedro. Cabrillo Beach is named after Juan Rodriguez Cabrillo, who was the first European to sail along the coast of California. The city of San Pedro was in consideration of being the host of a major port in Southern California. After much deliberation, the federal government selected San Pedro. Construction of the San Pedro Breakwater began in 1899 for the purpose of protecting San Pedro Bay and the new, major port. Rocks from Catalina Island, 25.1 miles (40.4 km) away from the coast of San Pedro, were originally used in the construction of the breakwater. However, due to many problems and set-backs, rocks from Chatsworth, California, were transported to San Pedro for the construction of the breakwater. Some of the rocks used weighed about 6,000 to 16,000 pounds (2,700 to 7,300 kg). In 1913, Angel's Gate Lighthouse was built at the end of the breakwater, which was, and still is today, the main entrance to the Port of Los Angeles.

The ocean water traveled right up to the cliffs; there was no sand between the cliffs of San Pedro and the ocean. So after completion of the breakwater, sand was added in 1927 in order to create the outer beach. The addition of sand was from the harbor dredging. As a result of the addition of sand, the expansive outer beach of Cabrillo was created. Cabrillo Beach opened in 1928, and residents of San Pedro, Wilmington, and Los Angeles flooded to it to enjoy the new Southern California beach. The San Pedro city leaders were excited to have a newly added destination for visitors and residents to enjoy in San Pedro.

== Location ==
Selected locations near Point Fermin in San Pedro, California
- Points of interest
- Parks and open spaces
1 Korean Bell of Friendship
2 Cabrillo Beach
3 Point Fermin Light
4 The Sunken City

Cabrillo Beach is 370 acres (150 ha) of land located at 3720 Stephen M. White Drive San Pedro, California, specifically the Port of Los Angeles West Channel. The beach is on both sides of the eastern point of the Palos Verdes Peninsula. This peninsula is 1.6 miles (2.6 km) long and serves as a breakwater. The inner beach is located within the breakwater where the water is calm. The outer beach is located on the outside of the breakwater, which is where one would find the ocean surf.

== Cabrillo Beach Complex ==
Along with the inner and outer beaches of Cabrillo Beach, the 370 acres (150 ha) of land also encompasses several complexes that are open to the public. The Cabrillo Marine Aquarium is a major complex of Cabrillo Beach. Situated within the parking lot, the aquarium has been teaching the public about the coast and its marine life for over 75 years. An emphasis on education is the main reason for Cabrillo Marine Aquarium's longevity and success. The aquarium has over 90 employees, some full-time and most part-time. The employees are either professional educators, marine biologists, or caretakers for the animals. Along with employees, the aquarium also has 350 volunteers that help aid the aquarium's mission of educating the public and fostering an appreciation of the marine life through special events, monthly coastal clean-ups, and tours.

Overlooking the Los Angeles Harbor is the Cabrillo Beach Fishing Pier. Built in 1969 inside the breakwater, the pier runs 1,200 feet (370 m) parallel with the breakwater. Biking and fishing on the pier is allowed and neither require a license. There is a cover area for shade and washing stations for cleaning up after fishing.

With the pier on the inner beach, the bathhouse is on the outer beach. Originally built in 1932, the bathhouse was declared a historic landmark in 1989 as it was one of the last bathhouses built in Southern California. In the twentieth century, the bathhouse was a place for people to rent beach gear, such as towels and swimsuits, and boats. Overall, the bathhouse offered activities for people to enjoy the inner beach of Cabrillo. The 26,000 square feet (2,400 m^{2}) building was restored on October 12, 2002, and kept its Mediterranean-style structure. Today, the bathhouse has shower rooms, restrooms, life guard facilities, a snack bar, and a community meeting room upstairs.

Just northeast of the bathhouse, across the parking lot, there is the Cabrillo Beach Youth Waterfront Sports Center, which was established in 1946. This complex is an aquatic center for the Southern California youth that exposes them to water safety, rescue methods, care and use of equipment, and physical fitness. Through these activities, the youth develop self-confidence and leadership skills. One company that offer services at this center is Captain Kirk's, which offer wind surfing lessons and rentals for the youth. About 20,000 young people go through the Cabrillo Beach Youth Waterfront Sports Center each year.

== Lifeguards ==
Los Angeles City Lifeguards and Los Angeles County Lifeguards are responsible for the beach and ocean safety in and around the Cabrillo Beach area.

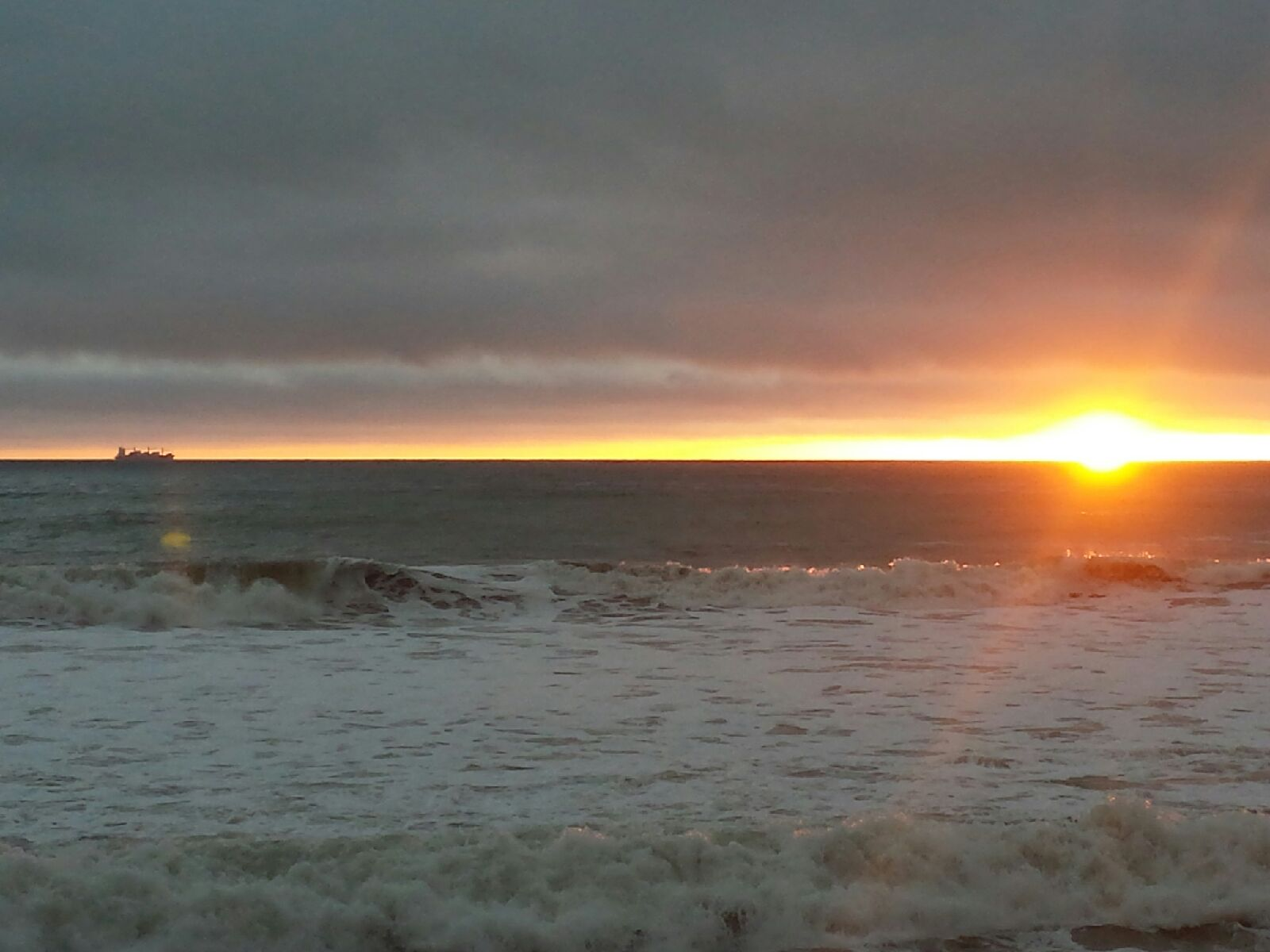
Sunset at Cabrillo Beach in the winter.

== Water sports ==
Cabrillo Beach is a popular destination for those interested in water sports, such as swimming, windsurfing, kitesurfing, kayaking and scuba diving.

Cabrillo Beach is known to "Turn-of-the-Century Sailors" and windsurfers alike as "Hurricane Gulch" because of its predictably strong westerly winds.

== Landmarks ==
It is also home to a few famous landmarks, namely the 1.75 mi (2.82 km) Los Angeles Breakwater which ends at the Angel's Gate Lighthouse, the recently restored Cabrillo Beach Bathhouse, and the Cabrillo Marine Aquarium. The Angels Gate Lighthouse is home to the annual Angel's Gate Lighthouse Swim competition, held by lifeguards and San Pedro residents each summer.
