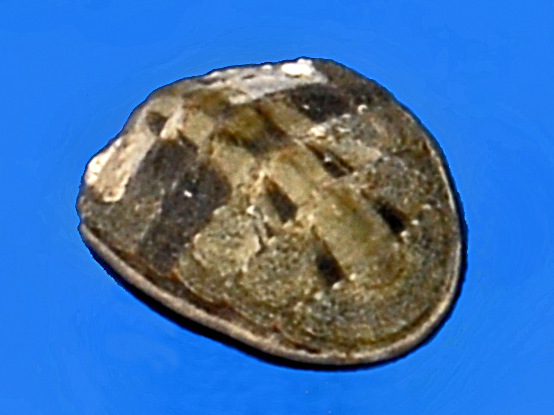
- Cyanoplax hartwegii

Scientific classification
- Kingdom: Animalia
- Phylum: Mollusca
- Class: Polyplacophora
- Order: Chitonida
- Family: Lepidochitonidae
- Genus: Cyanoplax; Pilsbry, 1892

= Cyanoplax =

Genus of molluscs

Cyanoplax is a genus of chitons in the family Tonicellidae. This body type of this genus displays bilateral symmetry and reproduction occurs sexually.

== Species ==
The following species are recognised in the genus Cyanoplax:

- Cyanoplax beanii (Carpenter, 1857)
- Cyanoplax berryana (Eernisse, 1986)
- Cyanoplax caverna (Eernisse, 1986)
- Cyanoplax corteziana (Clark, 2000)
- Cyanoplax cryptica Kues, 1974
- Cyanoplax dentiens (Gould, 1846)
- Cyanoplax fernaldi (Eernisse, 1986)
- Cyanoplax hartwegii (Carpenter, 1855)
- Cyanoplax keepiana (Berry, 1948)
- Cyanoplax lowei (Pilsbry, 1918)
- Cyanoplax thomasi (Pilsbry, 1898)
