= Mario Danelo =

American football player (1985–2007)

- Danelo's USC team photo

No. 19
- Position: Placekicker

Personal information
- Born: July 3, 1985; San Pedro, California, U.S.
- Died: January 6, 2007 (aged 21); San Pedro, California, U.S.
- Listed height: 5 ft 10 in (1.78 m)
- Listed weight: 200 lb (91 kg)

Career information
- High school: San Pedro High School
- College: USC (2003–2006)

Awards and highlights
- AP National Champion (2004); 2007 Rose Bowl champion

Mario Danelo (July 3, 1985 – January 6, 2007) was an American college football placekicker for the University of Southern California.

== Early life ==
Danelo was an all–Los Angeles linebacker at San Pedro High School in San Pedro, California. Danelo was also a fullback and kicker at his high school. Because, at 5'10" and 200 lbs, he was undersized to be a major college linebacker, his father, former 9-year National Football League kicker Joe Danelo, taught him the position. Danelo became the first San Pedro High Pirate to play football at the University of Southern California in 30 years.

== College career ==
Danelo was a walk-on college football player at USC in 2003. He redshirted his first year and did not have any kick attempts in the 2004 season. He earned an athletic scholarship starting in 2005. During the 2005 season, he set the NCAA, Pac-10 and USC season record for hitting 83 out of 86 PATs. In 2006, Danelo led USC in scoring with 89 points. During the 2006 season, Danelo made 15 of 16 field-goal attempts and 44 of 48 PATs. In his final game, the 21-year-old kicked two field goals in helping USC achieve victory in the 2007 Rose Bowl.

== Death and memorial ==
In the early morning hours of January 6, 2007, after partying with friends, Danelo left his family's San Pedro home, telling his father he was going for a walk. He was found dead later that day by a passer-by at the bottom of the 120-foot-tall (37 m) White Point Cliff near Point Fermin Lighthouse, several blocks from his house. No signs of scuba gear, surfing equipment, or swimsuits were found, and his car was not in the vicinity. The police ruled out foul play as the cause of death. In front of the cliff, which he is suspected to have accidentally fallen off or jumped, there are signs forbidding entrance. Danelo's autopsy toxicological report found he had a 0.23 blood-alcohol level at the time of his death, almost three times the California legal limit to operate a vehicle on public roadways. The coroner's report listed the cause of death as the result of "multiple traumatic injuries;" however the coroner could not determine how those injuries had occurred. Danelo's blood tested free from drugs. As of March 2007, the manner of death was undetermined.

Two thousand people attended Danelo's funeral at Mary Star of the Sea Catholic church as city streets in San Pedro were closed to handle traffic and several thousand mourners spilled outside of the filled church. The speakers included his older brother Joey Danelo, USC head coach Pete Carroll, and his San Pedro High coach Mike Walsh. Among the mourners were about 100 of his former USC teammates and coaches, including Shaun Cody, Matt Grootegoed, Fred Matua, Tom Malone, and Scott Ware.

For the 2007 season, USC players wore a #19 sticker on their helmets in honor of Danelo. In addition, the Kennedy-Jones practice field had the number "19" sprayed onto its end zones. The Los Angeles Memorial Coliseum also put a banner above the tunnel with Danelo's name and the goal-post pads paid tribute to him.

Before the beginning of the 2007 opener, USC held a special ceremony with a video tribute, a moment of silence before the game and coach Pete Carroll and Athletic Director Mike Garrett presented a jersey to Danelo's parents. On September 1, 2007, in USC's first game of the season against the Idaho Vandals, USC intentionally lined up for the PAT without a kicker following their first touchdown of the game, taking a 5-yard delay of game in tribute to their late teammate. The moment was chosen by ESPN as one of the Pac-10's Top 10 Moments of BCS Era.

On December 17, 2007, San Pedro High School dedicated a large mural on campus to Danelo. The mural was planned and donated by a USC group and titled "Livin' the Dream" by sports muralist Mike Sullivan.

== See also ==
- List of gridiron football players who died during their careers
