= John Olguin =

American museum curator

John Main Olguin (February 18, 1921 – January 1, 2011) was an American aquarium official who served as the museum director of the Cabrillo Marine Museum, which has since been renamed the Cabrillo Marine Aquarium, from 1949 until 1987, when he became director emeritus. Olguin has been called the "father of recreational whale watching", as he was the founder of the Cabrillo Whalewatch program and a founding member of the American Cetacean Society.

An authorized biography, entitled "An Ocean of Inspiration - The John Olguin Story" detailing John's life is being released October 16, 2011 at the Autumn Sea Fair at Cabrillo Marine Aquarium. The book is co-authored by Dr. Stefan Harzen and Barbara J Brunnick, Ph.D. of the Taras Oceanographic Foundation and Mike Schaadt, the current Director of the Cabrillo Marine Aquarium.

In 2012, a new campus of San Pedro High School, the John M. and Muriel Olguin Campus, was opened and named after Olguin and his wife.

== Early life ==
Olguin was born in San Pedro, California, a port district and neighborhood of Los Angeles, on February 18, 1921. His father, Roy Olguin, had moved to southern California from Mexico in 1910 and married Josie Main, a woman from Long Beach, California, who became Olguin's mother. His ancestry also included some Chumash heritage. Olguin became a lifeguard beginning in 1937.

Olguin graduated from San Pedro High School in 1941. He attempted to enlist in the U.S. Navy and United States Coast Guard at the beginning of World War II, but was rejected by both branches of the military because he wore eyeglasses. He was eventually drafted by the United States Army during World War II, serving from 1943 until 1945. Olguin was stationed throughout the Pacific theater during the war, including the Philippines, New Guinea and Japan. Olguin was a recipient of the Silver Star for his service in the Philippines.

== Cabrillo Marine Aquarium ==
During the 1940s, Olguin began working with William Lloyd, a retired dentist and museum director of the newly opened Cabrillo Marine Museum. Lloyd stepped down from the position in 1949 and Olguin, who was a lifeguard captain at the time, succeeded him as director. He began enrolling in biology courses held at local universities and junior colleges to become more familiar with the exhibitions and science in the museum. Olguin established a number of educational programs, often aimed at school children, during his tenure as director. A new aquarium building, designed by Frank Gehry, was opened in 1981.

Olguin remained either the director or co-director of the Cabrillo Marine Museum until his retirement in 1987. However, he remained active with the museum as its director emeritus. Additionally, Olguin persuaded fishermen from San Pedro to using their fishing boats for whale watching, which led to the creation of Cabrillo Whalewatch. He was also a founding member of the American Cetacean Society coordinated the establishment of the Point Fermin Marine Life Refuge, a California marine state park. The Cabrillo Marine Museum changed its name to the Cabrillo Marine Aquarium in 1993.

In addition to his work with the aquarium and education, Olguin was highly active in other local San Pedro institutions and organizations. Olguin established the San Pedro Independence Day Celebration fireworks show in 1953, as well as the San Pedro Polar Bears Club. Olguin also spearheaded efforts to return the Fresnel lens to the Point Fermin Lighthouse in 2006. The San Pedro Rotary Club honored Olguin as "Citizen of the Millennium" for his work in 2009.

John Olguin died at his home in San Pedro, California, on January 1, 2011, at the age of 89. he was survived by his wife of more than 50 years, artist and philanthropist Muriel Olguin; two daughters, Vi Olguin and Moni Olguin-Patten; son John Cabrillo Olguin; siblings, Leonard Olguin, Albert Olguin, Belia Olguin Smith and Esther Olguin Riggs; and four grandchildren.

A public memorial service attended by more than one thousand people, was held for Olguin at the Cabrillo Marine Aquarium on January 22, 2011. Olguin's widow, Muriel Olguin, received an American flag from the Veterans Advisory Commission during the ceremony. Olguin's red jacket, which he wore during whale watching tours, will now be put on exhibition at the Cabrillo Marine Museum.
