= Cabrillo Marine Aquarium =

Aquarium in Los Angeles, California, US

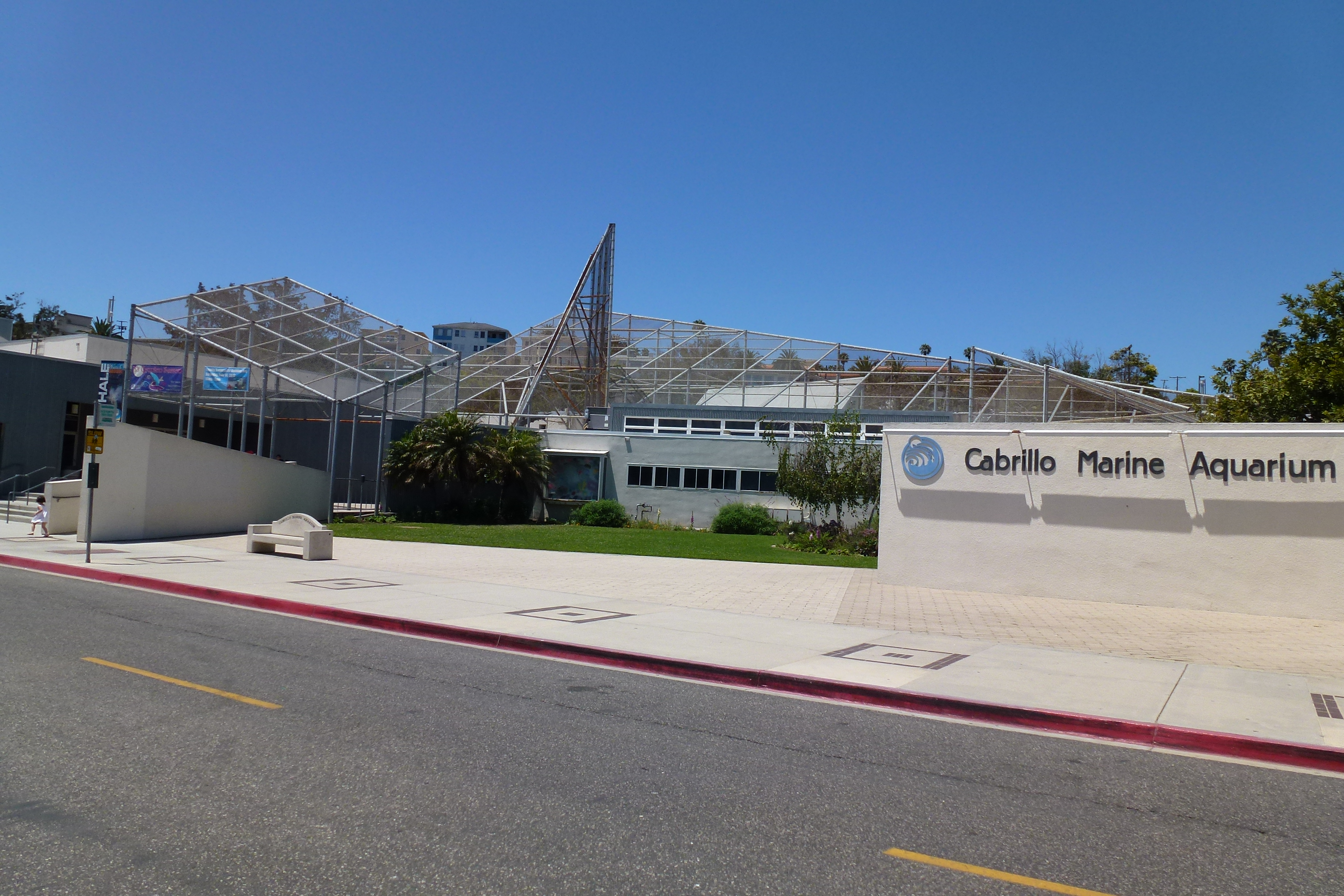
- Main entrance
- Interactive map of Cabrillo Marine Aquarium
- 33.711275°N 118.285453°W
- Date opened: 1935
- Location: San Pedro, California, USA
- Memberships: Association of Zoos and Aquariums
- Website: cma.recreation.parks.lacity.gov

Cabrillo Marine Aquarium is a public aquarium in the San Pedro neighborhood of Los Angeles, California. The aquarium interprets both the physical processes of oceanography and marine biology of Southern California by use of displays and educational programs for the public. The aquarium is operated by the City of Los Angeles Department of Recreation and Parks.

The original building was a small structure that welcomed visitors until there was a move to a much larger structure designed by Frank Gehry in 1981. The 2004 expansion was designed by Barton Phelps & Associates.

== History ==
The aquarium began in 1935 as a collection of marine specimens stored in the Cabrillo Beach Bathhouse. In 1949, John Olguin, captain of the Cabrillo Beach lifeguards, was appointed director of the museum. He popularized the aquarium by giving impromptu tours to visiting school groups as well as starting the popular evening program of viewing and learning about the bizarre grunion mating practices on the beach.

On October 21, 1981, the new $3 million, Frank Gehry–designed museum opened and the old museum closed. Throughout the 1990s, the museum experienced significant growth and in 1993 its name was changed from Cabrillo Marine Museum to the Cabrillo Marine Aquarium to highlight its living collections. It expanded its public programs sector and added an Ocean Outreach Education program, a discovery lab, and a child volunteer program named Sea Rangers. They also created a non-profit, called the Friends of the Cabrillo Marine Aquarium, to assist in funding. In 2004, the facility expanded with an Exploration Center, the S. Mark Taper Foundation Courtyard, an Aquatic Nursery research lab and the Virginia Reed Moore Research Library. In October 2010, it celebrated its 75-year anniversary.

The COVID-19 pandemic hit the aquarium hard, with them losing many staff and members. But throughout the pandemic, while they were closed, they renovated multiple sections of the aquarium.

== Architecture ==
The original one-story, 23,000-square-foot (2,100 m^{2}) facility was designed by Frank Gehry & Associates. It features indoor and outdoor exhibit spaces, an auditorium, wet laboratories and offices around a central open space wrapped in chain-link fencing. Free-standing tanks served by exposed electrical and plumbing systems openly display mechanical functions.

In 2000, Los Angeles commissioned Barton Phelps & Associates to prepare a master plan for a phased expansion. A 21,000-square-foot (2,000 m^{2}) two-story addition houses wet labs, offices, and the Moore Research Library. A fiberglass sculptural screen fronts the expanded complex.

== Gallery ==
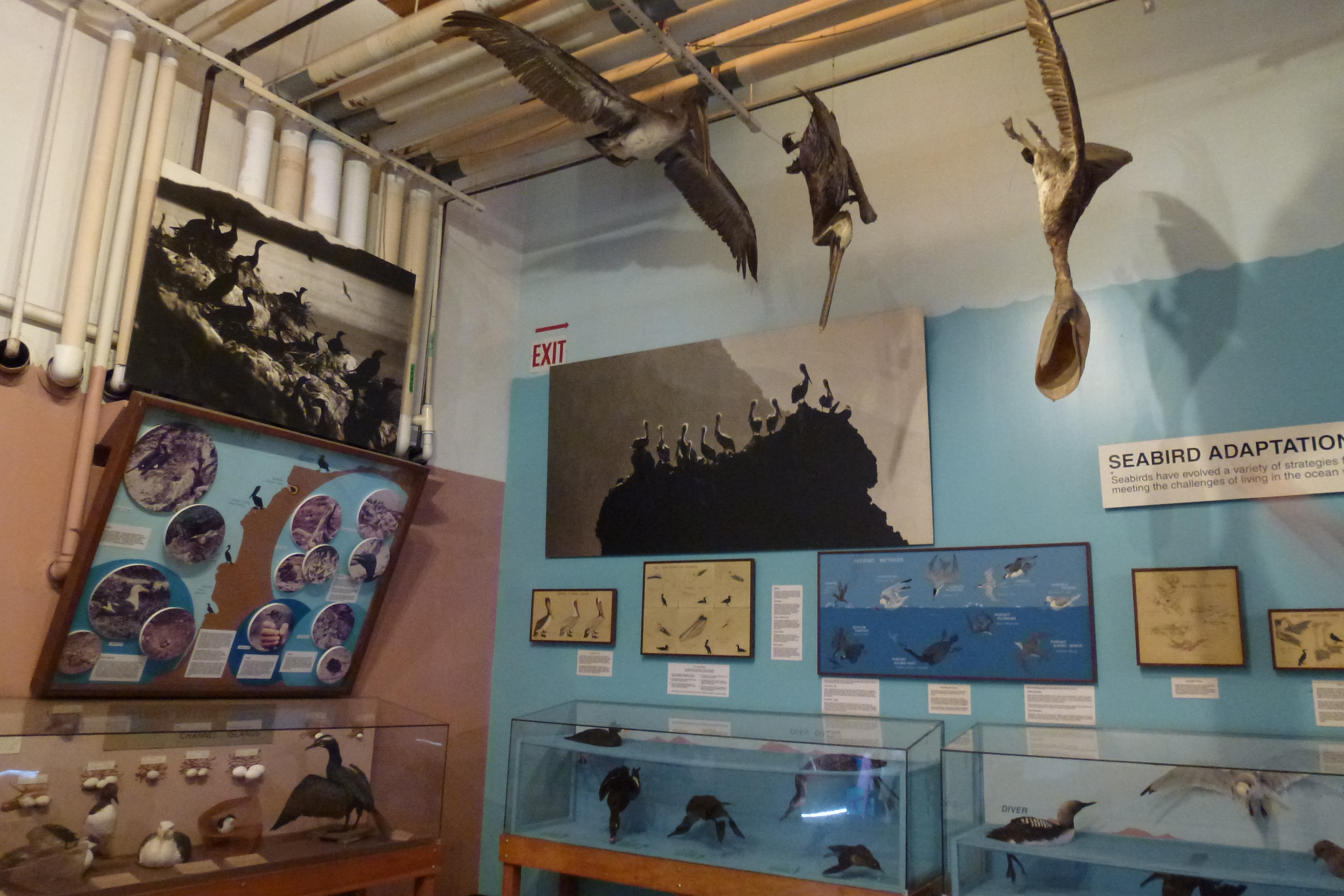
Sea birds on display.

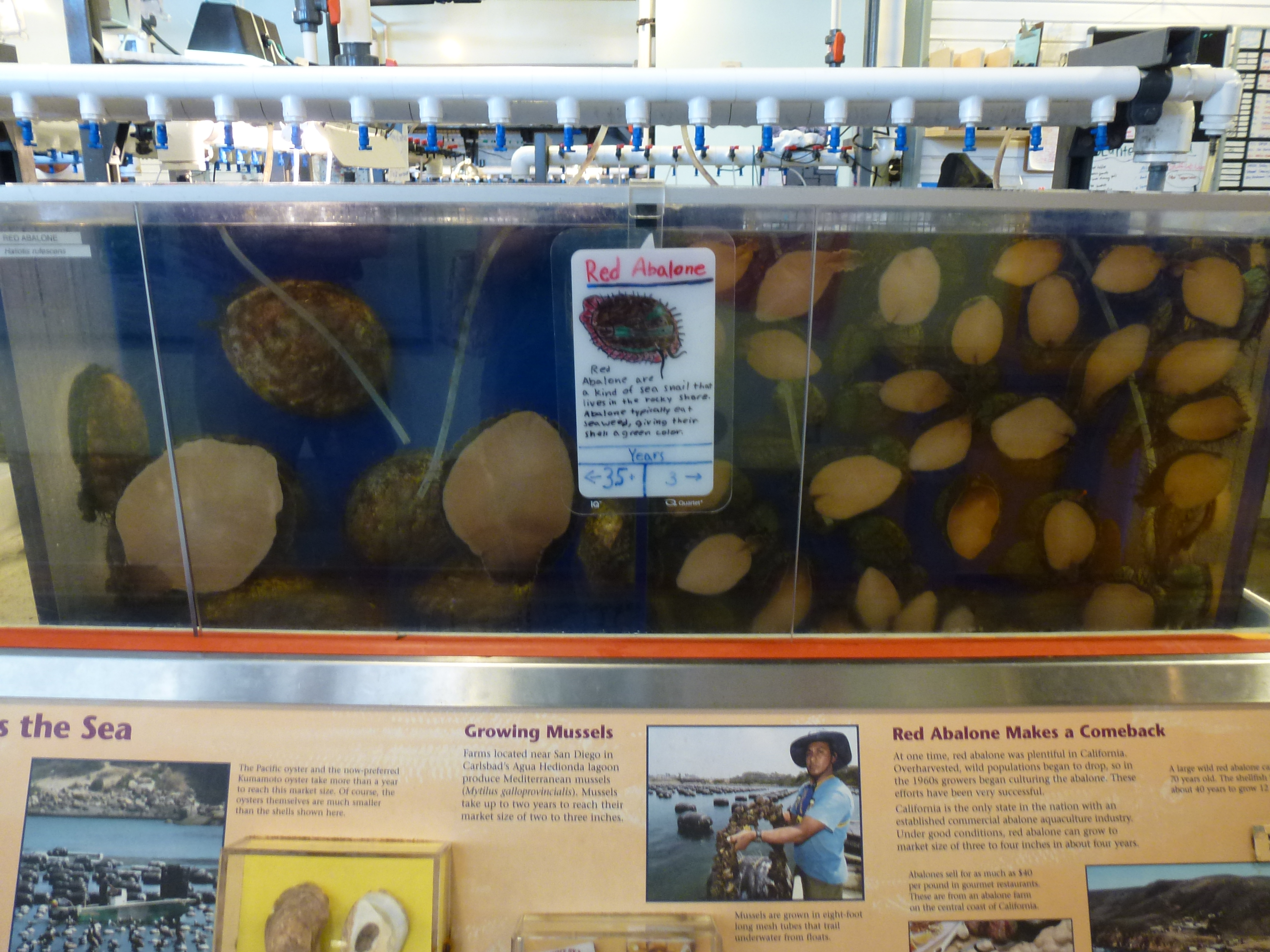
Red abalone aquaculture.

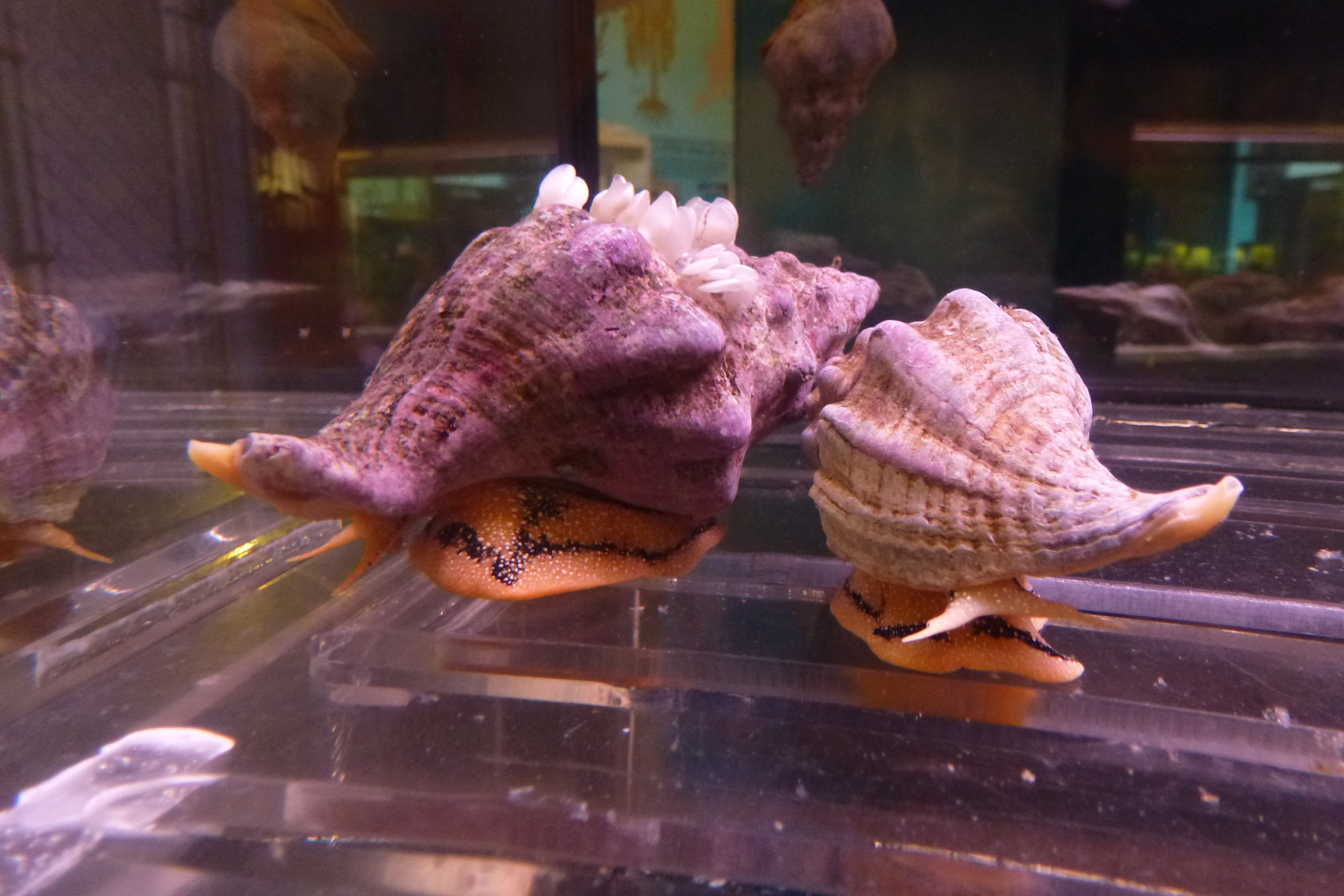
Kellet's whelk at the aquarium.

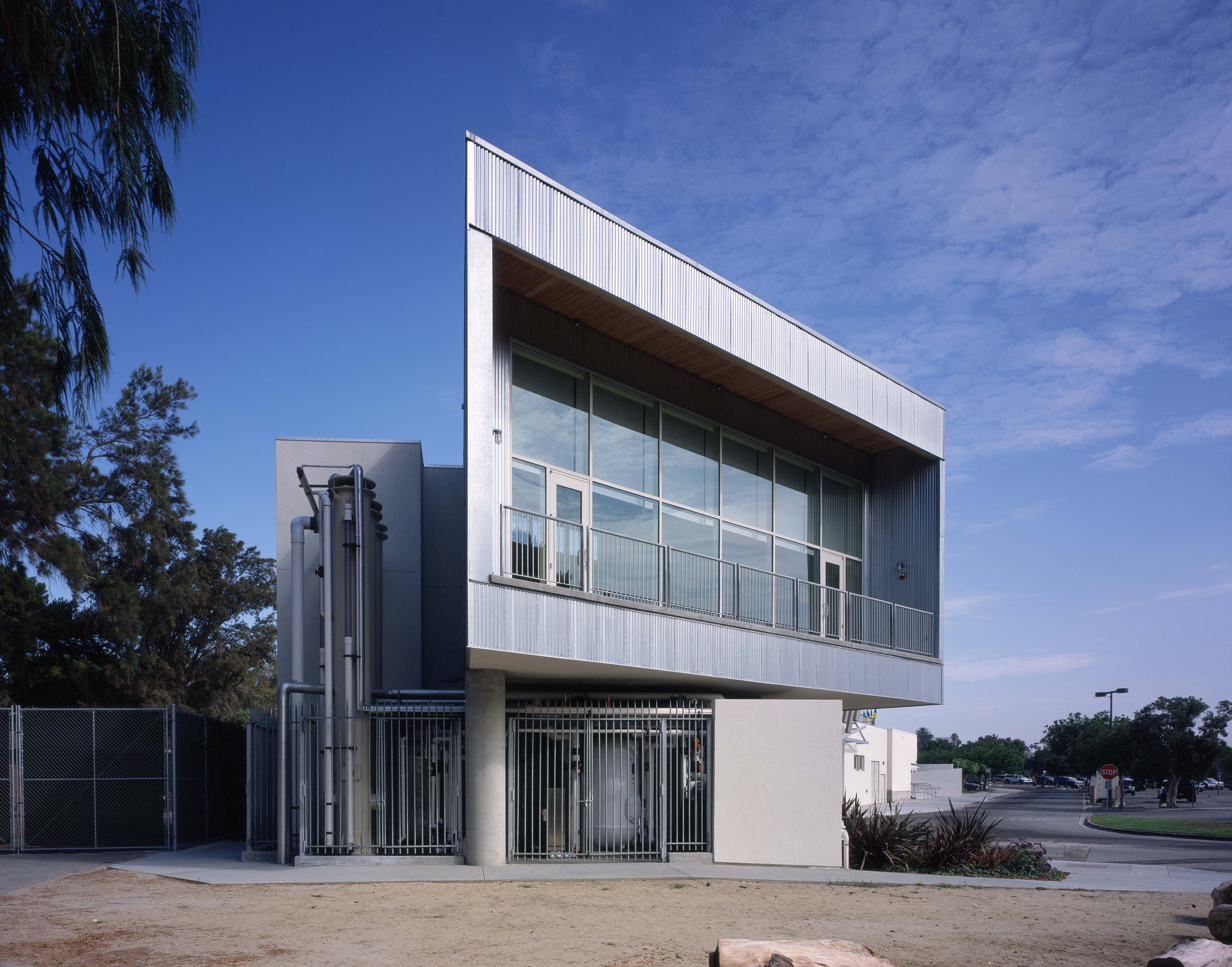
Virginia Reed Moore Research Library.

== See also ==
- List of works by Frank Gehry
