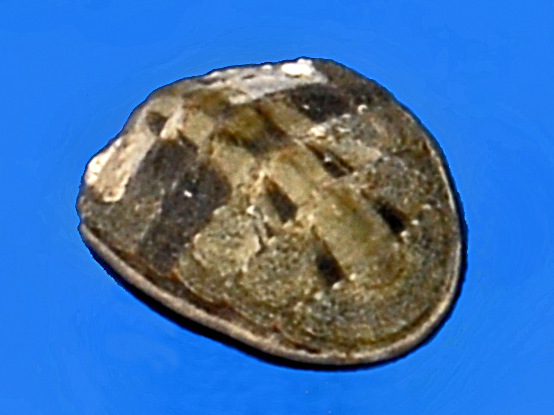
- Lepidochitonidae

Scientific classification
- Domain: Eukaryota
- Kingdom: Animalia
- Phylum: Mollusca
- Class: Polyplacophora
- Order: Chitonida
- Family: Lepidochitonidae

= Lepidochitonidae =

Family of molluscs

Lepidochitonidae is a family of chitons belonging to the order Chitonida.

Genera:

- Cyanoplax Pilsbry, 1892
- Juvenichiton Sirenko, 1975
- Lepidochitona Gray, 1821
- Micichiton Sirenko, 1975
- Nanichiton Sirenko, 1975
- Nuttallina Dall, 1871
- Particulazona Kaas, 1993
