= Pearlretta DuPuy =

American zither player and clubwoman (1871–1939)

Pearlretta Weller Severance DuPuy
- Born: Pearlretta Weller; June 27, 1871; Waterloo, Iowa, U.S.
- Died: April 27, 1939 (aged 67); San Pedro, Los Angeles, California, U.S.
- Resting place: Evergreen Cemetery, Los Angeles
- Occupation(s): Zither player, clubwoman, lecturer, parliamentarian
- Spouses: William Mulholland Severance (m. ?–1895, his death); * Robert Gay DuPuy (m. 1898–1939, her death)
- Parent(s): Zachariah H. Weller and Eliza Klingaman

Pearlretta Weller Severance DuPuy (June 27, 1871 – April 27, 1939) was a noted zither player, and later she became a member of the San Pedro Woman's Club, in addition to being a lecturer and parliamentarian.

== Early life ==
Pearlretta Weller was born on June 27, 1871, in Waterloo, Iowa, the daughter of Zachariah H. Weller and Eliza Klingaman, and moved to California in 1887.

== Music ==
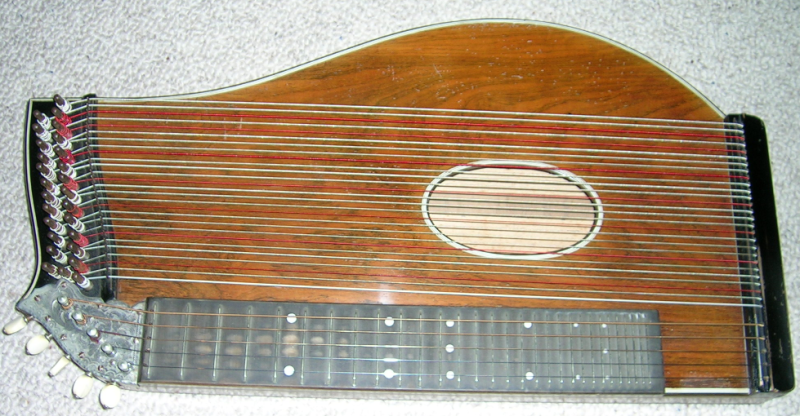
Zither

Pearl Weller Severance Dupuy was a noted zither player, usually performing with her sister, Daisy Weller.

On June 24, 1893, Professor M. S. Arevalo gave a successful concert at the YWCA Auditorium, Los Angeles; Arevalo was a well known musician of rare talent, and the concert was a triumph; the prelude of the concert was a march, arranged by Arevalo, given by the guitar club composed by the following artists: L. L. Taggart, Pearl W. Severance, Lizzie Thayer, Mabel McFarland, H. T. Longstreth, H. Brodrick, V. Wankowski, and M. Carrizosa. On November 23, 1897, she gave a zither concert at Blanchard-Fitzgerald Hall in Los Angeles, assisted by Maud Priest and Lillian Weller, guitars, Daisy Weller, zither, and M.S. Arevalo, guitar. She performed also outside California; on February 23, 1894, she played at the Baptist church in Phoenix, Arizona. According to the record, every seat available was filled and included the elite of the city. The concert was far above the average and she was highly praised for the performance. On February 3, 1906, she performed at the First Brethren Church in her native Waterloo, Iowa.

== Club leadership ==
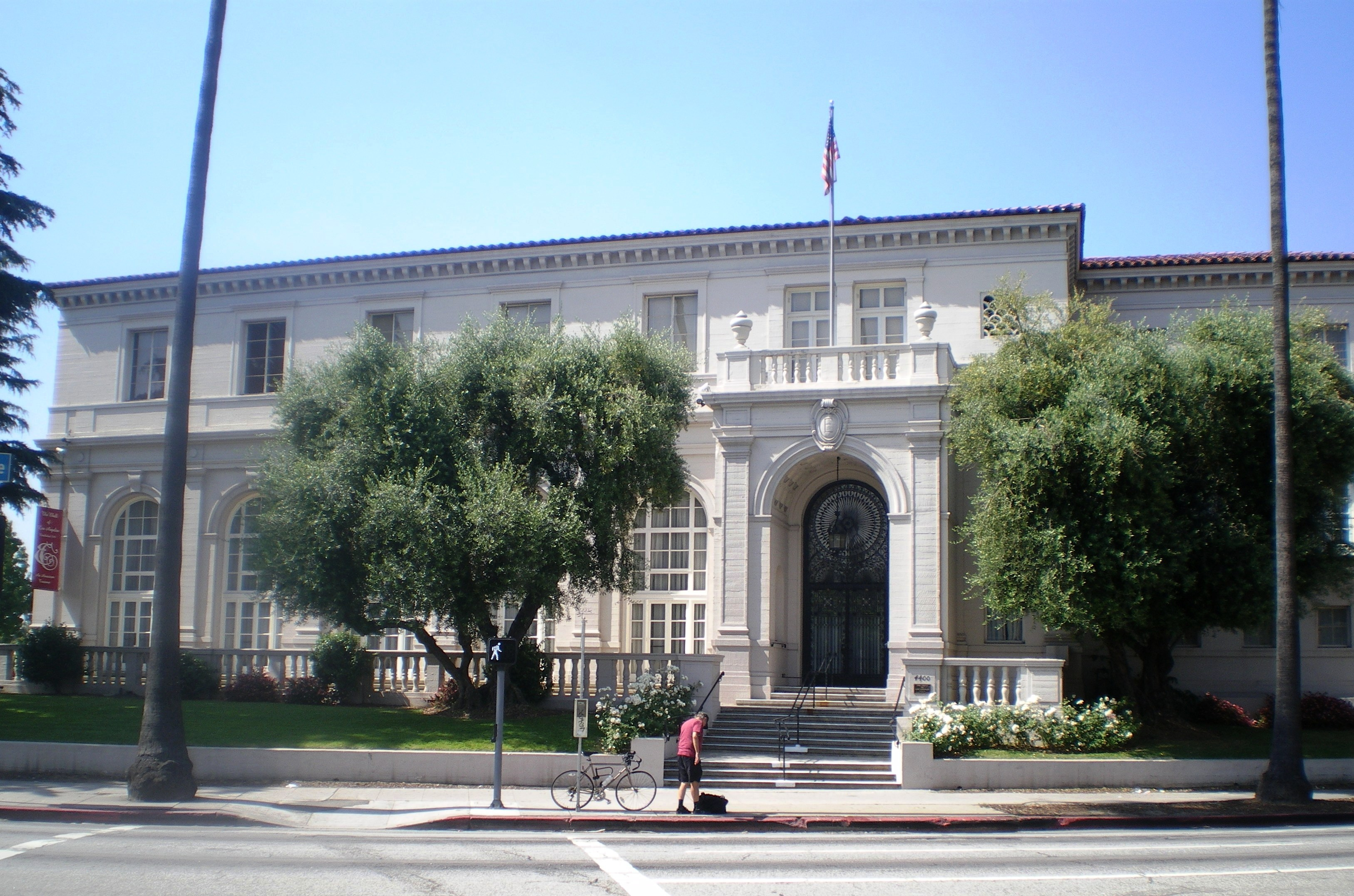
Ebell of Los Angeles

Pearlretta DuPuy was president of the San Pedro Woman's Club in 1908; she resigned from the position but in October 1916 she was named again president replacing Mrs. Richard C. Goodspeed, resigning on account of serious illness. The Woman's Club of San Pedro, Los Angeles District, was organized in January 1906 and federated in November 1907. The members met every first and third Tuesday first at Liberty Hall, 264 Fifth St. and then moved at the Masonic Hall, 525 1/2 Beacon St., San Pedro, California.

DuPuy was the first vice-president of the General Henry Martyn Robert Parliamentary Club of Los Angeles. During the meeting of the Robert Parliamentary Club, parliamentary questions were asked at members and Robert's Rules of Order was the reference manual. On November 27, 1920, she led a debate upon the subject "Shall Women Give up the Battle for Community Property Rights?"

She was active in civic and club affairs. She was a charter member of the Los Angeles Women's Athletic Club, Ebell of Los Angeles, the Republican Study Club, the San Pedro Golf and Country Club, the California Bridge Club, the Wednesday Afternoon Whist Club, the Dutch Club.

In 1908, DuPuy was on the organizing committee for the 8th Annual Meeting of the Los Angeles District of the California Federation of Women's Club to be held in Venice, California. On January 15, 1912, DuPuy was on the committee organizing the visit of leading members of Women's Clubs in Los Angeles.

In 1924, DuPuy was among the 150 Republican women of Los Angeles supporting the presidential campaign of Calvin Coolidge; in particular DuPuy was representing San Pedro.

== Personal life ==
Pear Weller firstly married William Mulholland Severance (1863–1895), in San Francisco, who died of typhoid fever. On December 3, 1898, she secondly married Robert Gay DuPuy (1867–1946), a music teacher and later an employee of the Harbor City Savings Bank.

Soon after her marriage to DuPuy, she lived at 1386 West 13th St., Los Angeles, and then at 4074 Bluff Place, San Pedro, California. She later moved to 657 6th Street, San Pedro.

She died on April 27, 1939, and is buried at Evergreen Cemetery, Los Angeles.
