= James H. Dodson Residence =

Coordinates: 33.732163°N 118.295909°W

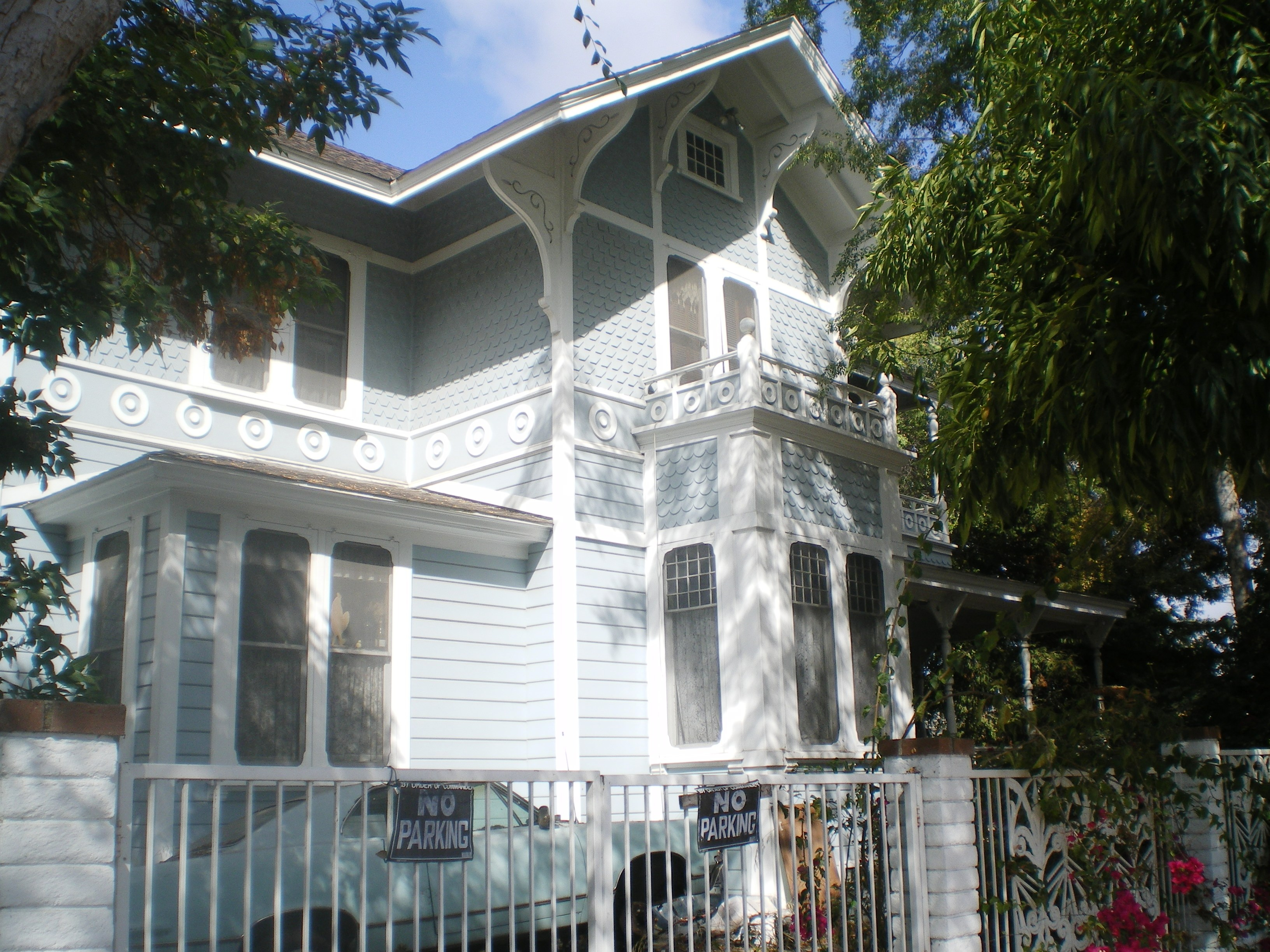
- Facade of James H. Dodson Residence

- Location within the Los Angeles metropolitan area
- Location: 859 W. 13th St., San Pedro, Los Angeles, California

History
- Built: 1881

Site notes
- Architectural style: Victorian Stick-Eastlake
- Governing body: private

Los Angeles Historic-Cultural Monument
- Designated: September 17, 1976
- Reference no.: 147

The James H. Dodson Residence is a Los Angeles Historic-Cultural Monument (HCM #147) located in the San Pedro community of Los Angeles, California, near the Port of Los Angeles.

== History ==
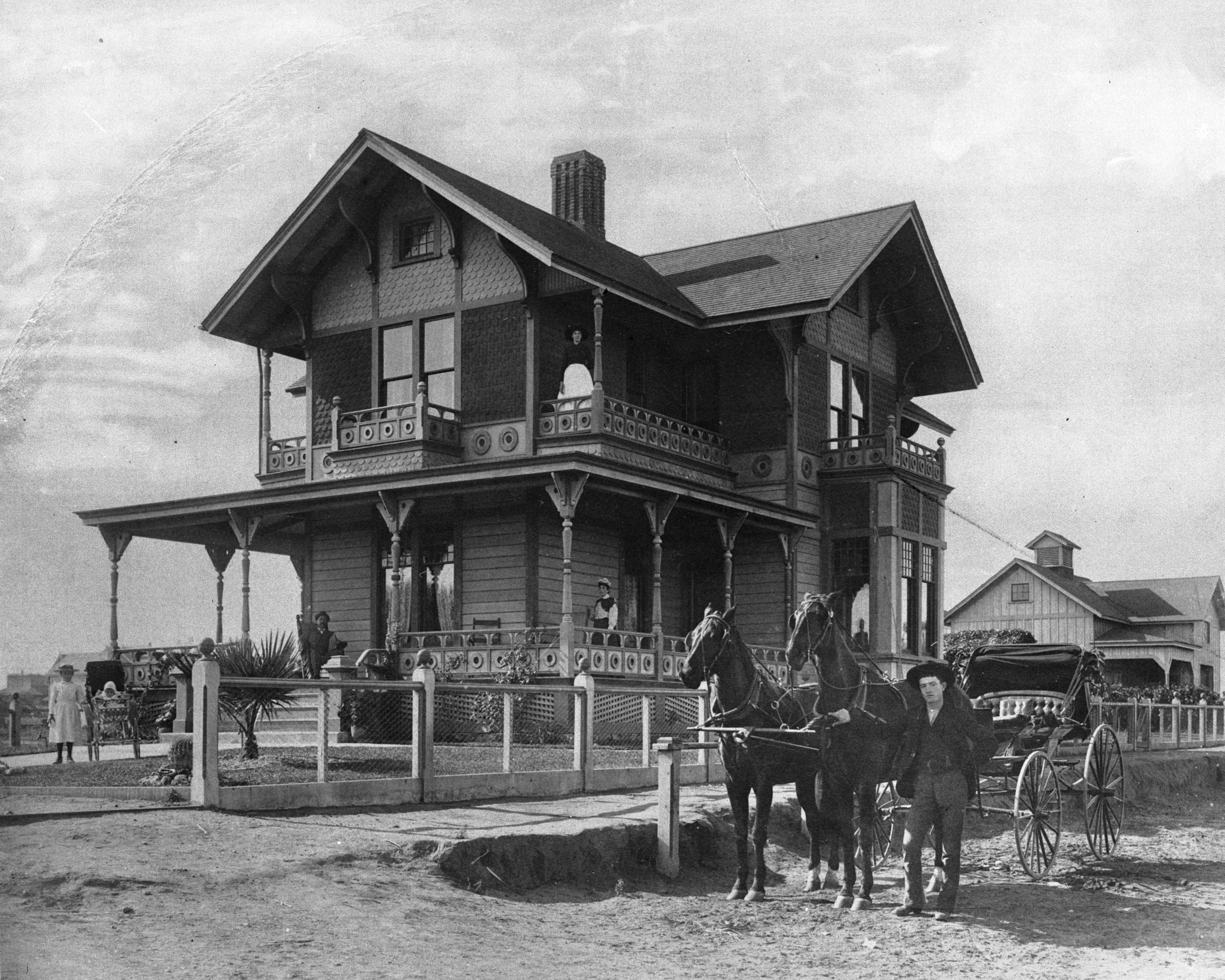
View of the J. H. Dodson Residence in San Pedro (ca.1895).

The Victorian Stick-Eastlake style wooden house was built in 1881 by the Francisco Xavier Sepúlveda family as a wedding present for their daughter Rudecinda and her husband, James H. Dodson, the son of Arthur McKenzie Dodson.

It was originally located at the corner of 7th and Beacon Streets in San Pedro. It is a private residence and is not open to the public.

== See also ==
- List of Los Angeles Historic-Cultural Monuments in the Harbor area
- San Pedro, Los Angeles topics
