= Rudecinda Sepúlveda Dodson =

American clubwoman (1858–1930)

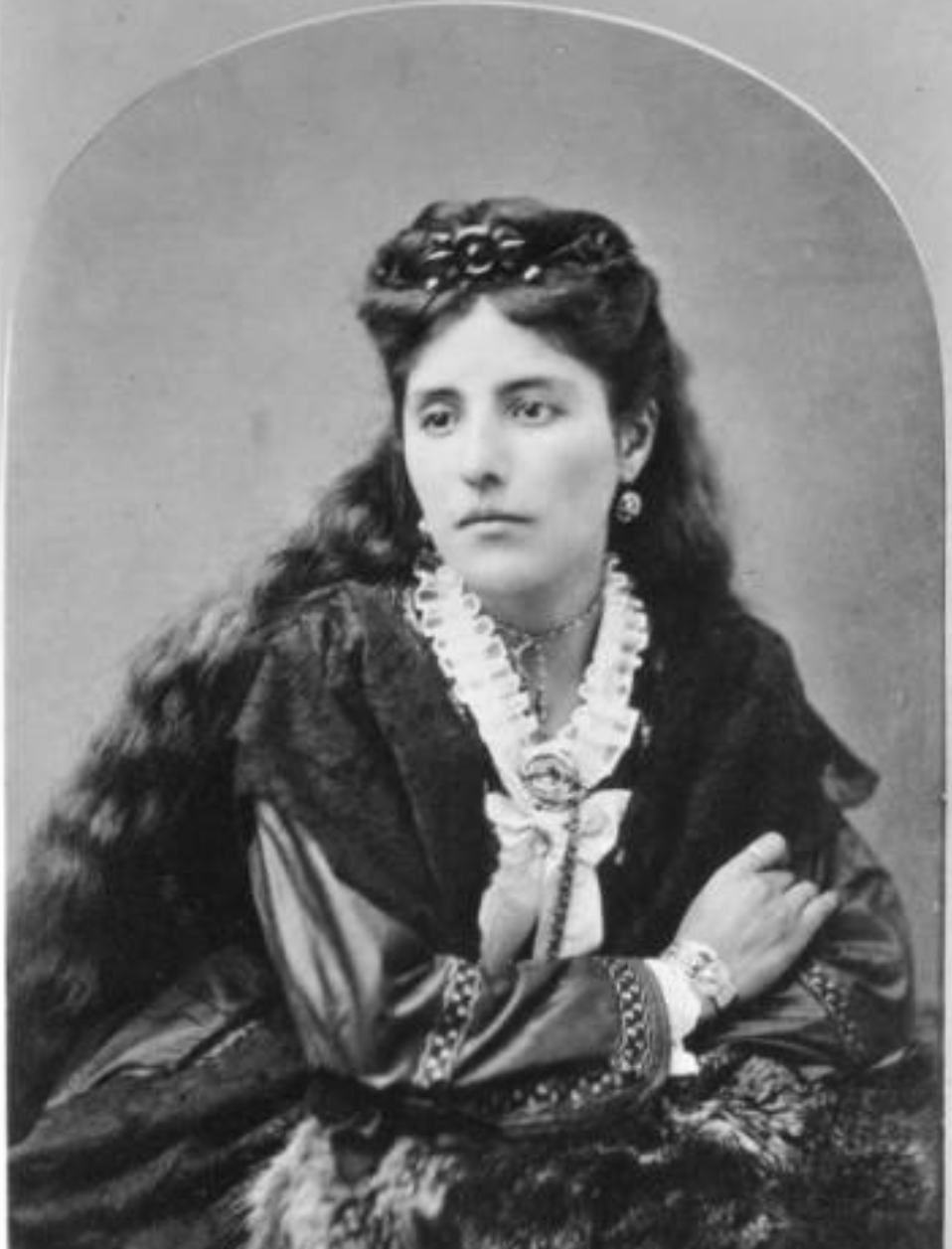
- Born: María Rudecinda Florencía Sepúlveda; October 27, 1858; Palos Verdes Peninsula, California, U.S.
- Died: September 11, 1930 (aged 71); Los Angeles, California, U.S.
- Occupations: Clubwoman, landowner, philanthropist, political hostess
- Spouse: James H. Dodson
- Relatives: Arthur McKenzie Dodson (father-in-law)

María Rudecinda Florencía Sepúlveda de Dodson (October 27, 1858 – September 11, 1930) was an American landowner, clubwoman, and political hostess based in San Pedro, California. She was a member of the Sepúlveda family of California, and "a dominant figure in the social and club affairs of Southern California." She was sometimes known as "the fairy godmother of San Pedro."

== Early life and education ==
Sepúlveda was born in Palos Verdes, California, the daughter of José Diego Sepúlveda and Maria Francisca Elisalde de Sepúlveda.

== Career ==
Dodson founded the San Pedro Woman's Club in 1905 and was active in the causes of suffrage and temperance. She donated land for a church, a fire station, a theater, a park, and other community purposes. She was a chapter president of the Native Daughters of the Golden West, and a benefactor of the American Red Cross.

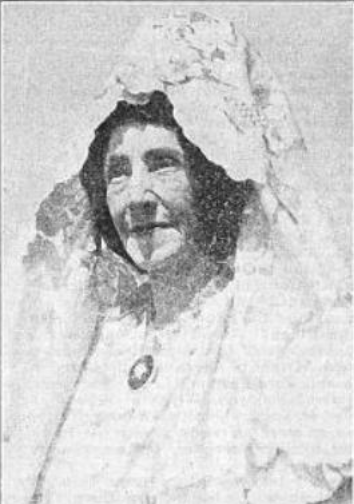
Dodson in antique lace headpiece and dress, from a 1930 obituary

== Personal life and legacy ==
Rudecinda Chapel, her final resting place at Harbor View Cemetary, San Pedro, California

In 1881, Sepúlveda married James H. Dodson, mayor of San Pedro. They had three children: James H. Jr., Carlos (Carl) and Florencia (Florence). She died after a stroke in 1930, at the age of 71. Rudecinda Sepulveda Dodson Middle School in Rancho Palos Verdes is named in her memory.
