= Port of Los Angeles High School =

Location
- 250 West 5th Street; San Pedro, California 90731; United States; 33.74041°N 118.28265°W

Information
- Type: Charter school
- Motto: International Business and Maritime Studies
- Established: 2005
- School district: Port of Los Angeles School District
- Dean: Arturo Escandon
- Principal: Tim Dikdan (Interim)
- Faculty: 53.25 (FTE)
- Enrollment: 928 (2022-2023)
- Student to teacher ratio: 17.43
- Classes offered: General, Honors, AP®, College Courses, and Egyptian MMA Training, CTE Certification Programs
- Colors: Forest green and black
- Athletics: Yes
- Mascot: Polar Bear
- Accreditations: California State Gold Ribbon School - California State Distinguished School
- Newspaper: Bear Tracks
- Website: www.polahs.net

Port of Los Angeles High School (POLAHS) is a public charter tuition-free high school in San Pedro, California, United States. It was established in 2005, and fuses a college preparatory program with elective coursework in International Business and Maritime Studies. Such studies reinforce the significant impact of California's ports on the global economy and international trade. Although under the umbrella of the Los Angeles Unified School District, the charter school is run by its own independent school district, Port of Los Angeles High School District. The sports programs at POLAHS compete under the CIF Los Angeles City Section and have captured nine overall sports championships, the last one being the 2022 Boys' Basketball team winning the Division 4 championship.

== Board of trustees ==
The Board of Trustees is responsible for establishing and overseeing the mission of Port of Los Angeles High School. It has the ultimate authority over and responsibility for all fiscal and operational policies within the limitations and guidelines of the California State Charter School Education Code, the California Non-Profit Public Benefit Law and the POLAHS Charter and Board of Trustees Bylaws.

The Board may delegate the management of the corporation's activities to any person(s), management company, contracted business entity, or committees, however composed, provided that the activities and affairs of the corporation shall be managed and all corporate powers shall be exercised under the ultimate direction of the Board.
