= San Pedro Woman's Club =

California civic organization, established 1905

The San Pedro Woman's Club (SPWC) was a civic organization created in 1905 in San Pedro, California. The organization consisted mainly of the wives of prominent members of the community and was concerned with the improvement of the city. SPWC was affiliated with the California Federation of Woman's Clubs (CFWC).

== About ==
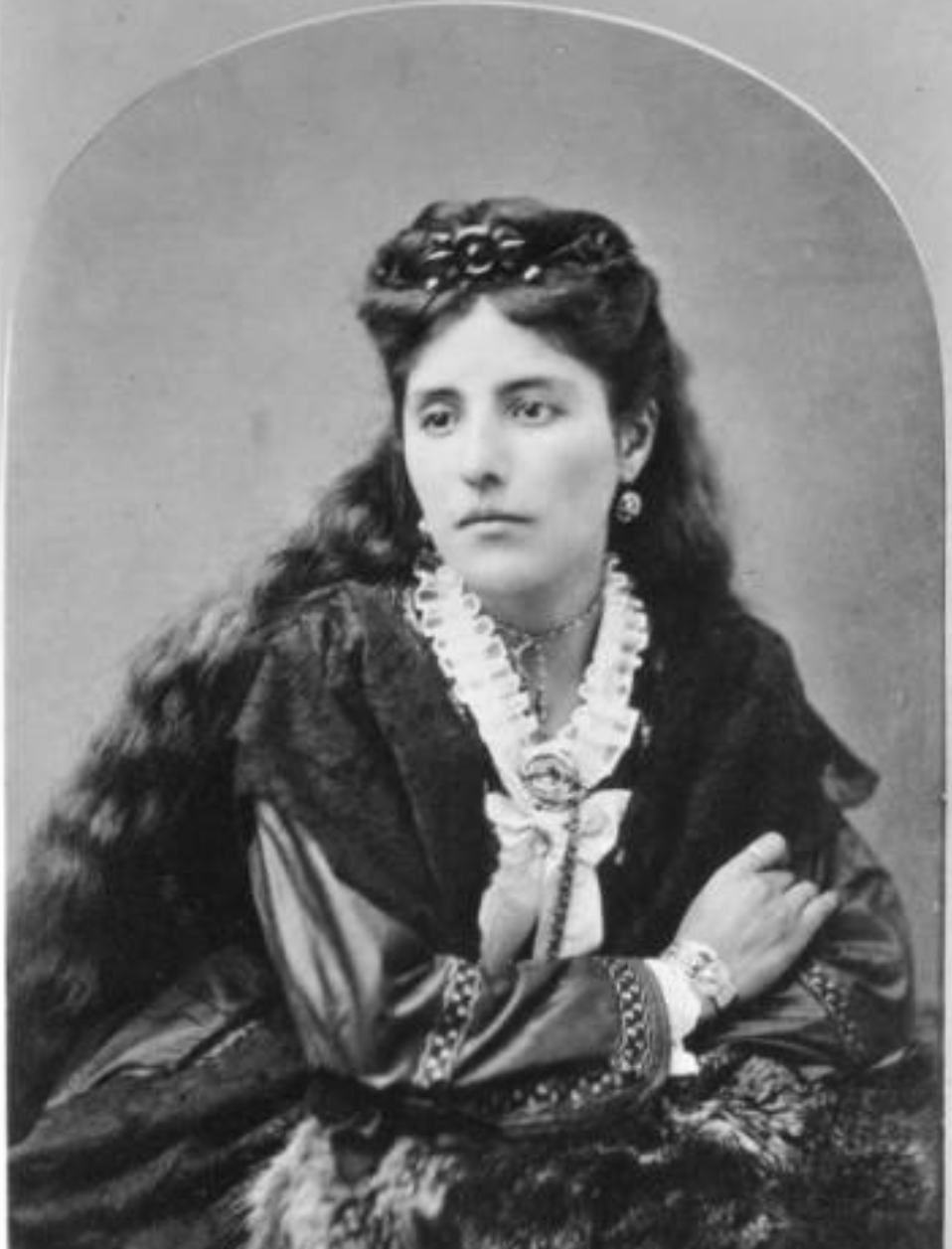
Rudecinda Sepúlveda de Dodson, a Californio heiress and one of the club's founders, donated the land to build the first clubhouse.

The club was founded as a literary association in 1905, but re-organized in 1906 under the leadership of Fanny Hogaboom to respond to moves by the city of Los Angeles to annex San Pedro. It quickly became involved in serious municipal improvements to San Pedro. It became federated in November 1907. The club, partnering with the local chapter of the Women's Christian Temperance Union (WCTU) started their reforms by working to eliminate saloons. SPWC installed drinking fountains in the city as an alternative to needing to purchase drinks in a saloon. SPWC also persuaded the city council to shut down saloons for one day a week. They planted trees throughout the city on Arbor Day in 1909.

In addition to civic improvements, the club also held lectures. Some of the lectures were practical in nature, such as preparing women to vote. The club was also involved in charity work. When the United States Coast Guard ship, USRC McCulloch, had a shipwreck, the crew of the ship were housed at the San Pedro woman's clubhouse.
