= San Pedro, Los Angeles =

Neighborhood in California, United States

San Pedro
- Neighborhood of Los Angeles
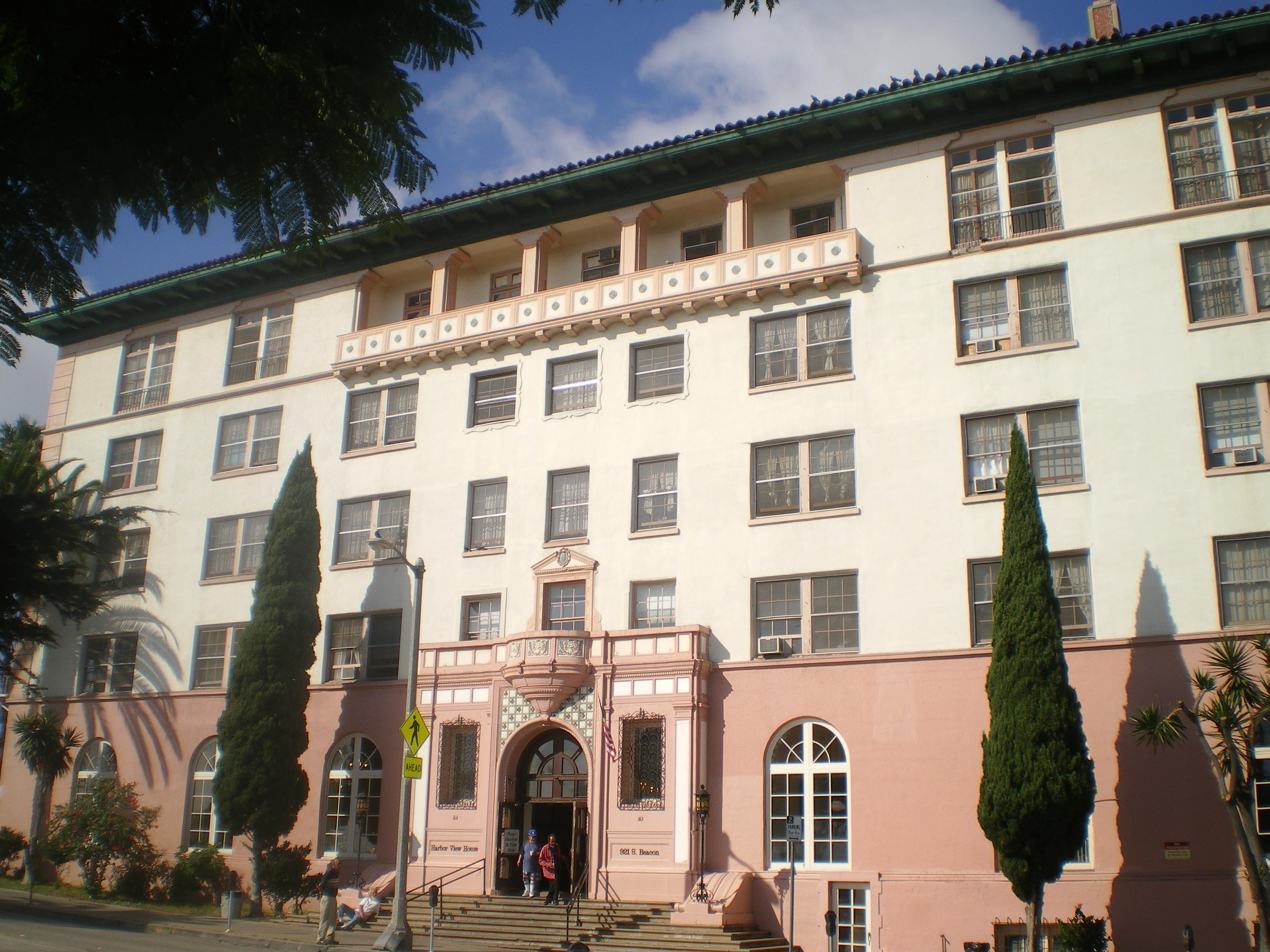
- The historic Harbor View House

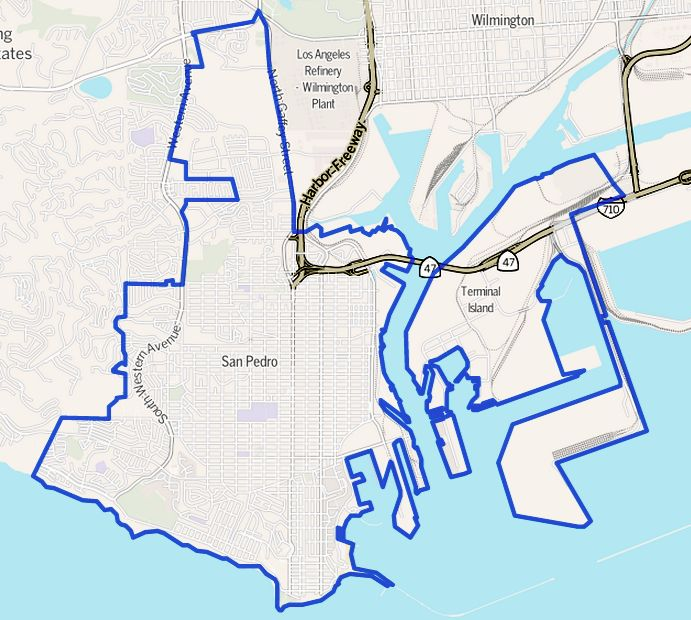
- Boundaries of San Pedro as drawn by the Los Angeles Times

- Location within Southern Los Angeles
- Coordinates: 33.74°N 118.29°W
- Country: United States
- State: California
- County: Los Angeles
- City: Los Angeles
- Named for: Pope Peter I of Alexandria
- Elevation: 112 ft (34 m)

Population (2022)
  - Total: 83,556
- Time zone: UTC−8 (PST)
  - Summer (DST): UTC−7 (PDT)
- ZIP Codes: 90731–90734
- Area codes: 310/424
- GNIS feature ID: 1661392

San Pedro (/sæn ˈpiːdroʊ/ san PEE-droh; Spanish for 'Saint Peter') is a neighborhood located within the South Bay and Harbor region of the city of Los Angeles, California, United States. Formerly a separate city, it consolidated with Los Angeles in 1909. The Port of Los Angeles, a major international seaport, is partially located within San Pedro. The district has grown from being dominated by the fishing industry, to a working-class community within the city of Los Angeles, to an increasingly dense and diverse community.

== History ==
=== Indigenous ===
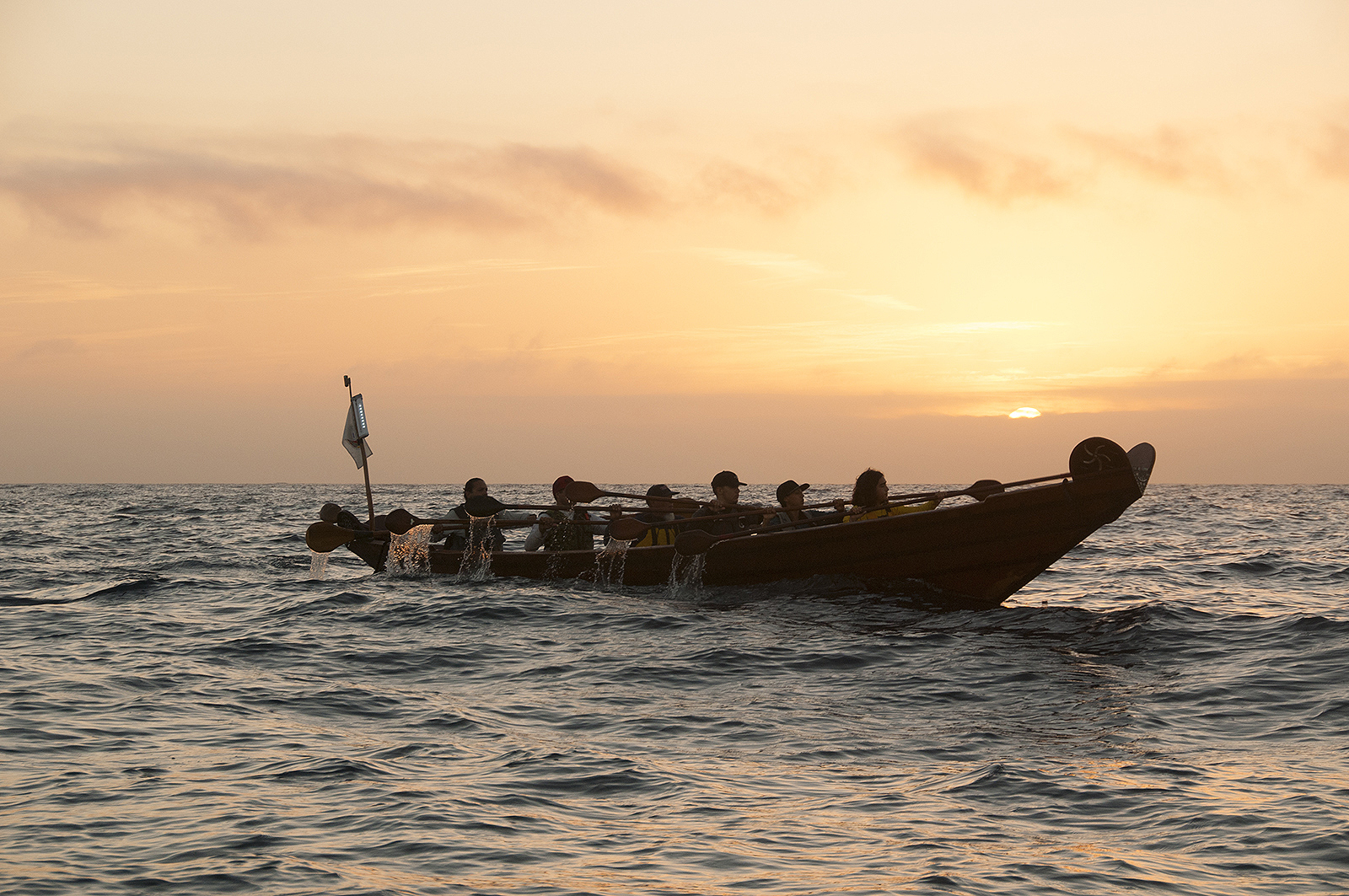
The Tongva used te'aats to navigate the coastline.

Archeological sites in the Los Angeles Basin date back about 10,000 years old. The peninsula, including all of San Pedro, was the homeland of the Tongva people and home to the villages of Chowigna and nearby Suangna. The Tongva used seafaring plank canoes or te'aats, found all throughout the coastline, to travel to and from the Channel Islands and along the coastline. The boats are still constructed by the Tongva today and retain a cultural significance.

First contact with Europeans occurred in 1542 with Juan Rodríguez Cabrillo, the Spanish explorer who noted the extensive presence of the plank boats of the neighboring Chumash.

=== Origin of name ===
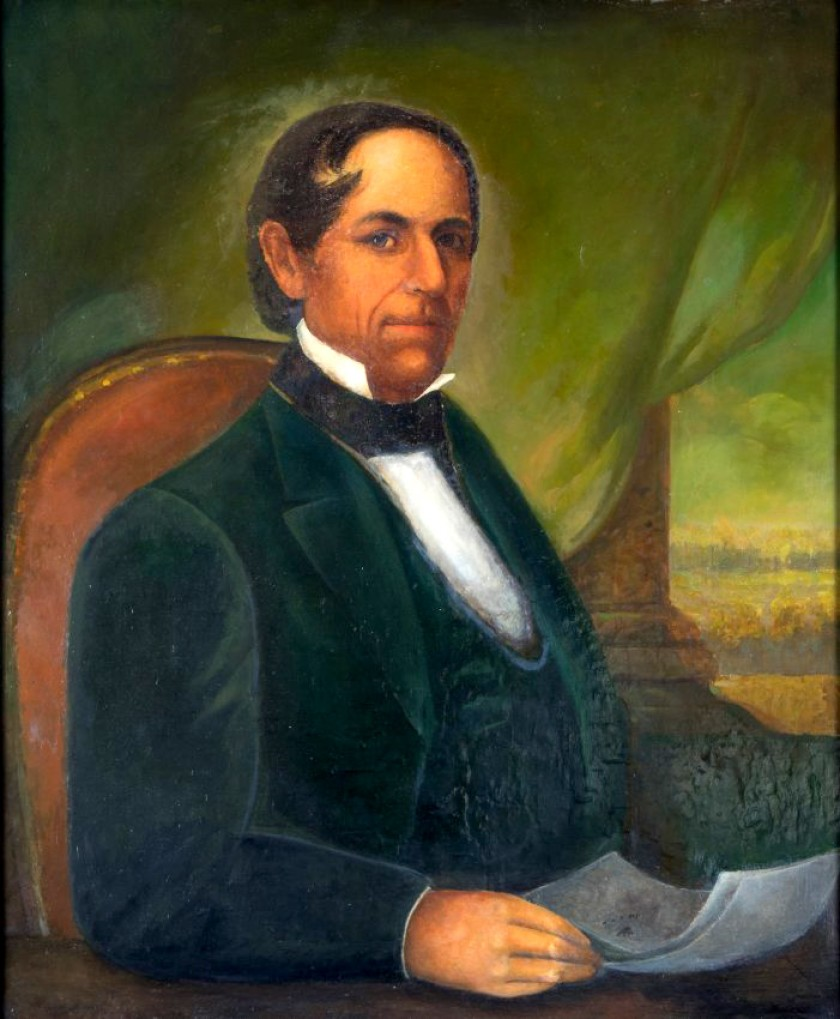
Don Manuel Domínguez, a Californio politician, signer of the California Constitution and owner of Rancho San Pedro helped found the settlement at San Pedro, then a small fishing village.

San Pedro was named for St. Peter of Alexandria, as his feast day is November 24 on the ecclesiastical calendar of Spain, the day on which Juan Rodríguez Cabrillo first encountered the San Pedro Bay in 1542. Santa Catalina Island, named after Catherine of Alexandria, was claimed for the Spanish Empire the next day, on her feast day, November 25. In 1602–1603, Sebastián Vizcaíno (1548–1624) officially surveyed and mapped the California coastline, including San Pedro Bay, for New Spain. The anglicized pronunciation is "san-PEE-dro".

=== Settlement ===
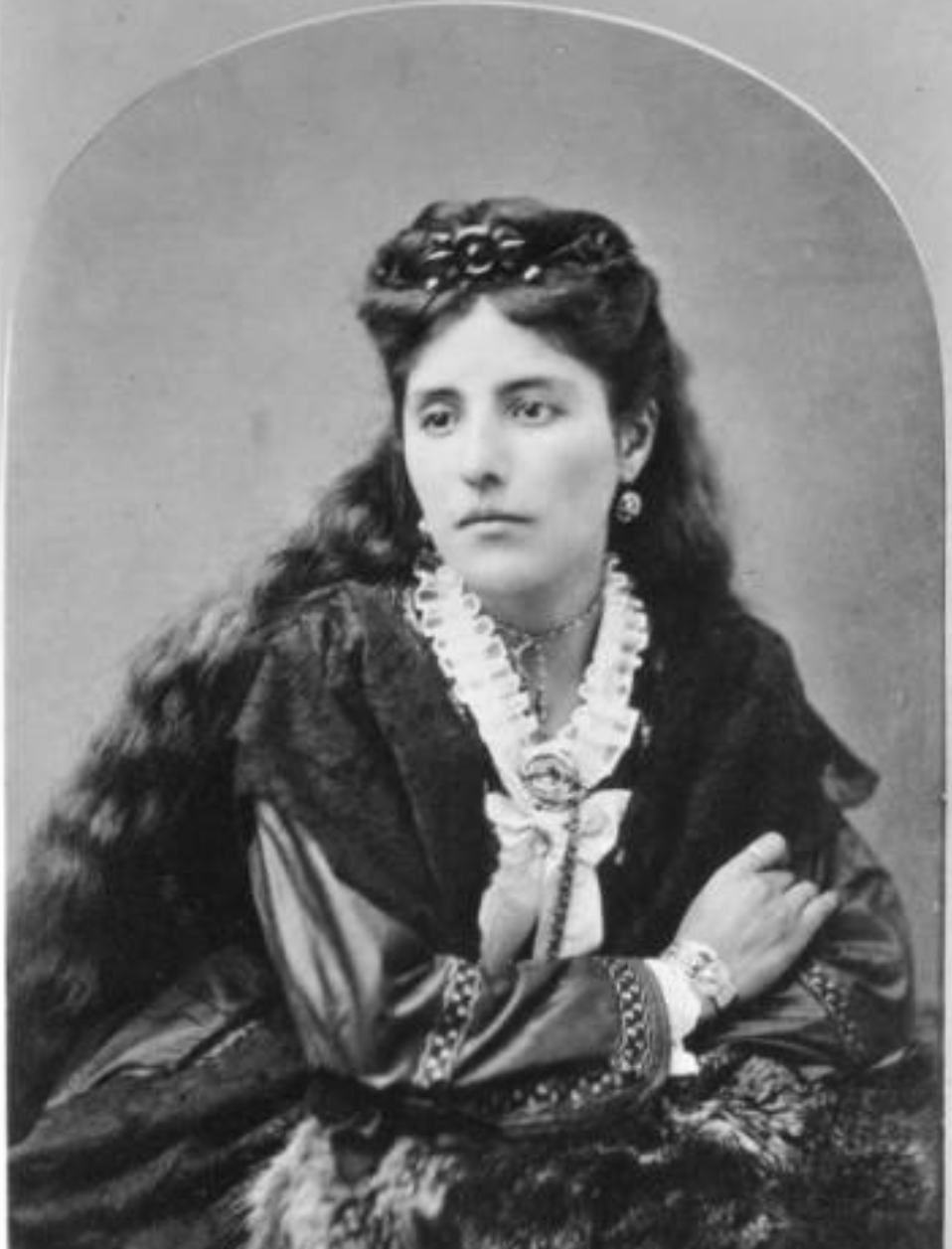
Rudecinda Sepúlveda de Dodson, pioneer of San Pedro and a founder of the San Pedro Woman's Club

European settlement began in 1769 as part of an effort to populate California, although trade restrictions encouraged more smuggling than regular business. In 1784, the Spanish Crown deeded Rancho San Pedro, a tract of over 75,000 acres (300 km^{2}), to retired soldier Juan José Domínguez, who helped explore California with the Portolá expedition in 1769–1770. Rancho San Pedro was the first land grant in the Alta California portion of the province of Las Californias in New Spain.

When New Spain won its independence from the Spanish Empire and Alta California became part of Mexico, the trade restrictions were lifted, and the town flourished.

Under United States control after 1848, when the United States defeated Mexico in the Mexican–American War, the harbor was greatly improved and expanded under the guidance of Phineas Banning and John Gately Downey, the seventh governor of California after the Free Harbor Fight. In 1868 Banning created the Los Angeles & San Pedro Railroad, Southern California's first railroad and used it to transport goods from San Pedro Bay to Los Angeles, which soon became a major city in Southern California.

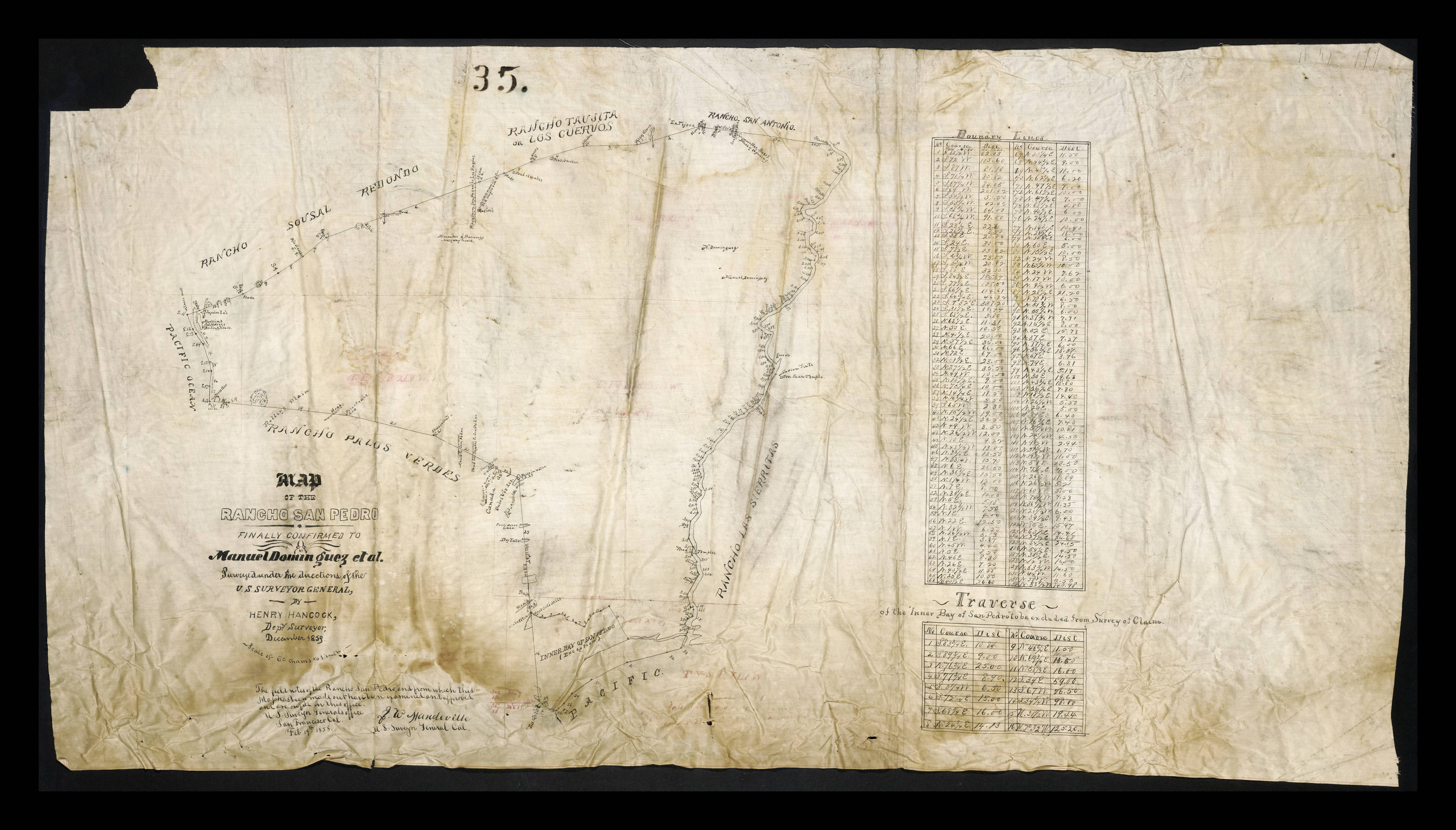
1859 survey map of Rancho San Pedro

Township

San Pedro was a township in the 1860 census. The township consisted of the present-day South Bay communities, Compton and western Long Beach. Census records report a population of 359 in 1860. The township was renamed Wilmington Township for 1870.

City

In 1906, the city of Los Angeles annexed the Harbor Gateway, a long, narrow strip of land connecting the city to the northern border of Wilmington, and in 1909, the larger city consolidated with Wilmington and with San Pedro.

In 1929, the city experienced the Sunken City Disaster, where an earthquake caused multiple homes to slide off a cliff into the sea.

=== United States Navy Battle Fleet home port 1919–1940 ===
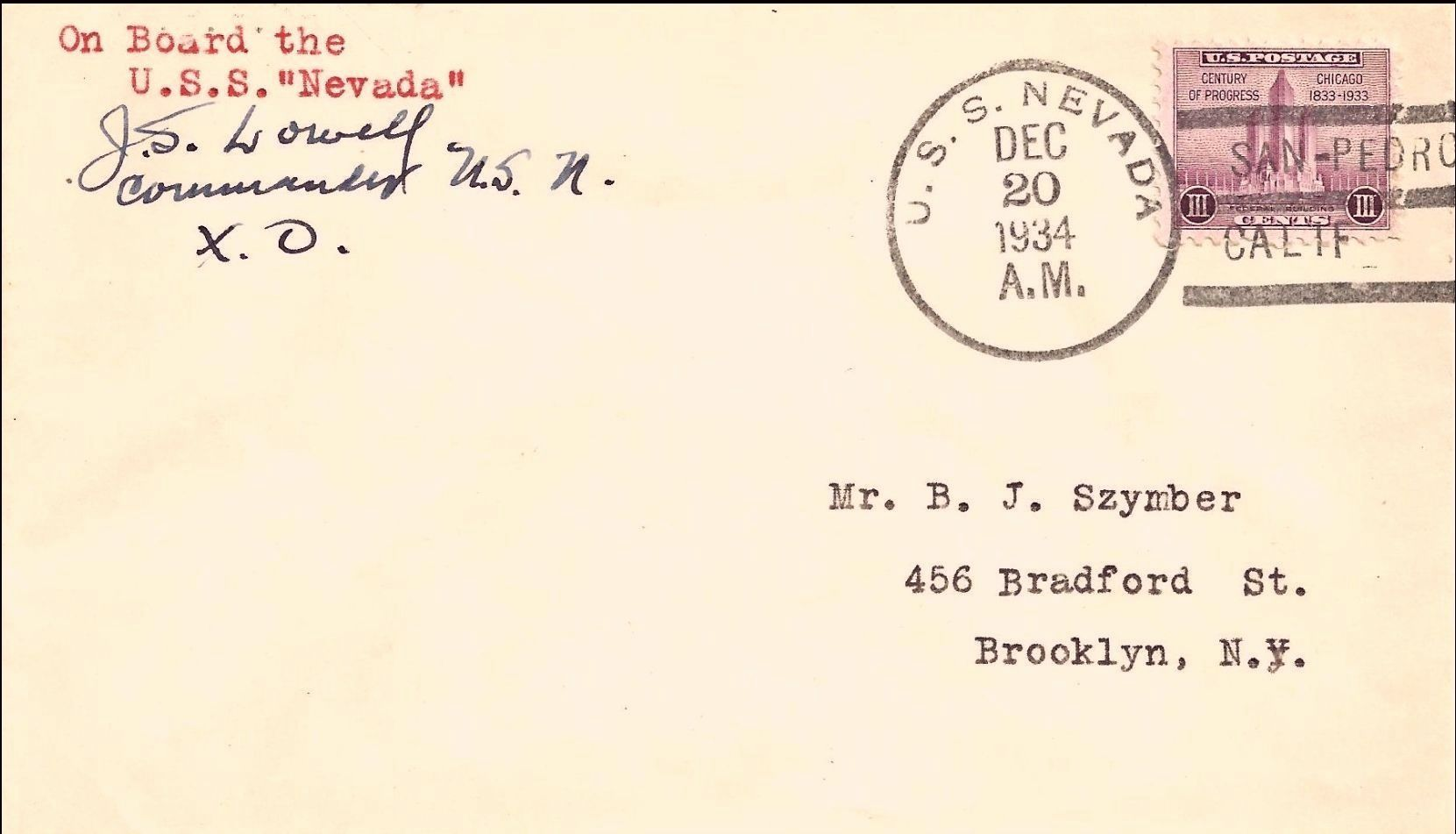
USS Nevada, port of call at San Pedro, 1934

In 1888, the War Department took control of a tract of land next to the bay and added to it in 1897 and 1910. This became Fort MacArthur in 1914 and was a coastal defense site for many years. Woodrow Wilson transferred 200 United States Navy ships from the Atlantic to the Pacific in 1919 when tension arose between the United States and Japan over the fate of China. San Diego Bay was considered too shallow for the largest ships, so the battleships anchored in San Pedro Bay on August 9, 1919. Local availability of fuel oil minimized transportation costs, and consistently good weather allowed frequent gunnery exercises off the nearby Channel Islands of California. The heavy cruisers of the Scouting Force were transferred from the Atlantic to San Pedro in response to the 1931 Japanese invasion of Manchuria. By 1934, 14 battleships, two aircraft carriers, 14 cruisers, and 16 support ships were based at San Pedro. On April 1, 1940, the Pacific Fleet battleships sailed to Hawaii for annual fleet exercises. The battleships remained in the Hawaiian Islands to deter Japanese aggression until the attack on Pearl Harbor. The fleet post office, supply depot, fuel depot, degaussing range, ECM repair facility, and naval training schools for small craft, fire fighters, merchant ship communications, and anti-submarine attack remained at San Pedro through World War II; but the battle fleet never returned.

San Pedro was selected as the final home port of the battleship USS Iowa (BB-61). The Iowa now serves as a museum ship and memorial recognizing "the positive contributions of this battleship and its crew at critical moments in American history".

Additionally, the United States Maritime Commission commissioned private San Pedro and Long Beach shipbuilders such as the Calship to build attack transports, Liberty ships, and Victory ships during World War II under the Emergency Shipbuilding Program, including the SS Lane Victory, now a designated a U.S. National Historic Landmark museum ship in San Pedro.

== Geography and climate ==
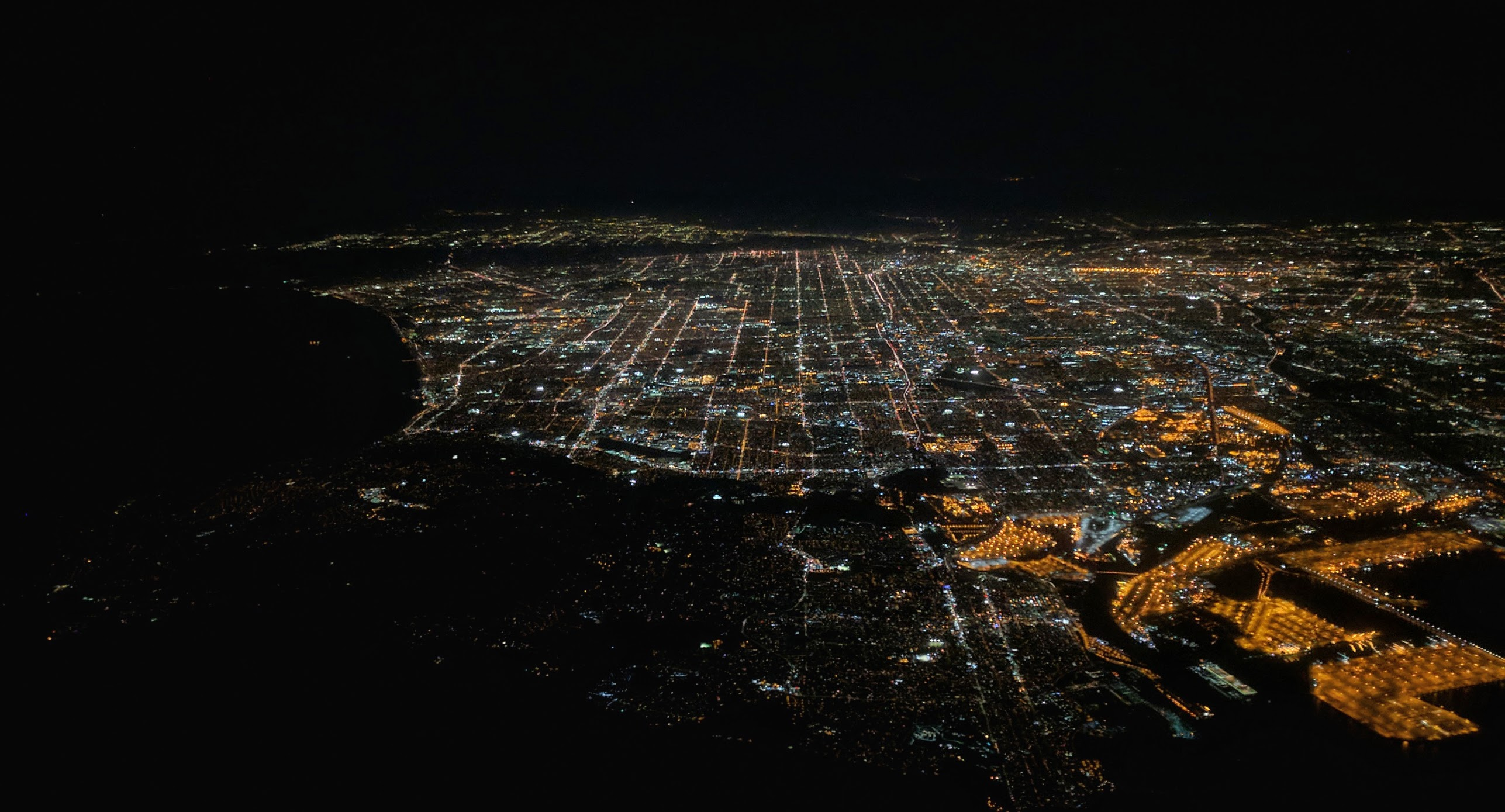
In this nighttime aerial photograph of Los Angeles, San Pedro is in the center and right foreground, including part of the brightly lit Terminal Island. The dark peninsula to the left of San Pedro is Palos Verdes.

The neighborhood is bordered to the north by the fellow Los Angeles City neighborhood of Harbor City and the city of Torrance, to the east by the Los Angeles City neighborhood of Wilmington and the city of Long Beach, to the south by the Pacific Ocean, and to the west by Rancho Palos Verdes and the city of Lomita.

Climate data for San Pedro, Los Angeles
Month	Jan	Feb	Mar	Apr	May	Jun	Jul	Aug	Sep	Oct	Nov	Dec	Year
Mean daily maximum °F (°C)	67 (19)	68 (20)	68 (20)	71 (22)	73 (23)	76 (24)	81 (27)	82 (28)	80 (27)	77 (25)	72 (22)	67 (19)	73 (23)
Mean daily minimum °F (°C)	46 (8)	48 (9)	50 (10)	52 (11)	56 (13)	59 (15)	62 (17)	63 (17)	62 (17)	57 (14)	50 (10)	46 (8)	54 (12)
Average precipitation inches (mm)	3.31 (84)	3.12 (79)	2.69 (68)	0.70 (18)	0.27 (6.9)	0.08 (2.0)	0.03 (0.76)	0.13 (3.3)	0.25 (6.4)	0.43 (11)	1.17 (30)	1.85 (47)	14.02 (356)

== Locations of interest ==
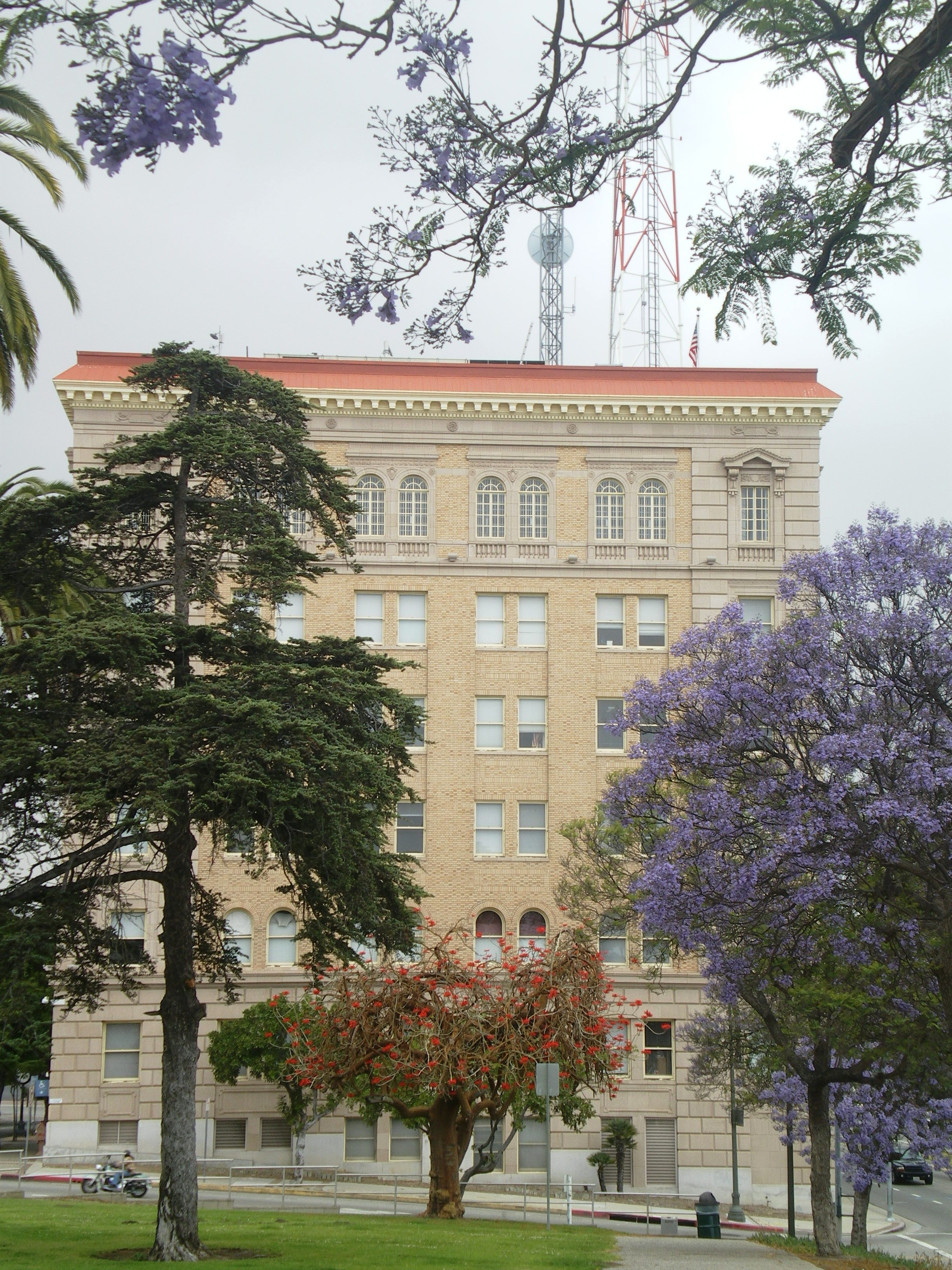
San Pedro Municipal Building, Beaux-Arts structure completed in 1928

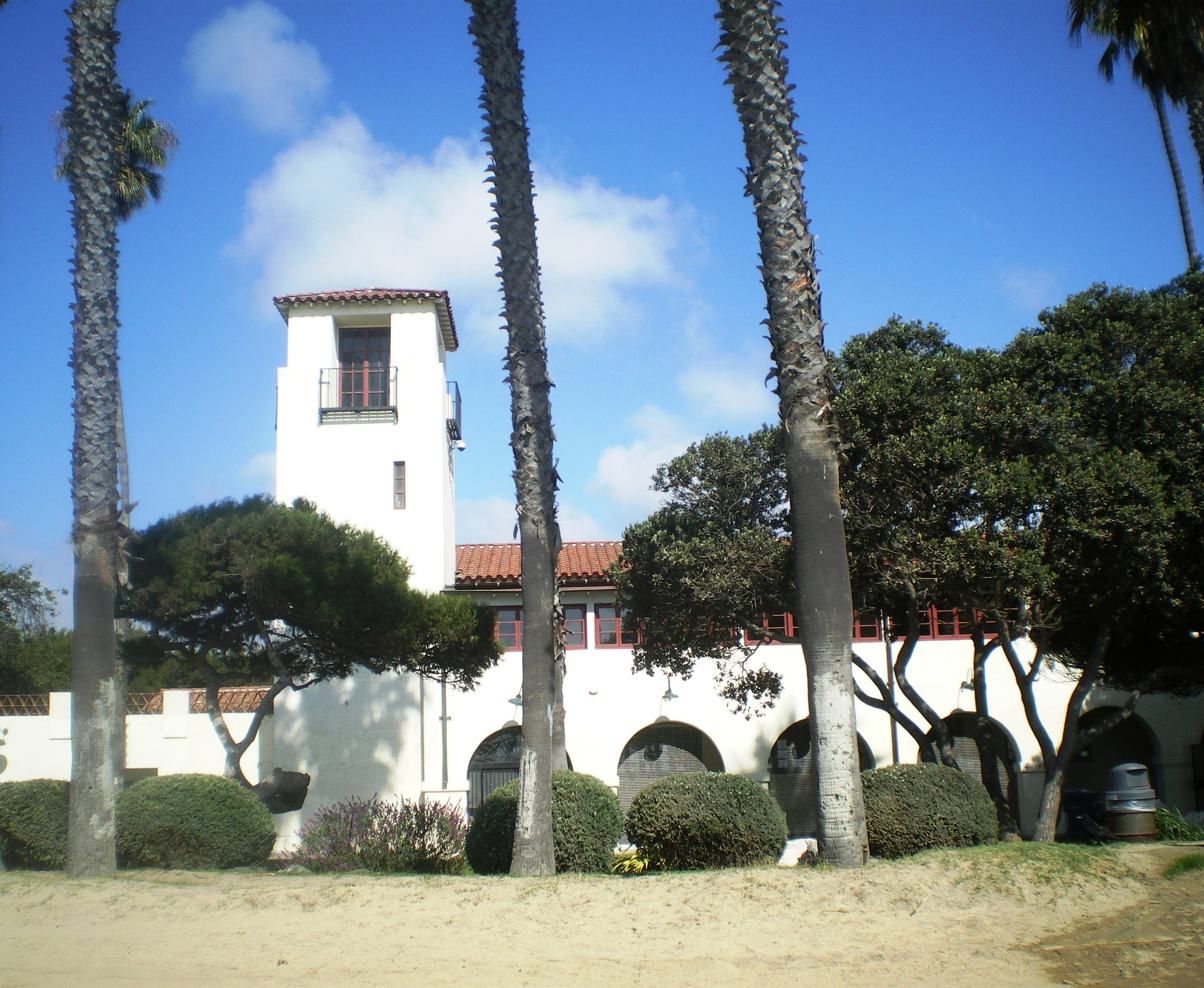
Cabrillo Beach Bathhouse.

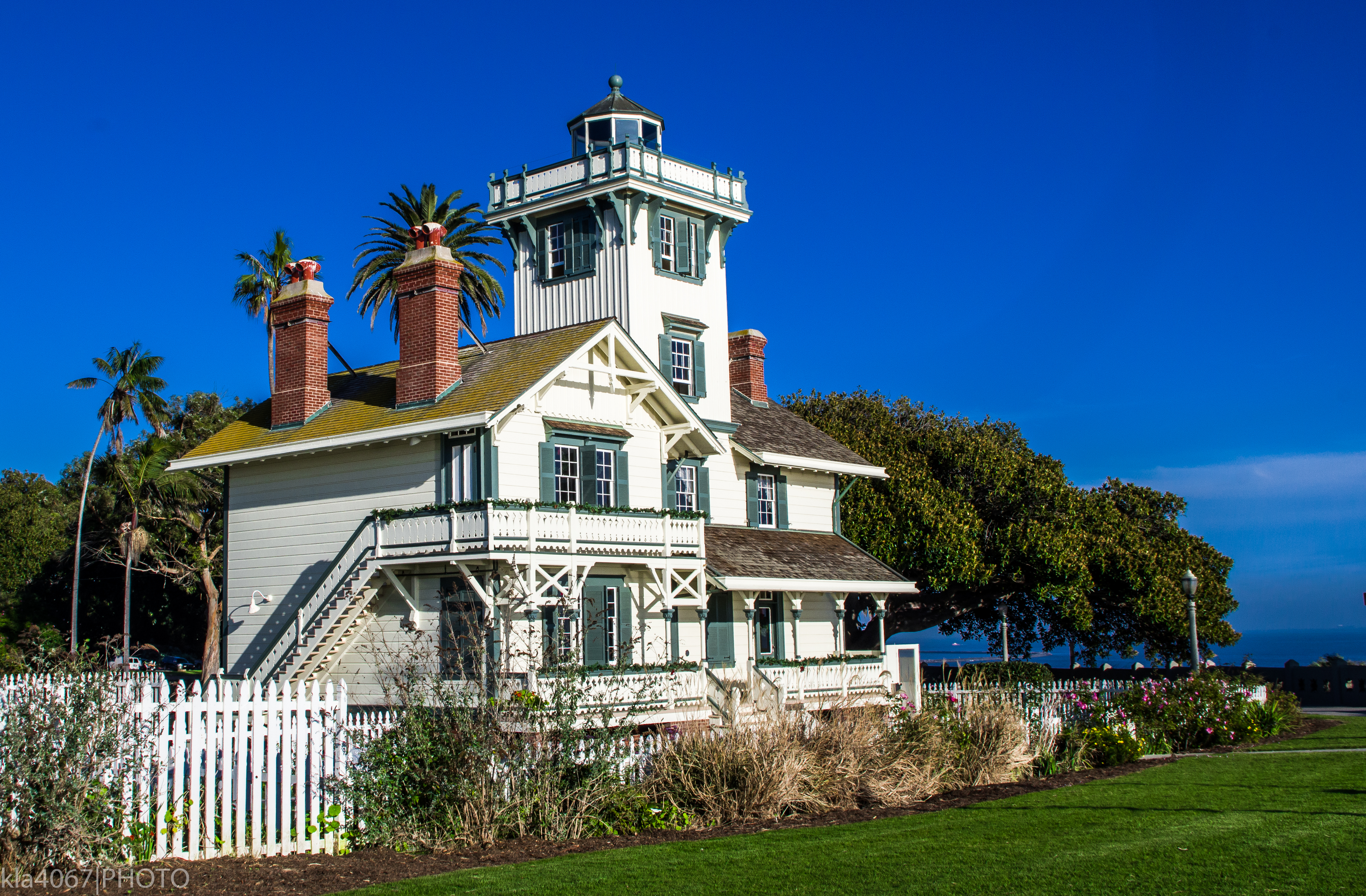
Point Fermin Lighthouse

San Pedro, Wilmington, and Terminal Island are the locations of the Port of Los Angeles. The Vincent Thomas Bridge is a 1,500-foot-long (457 m) suspension bridge linking San Pedro with Terminal Island and named after California Assemblyman Vincent Thomas. (It is the fourth longest suspension bridge in California.) Nearby is the Battleship Iowa museum and attraction, the Los Angeles Maritime Museum (the largest maritime museum in California), and the museum ship SS Lane Victory (a fully operational Victory ship of World War II and National Historic Landmark). Ports O' Call Village, a tourist destination, which provided shopping venues, waterfront eateries, was demolished in 2019 to make way for West Harbor, a major waterfront food hall and park under development, slated to open in 2024.

Warehouse 1, the largest warehouse west of Chicago at the time it was built in 1917, is now a California State Historical Landmark, while a historic naval warehouse built in 1944 houses Crafted at the Port of Los Angeles, a permanent craft marketplace.

The Frank Gehry–designed Cabrillo Marine Aquarium had its origins in the old Cabrillo Beach Marine Museum which was located in the historic Bath House at Cabrillo Beach. The Point Fermin Light, a Victorian-era structure built in the late 19th century, is a museum and park on a bluff overlooking the ocean. The Korean Bell of Friendship is a massive bronze memorial bell donated by South Korea in 1976 to the people of Los Angeles. The church of Mary Star of the Sea is a prominent landmark with a steeple-top statue overlooking the harbor.

On 28th Street, between Gaffey Street and Peck Avenue, is a steep section of public roadway. For about 50 feet (15 m), the street climbs at a 33.3% angle, although the rest of the street is less steep.

== Demographics ==
=== Population history ===
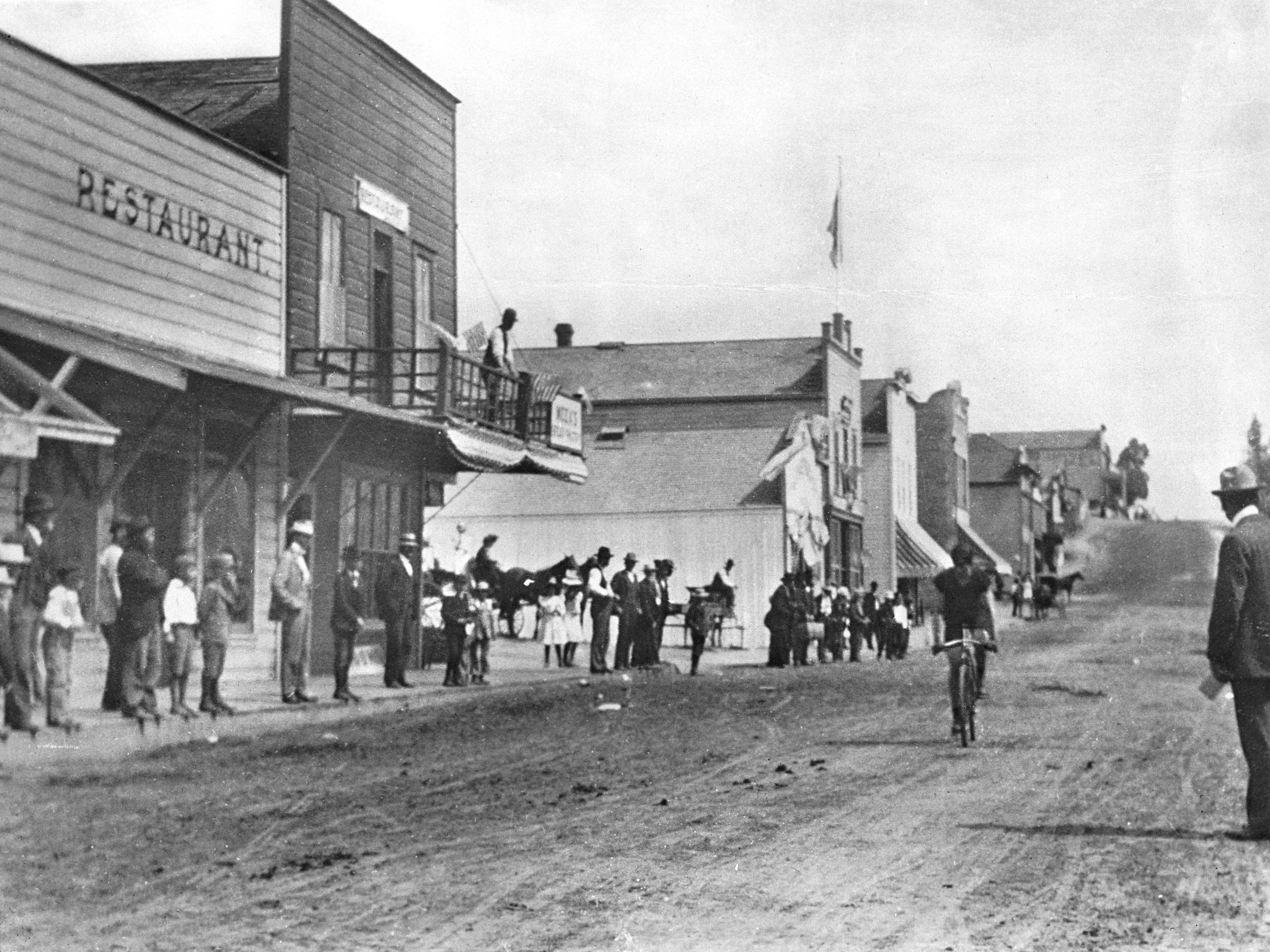
A cyclist on Beacon Street around the time of annexation by Los Angeles in 1909

Ethnically diverse San Pedro was a magnet for European immigrants from various countries for years, reflected in the number of restaurants representing diverse cuisines, especially Croatian, Norwegian, Mexican, Italian, Irish and Greek. San Pedro is home to the largest Italian-American community in Southern California, centered on the "Via Italia" (South Cabrillo Avenue). San Pedro is also considered the heart of the Croatian and Norwegian communities in Los Angeles. The Croatian community, originally composed of seafarers and fishermen from the Dalmatia (especially the islands of Brač, Hvar, Vis and Korčula) region, has been present in San Pedro since the settlement began more than 200 years ago. The City of Los Angeles even named a stretch of 9th Street "Croatian Place" in honor of the city's old Croatian community. The Norwegian presence can be felt in the Barton Hill section of San Pedro and at the Norwegian Seamen's Church.

Until February 1942, San Pedro was home to a vibrant Japanese immigrant community of about 3,000 people who lived in what had been described as a "typical Japanese Fishing Village" on Terminal Island (East San Pedro). These Japanese immigrants pioneered albacore fishing out of San Pedro Bay and harvesting abalone off White Point, thus leading the way in establishing a viable fishing industry in San Pedro. The 48-hour forced expulsion of these San Pedro residents and the razing of their homes and shops, as part of the Japanese-American internment during World War II, is described in Jeanne Wakatsuki Houston's memoir Farewell to Manzanar.

=== 2000 census ===
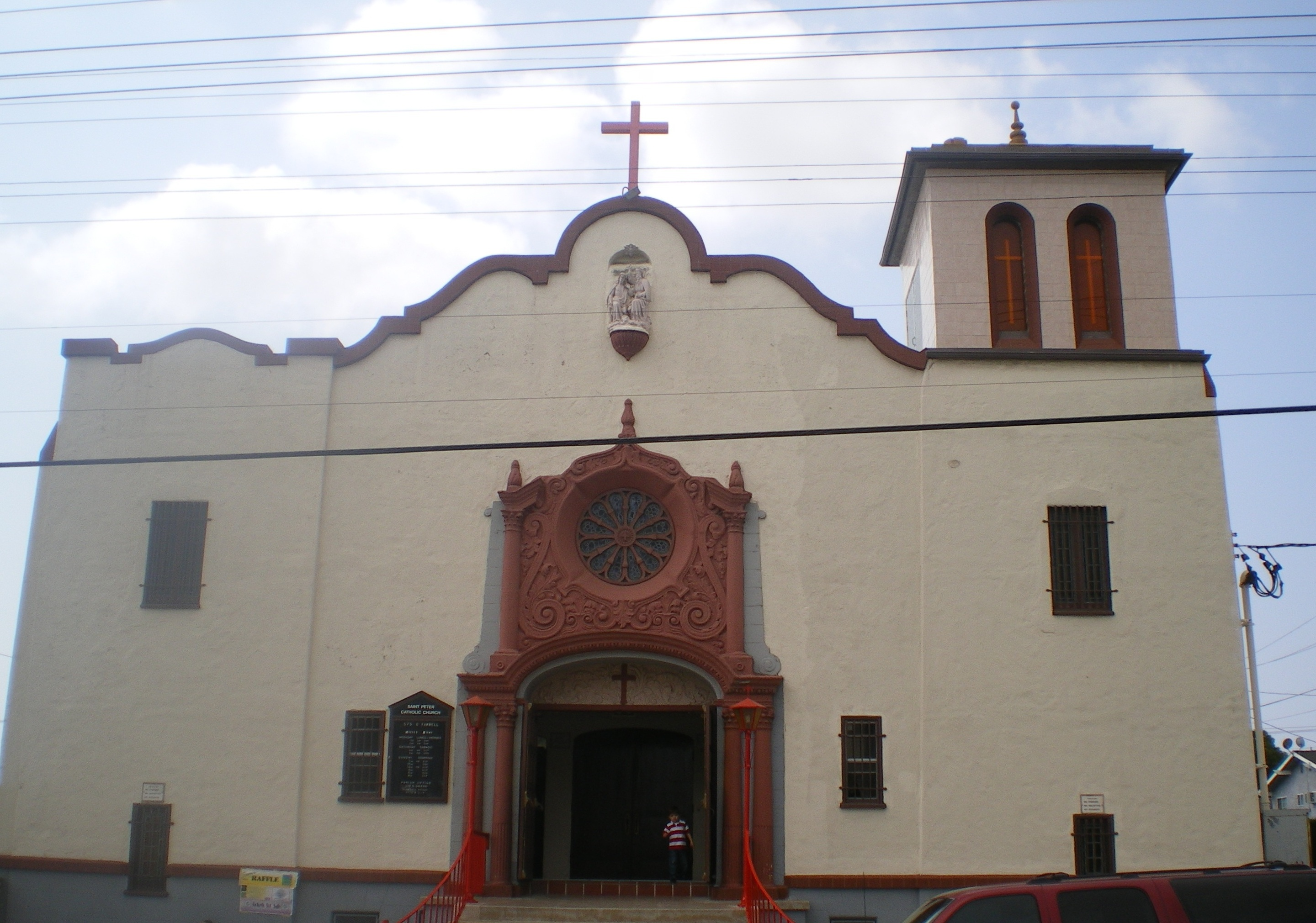
St. Peter Catholic Church.

A total of 80,065 people lived in San Pedro's 12.06 square miles, according to the 2000 U.S. census—averaging 6,640 people per square mile, near Los Angeles' total population density. The median age was 34 in the San Pedro neighborhood, considered average for Los Angeles.

San Pedro is considered highly diverse ethnically, with a diversity index of 63.0. In 2000, whites made up 44.2% of the population, Latinos were at 40.8%, blacks at 6.1%, Asians at 4.8% and others at 4.1%. Mexico and Italy were the most common places of birth for the 24.5% of the residents who were born abroad, considered a low percentage of foreign-born when compared with the city as a whole.

The $57,508 median household income in 2008 dollars was average for the city and county. Renters occupied 56.1% of the housing units, and homeowners occupied the rest. In 2000 there were 3,394 families headed by single parents, or 17.5%, a rate that was average for the county and the city. In the same year there were 6,559 military veterans, or 11% of the population, considered high when compared to the city and county as a whole.

== Transportation ==
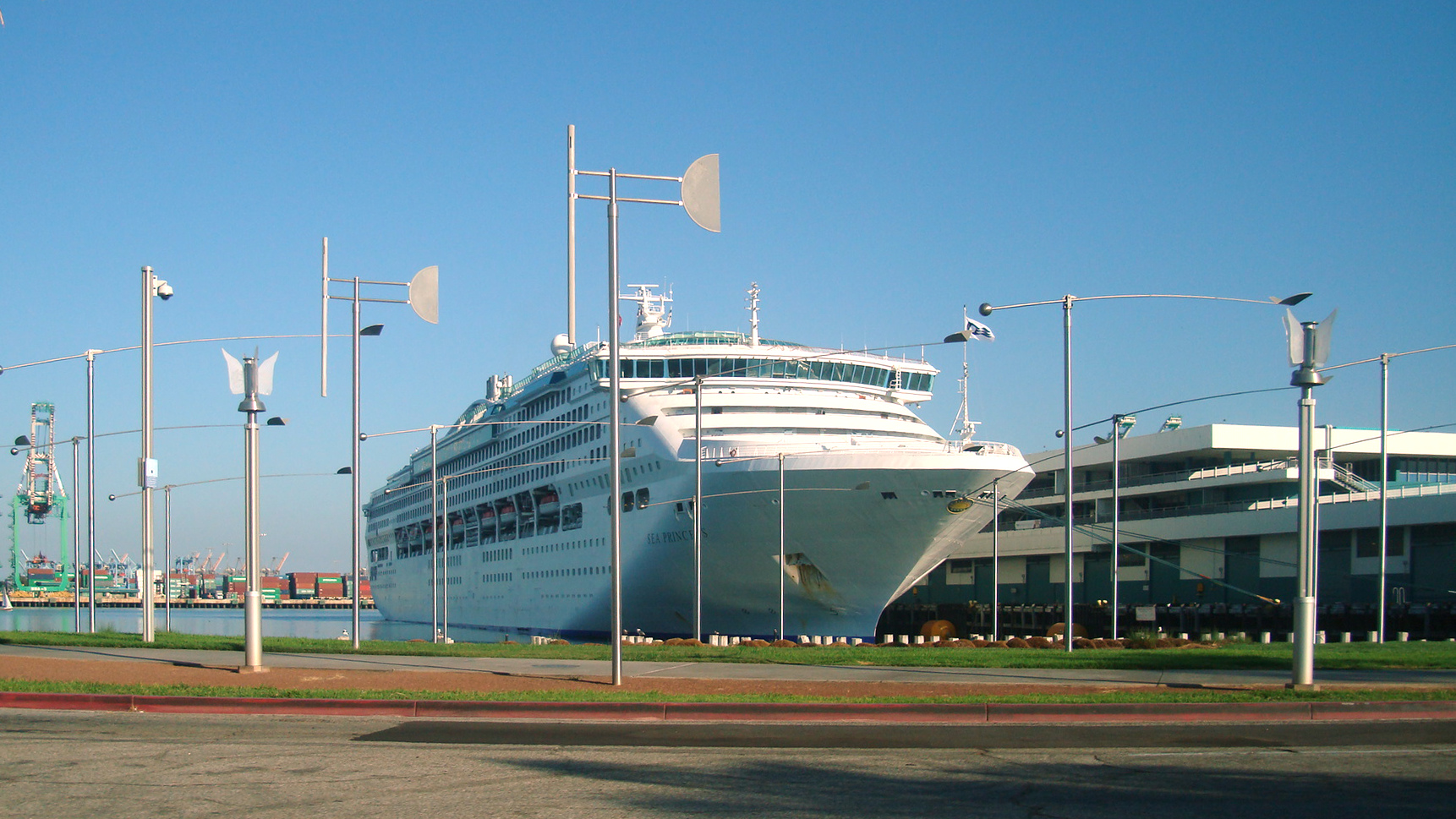
The Sea Princess in Port of LA

San Pedro serves as the southern terminus of Interstate 110, beginning at Gaffey Street heading 20 miles north to Downtown Los Angeles and beyond to Pasadena via the Arroyo Seco Parkway. California State Route 47 heads east from San Pedro across the Vincent Thomas Bridge, connecting San Pedro to Terminal Island, Wilmington, Long Beach, and beyond.

The LA Metro Bus 205 line travel North from 6th and Harbor up to Willowbrook, the LADOT DASH San Pedro line travels up and down Western, and the LADOT Commuter Express travels west to Downtown Long Beach.

=== LA Metro J Line ===
San Pedro

Services
Preceding station	Metro Busway	Following station
Terminus	J Line 950	Pacific Coast Highway (stops en route) toward El Monte
Location

Line 950 of the Los Angeles Metro Busway's J Line terminates in San Pedro. The line runs north to Downtown Los Angeles following the Harbor Freeway (I-110) and Harbor Transitway before following the El Monte Busway along the San Bernardino Freeway (I-10) east to its northeastern terminus in El Monte.

Heading south from Harbor Beacon Park & Ride along Beacon Street, the line turns west along First Street, then south along Pacific Avenue down to its southern terminus at 21st Street. Heading back north, the line turns west on 22nd Street, north on Gaffey Street, and finally east onto 19th Street before once again meeting Pacific Avenue and turning north.

San Pedro stops include:

- Harbor Beacon Park & Ride
- Beacon Street at 1st Street
- Pacific Avenue at 1st Street
- Pacific Avenue at 3rd Street
- Pacific Avenue at 7th Street
- Pacific Avenue at 11th Street
- Pacific Avenue at 15th Street
- Pacific Avenue at 17th Street
- Pacific Avenue at 19th Street (southbound only)
- Pacific Avenue at 21st Street

=== Ports and freight ===
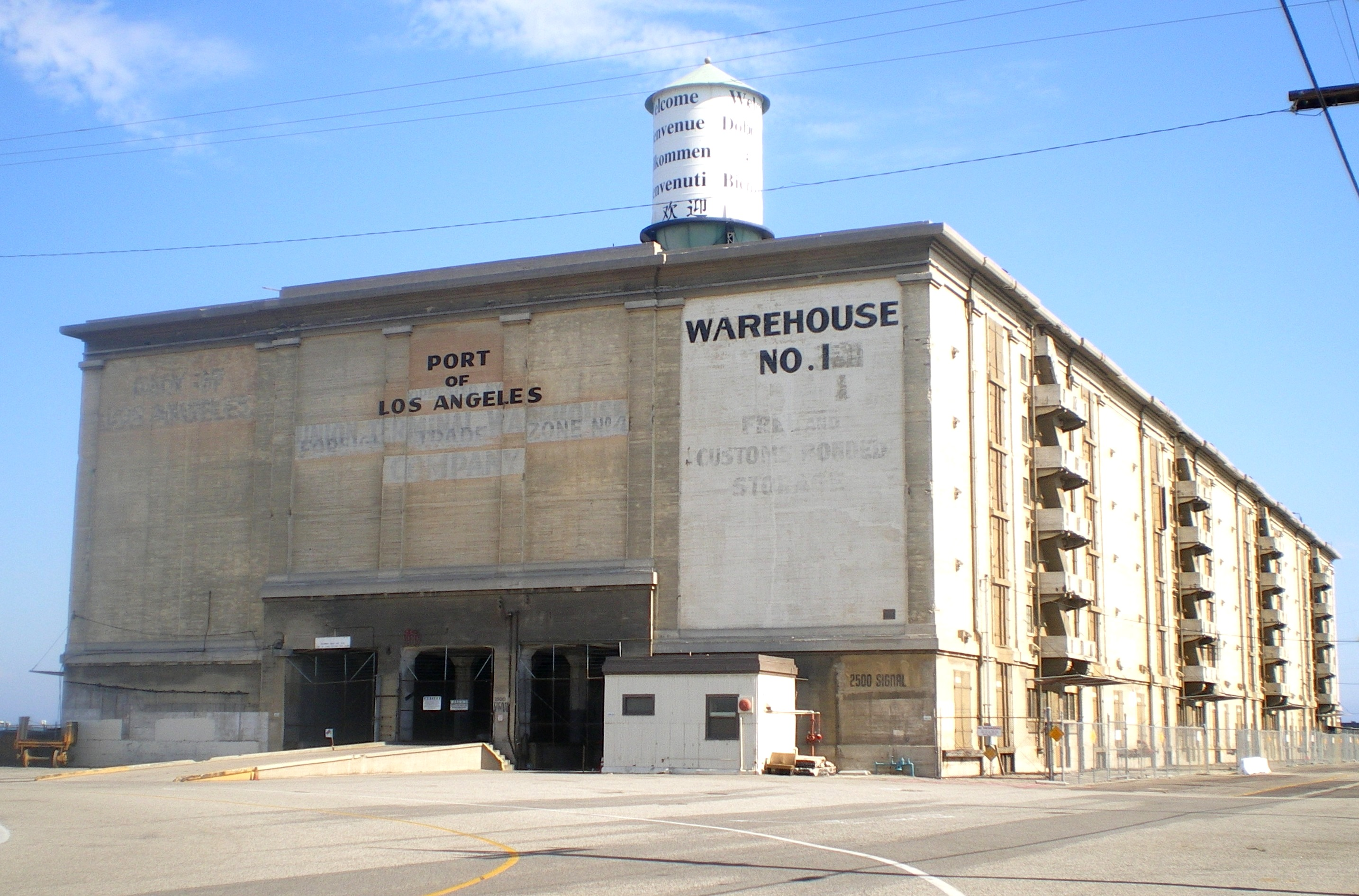
Historic Warehouse No. 1, built in 1917

The Port of Los Angeles is a seaport located in San Pedro Bay and together with the neighboring Port of Long Beach, is promoted as "America's Port" and consistently ranked as the top one and two busiest ports in the Western Hemisphere. The port has 25 cargo terminals, 82 container cranes, 8 container terminals, and 113 miles (182 km) of on-dock rail within 7,500 acres (3,000 ha) of land and water with 43 miles (69 km) of waterfront. The port's top three trading partners were China (including Hong Kong), Japan, and Vietnam.

The World Cruise Center offers cruises up and down the Pacific Coast and beyond aboard cruise lines such as Royal Caribbean and Crystal Cruises, as well as a ferry to Catalina Island via the Catalina Express.

== Government and infrastructure ==
=== City Council and city government ===
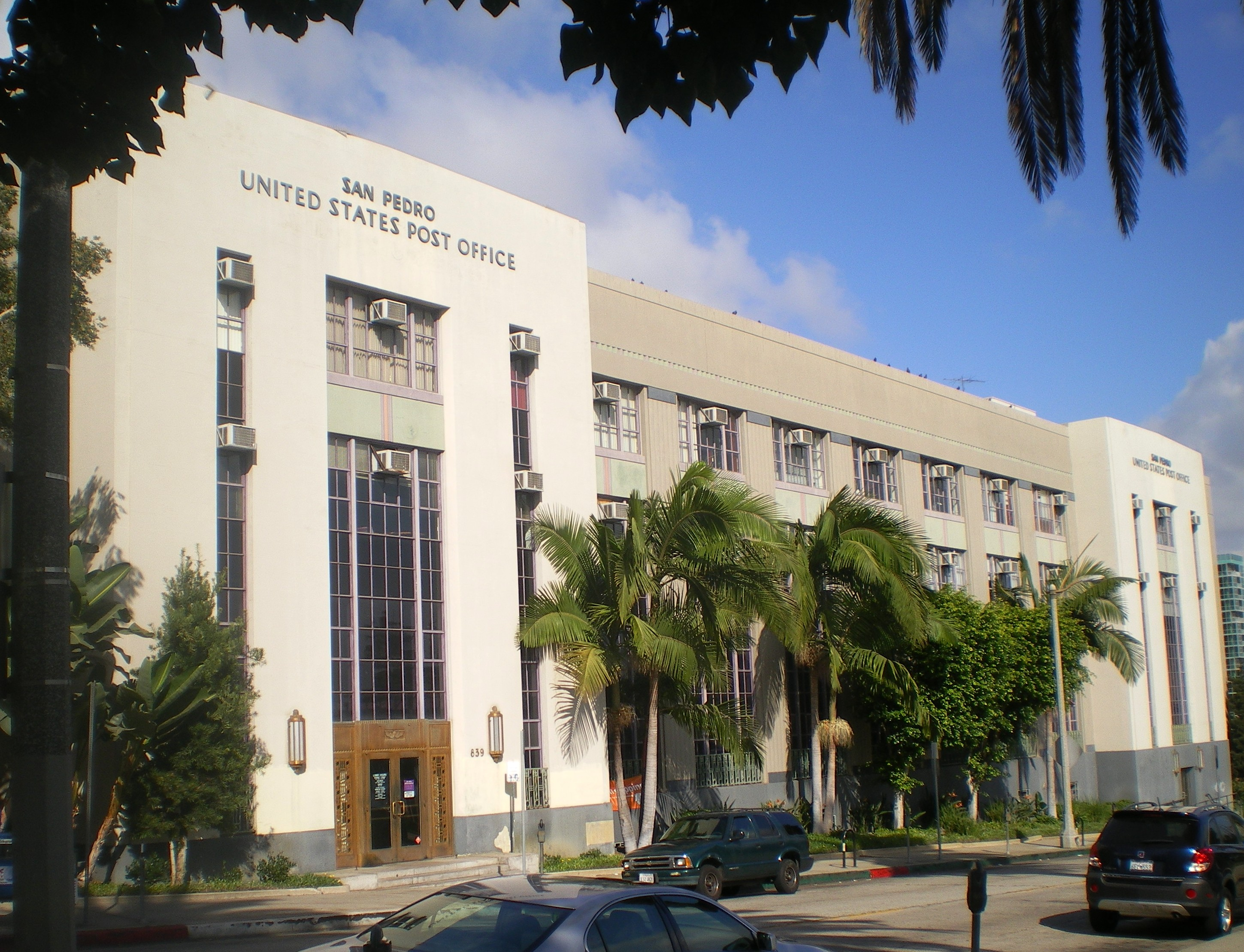
San Pedro Post Office Building

San Pedro anchors the southern end of Los Angeles City Council District 15, which has long been represented only by residents of San Pedro. The neighborhood, according to the Los Angeles Times, "despite accounting for less than one-third of the district's population has enjoyed outsize influence as the district's traditional base of political power."

Los Angeles Animal Services operates the Harbor animal shelter in San Pedro.

=== Federal government ===
The United States Postal Service operates the San Pedro Post Office at 839 South Beacon Street and the Eastview Post Office at 28649 South Western Avenue. The USPS also operates the Seafarers Post Office at Suite A at 93 Berth in close proximity to the San Pedro Post Office.

Fort MacArthur, now a sub-base of Los Angeles Air Force Base, serves as privatized housing and an administrative annex for Department of Defense service members and dependents under the management of Tierra Vista Communities.

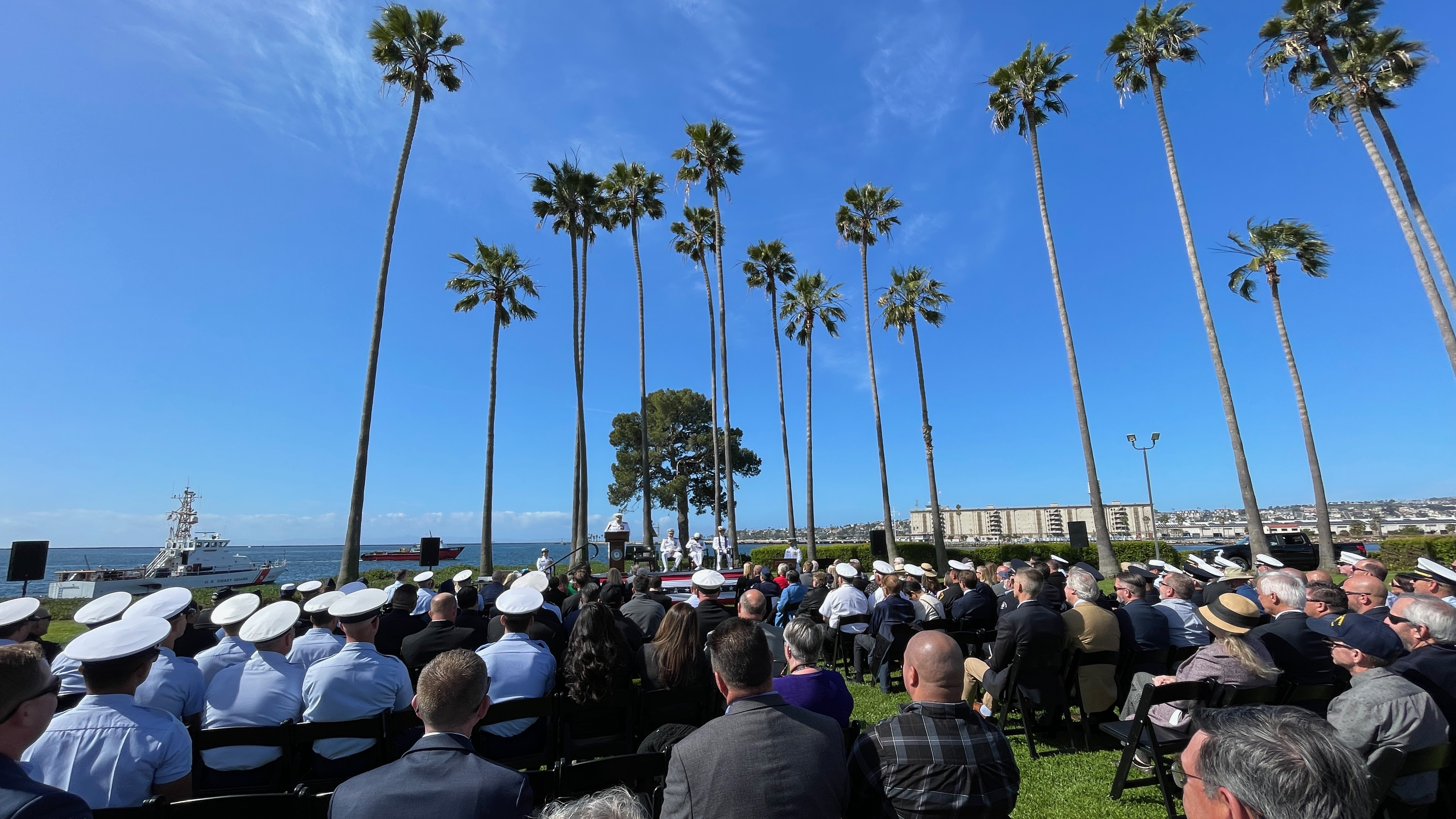
Reservation Point at USCG Base LA/LB, looking across the channel at Warehouse 1

The United States Coast Guard's Sector Los Angeles-Long Beach is based at Coast Guard Base LA/LB on Terminal Island in San Pedro. Base LA/LB is home to many tenant commands including Aids to Navigation Team LA/LB, Maritime Safety and Security Team 91103, Port Security Unit 311, CGIS Pacific Region DET, CG Motion Picture Office, 4 Sentinel-class Fast Response Cutters, the USCGC Argus Offshore Patrol Cutter, USCGC George Cobb Coastal Buoy Tender, CG Boat Station LA/LB, as well as supporting marine units of U.S. Customs and Border Protection, Los Angeles County Lifeguards, and LA Sheriffs.

The Federal Bureau of Prisons operates the Federal Correctional Institution, Terminal Island on Terminal Island and in San Pedro.

== Education ==
Just 23.8% of San Pedro residents aged 25 or older had completed a four-year degree in 2000, about average when compared with the city and the county at large, and the percentage of those residents with more than a high school diploma was high for the county.

=== Primary and secondary schools ===
San Pedro is served by the Los Angeles Unified School District. The area is within Board District 7. As of 2023, Tanya Ortiz Franklin represents the district.

San Pedro High School, Mary Star of the Sea High School, and the Port of Los Angeles High School are the primary high schools within the region. San Pedro High School is home to the protected landmarks in the form of The English Language Arts and Administration Buildings (c. 1939, 1936, resp.). The school celebrated its 100-year anniversary in 2003. It is home to both the Marine Science and Police Academy Magnet programs. Port of Los Angeles High School is a public charter high school, fusing a college preparatory program with elective coursework in International Business and Maritime Studies. Such studies reinforce the significant impact of California's ports on the global economy and international trade.

As of 2010, test scores tended to be higher in the area's elementary schools than in its middle and high schools.

Under certain specific circumstances, residents of San Pedro may be admitted into schools in the Palos Verdes Peninsula Unified School District located in the neighboring Palos Verdes Peninsula; specifically they may attend Miraleste Intermediate School and Palos Verdes High School. This admittance is only granted if a student's parent or guardian is enlisted in the US military, has a parent or guardian employed within the Palos Verdes Peninsula, has a grandparent residing within the Palos Verdes Peninsula, or if the student simply lives in a closer vicinity to a PVPUSD school than any other LAUSD schools.

Primary schools (Grades 1–5)

- 15th Street Elementary
- Bandini Elementary
- Barton Hill Elementary
- Cabrillo Early Education Center
- Cabrillo Elementary
- Leland Elementary
- Park Western Harbor Magnet
- Point Fermin Marine Science Magnet
- San Pedro/Wilmington Early Education Center
- South Shores Magnet for the Visual and Performing Arts Elementary School
- Taper Elementary
- Taper Avenue Elementary Technology Magnet Center
- White Point Elementary
- Crestwood Elementary
- 7th Street Elementary

Secondary schools (Grades 6–12)

- Dana Middle School
- Dodson Middle School (though actually located in Rancho Palos Verdes it is part of LAUSD)
- San Pedro High School
  - San Pedro High School Marine Science Magnet
  - San Pedro High School Police Academy
- Port of Los Angeles High School

Continuation schools

- Angel's Gate Continuation High
- Cooper Community Day School
- Harbor Community Adult School
- Harbor Occupational Center

Private schools

Private schools in San Pedro include:

Grades Preschool–8

- Holy Trinity School—Roman Catholic Archdiocese of Los Angeles
- Christ Lutheran Church and School

Grades 1–8

- Mary Star of the Sea Elementary School—Roman Catholic Archdiocese of Los Angeles

Grades 6–12

- Rolling Hills Estates Preparatory School—the current location opened on February 6, 2007.

Grades 9–12

- Mary Star of the Sea High School—Roman Catholic Archdiocese of Los Angeles

=== Libraries ===
The Los Angeles Public Library operates the San Pedro Regional Branch Library at 931 South Gaffey Street. The late Los Angeles Mayor Tom Bradley attended its opening in 1983.

== Media ==
San Pedro News-Pilot, a newspaper, closed in 1998.

== Events ==
- Annual "Shakespeare by the Sea, Los Angeles" Festival, held at Point Fermin Park each summer.

== Notable people ==
Rudecinda Chapel at Harbor View Cemetery is the burial place of Rudecinda Sepúlveda de Dodson, the "fairy godmother of San Pedro".

== In popular culture ==
- Chinatown (1974 film)
- A Few Good Men (1992 film) (at USCG Sector LA/LB to portray Guantanamo)
- The Usual Suspects (1995 film)
- Fight Club (1999 film)
- Gone in 60 Seconds (2000 film)
- The Fast and the Furious (2001 film)
- Shelter (2007 film)
- Revolution (2012-2014 TV series)
- The Last Ship (2014-2018 TV series)
- A Wrinkle in Time (2018 film)
- Top Gun: Maverick (2022 film)

== See also ==
- List of districts and neighborhoods in Los Angeles
- List of Los Angeles Historic-Cultural Monuments in the Harbor area
- Palos Verdes Peninsula Land Conservancy
- Streetcars in San Pedro
