= Dominguez, California =

Dominguez, California may refer to:

- Dominguez Hills (mountain range)
- Rancho Dominguez, California
- West Rancho Dominguez, California
- East Rancho Dominguez, California
