= Rancho Dominguez, California =

Unincorporated community in California, United States

Coordinates: 33.8496°N 118.2255°W

Rancho Dominguez is an unincorporated community in Los Angeles County, California, United States. Rancho Dominguez is located between the cities of Compton, Long Beach and Carson.

The communities of unincorporated Rancho Dominguez are: Rancho Dominguez, East Rancho Dominguez, and West Rancho Dominguez. Prior to earlier partitioning, Rancho Dominguez also contained the sites of the cities of Compton, Carson and a portion of North Long Beach.

== History ==
Originally Rancho Dominguez was a small part of the Spanish land grant Rancho San Pedro, from the King of Spain in 1784. The Dominguez Rancho Adobe Museum on South Alameda Avenue is the historic ranch home of land grantee Juan Dominguez and Manuel Dominguez, the men for whom the area is named. The Dominguez family lived in the home until the 1920s and it is now a retirement home for Claretian Catholic priests.

In the late 1800s most of the southern part of Rancho Dominguez and the land leading down to the Los Angeles Harbor was acquired by the railroad industry. Today these railroad tracks are used for the same purpose, and is a valuable tie between the Port of Los Angeles and Downtown Los Angeles.

Rancho Dominguez was home to California State University, Dominguez Hills. However, when Carson gained cityhood in 1968, it incorporated the Dominguez Hills section of Rancho Dominguez within its city boundaries.

== Present day ==
The Los Angeles County Sheriff Department (LASD) from the Carson Sheriff Station patrols West Rancho Dominguez and Rancho Dominguez. East Rancho Dominguez is patrolled by the Compton Sheriff Station.

== Developments ==
The Dominguez area south of Compton along South Alameda includes the Dominguez Rancho Adobe, the community known as Dominguez, Dominguez Elementary, Dominguez Park, and Rancho Dominguez Preparatory School.

=== Annexation issues ===
The city of Compton has tried multiple times to annex East Rancho Dominguez, sometimes known as East Compton, and it shares Compton's ZIP code of 90221. West Rancho Dominguez shares that same ZIP code but Compton has no interest in annexing that part of unincorporated Los Angeles County due to environmental waste issues with industries and businesses in that region.

The Community of Rancho Dominguez south of Compton is a warehousing and transportation industry area that collects significant tax revenue for the County of Los Angeles.

== See also ==
- Battle of Dominguez Rancho
- Dominguez Hills (mountain range)
