= Carson, California =

City in California, United States

- City
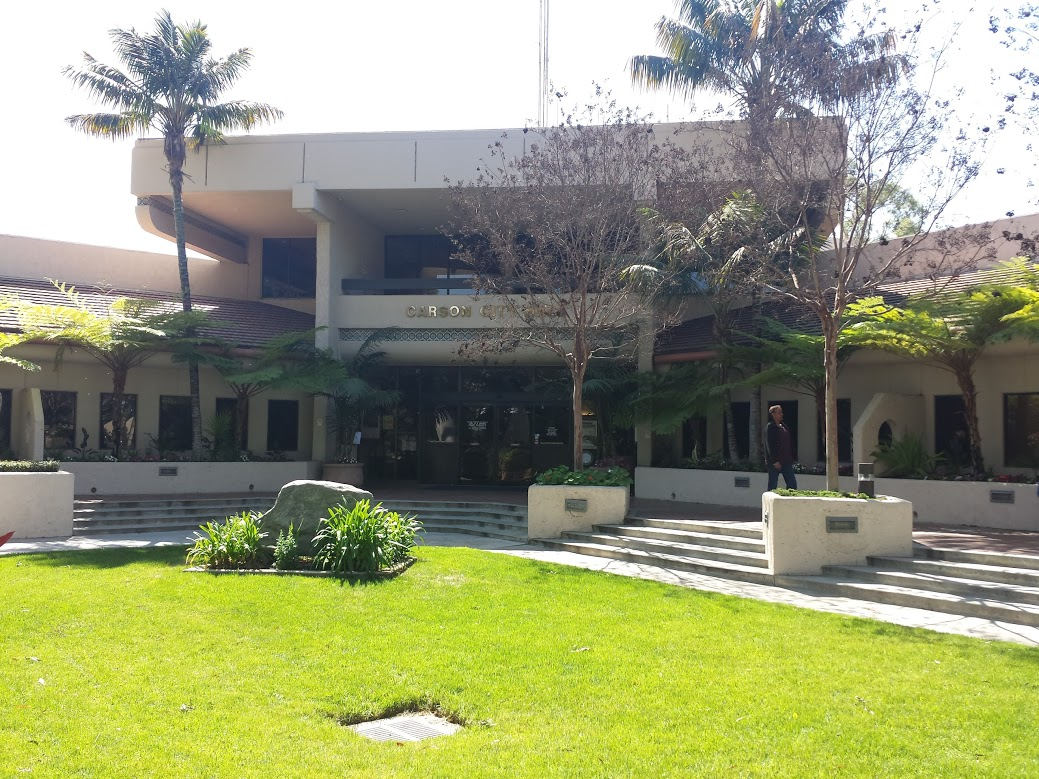
- Carson city hall

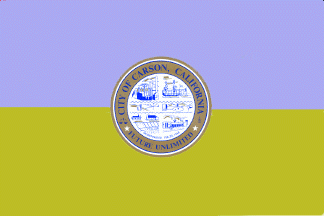
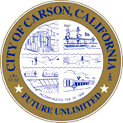
- Flag Seal
- Motto: Future Unlimited
- Interactive map of Carson, California
- Location in the United States Carson (California) Carson (the United States)
- Coordinates: 33°50′23″N 118°15′35″W
- Country: United States
- State: California
- County: Los Angeles
- Incorporated: February 20, 1968

Government
  - Type: Council-Manager
  - City council: Jawane Hilton; Jim Dear; Arleen Bocatija Rojas
  - Mayor: Lula Davis-Holmes
  - Mayor Pro Tem: Cedric L. Hicks Sr.
  - City Treasurer: Monica Cooper
  - City Manager: David C. Roberts Jr.

Area
  - Total: 18.97 sq mi (49.12 km^{2})
  - Land: 18.73 sq mi (48.51 km^{2})
  - Water: 0.24 sq mi (0.61 km^{2}) 1.29%
- Elevation: 39 ft (12 m)

Population (2020)
  - Total: 95,558
  - Rank: 86th in California
  - Density: 5,101.7/sq mi (1,969.77/km^{2})
- Time zone: UTC−8 (Pacific)
  - Summer (DST): UTC−7 (PDT)
- ZIP Codes: 90745–90747, 90749, 90810, 90895
- Area codes: 310/424
- FIPS code: 06-11530
- GNIS feature IDs: 1660441, 2409399
- Website: carsonca.gov

Carson is a city in the South Bay and Harbor regions of Los Angeles County, California, United States, located 13 miles (21 km) south of downtown Los Angeles and approximately 14 miles (23 km) from Los Angeles International Airport. It was incorporated on February 20, 1968. The city is locally known for its plurality of Filipino-Americans and immigrants. As of the 2020 United States census, the city had a population of 95,558.

== History ==
For thousands of years before the arrival of the first Europeans, Tongva Indians lived in the area. Carson lies on part of the Spanish land grant Rancho San Pedro, from the King of Spain in 1784. The Dominguez Rancho Adobe Museum on Alameda Street in Compton (not far from Carson's city limits) is the historic ranch home of the grantees Juan Dominguez and Manuel Dominguez. Carson was named after George Henry Carson, who married a daughter of the Dominguez family in 1857 and managed the rancho.

The first oil drilling took place in 1921 at Dominguez Hill, on the northwest side of the Rancho San Pedro (also called Rancho Domínguez), site of the famous battle during the Mexican–American War called the Battle of Rancho Domínguez in 1846. The mineral rights to this property were owned by Carson Estate Company, the Hellman family, the Dominguez Estate Company, and the Burnham Exploration Company of Frederick Russell Burnham. On September 7, 1923, Burnham Exploration partnering with Union Oil brought in the first producer on the site: Callender No. 1-A well at a depth of 4,068 feet (1,240 m) and 1,193 barrels per day (189.7 m^{3}/d).

In 2011, Shell was ordered by the Los Angeles Regional Water Quality Control Board to clean up the Carousel Tract neighborhood after the discovery of benzene and methane gas contamination, as well as soil and groundwater contamination.

In 2021, Carson was subjected to an air pollution event as a result of hydrogen sulfide emanating from the nearby Dominguez Channel.

== Geography ==
According to the United States Census Bureau, Carson has an area of 19.0 square miles (49 km^{2}), 18.7 square miles (48 km^{2}) of it being land and 0.2 square miles (0.52 km^{2}), or 1.29%, being water.

Carson is bordered by West Rancho Dominguez on the north, Rancho Dominguez and Long Beach on the southeast, West Carson on the southwest and Compton to the north.

Bixby Marshland, a 17-acre (7 ha) wetland habitat, is located in Carson.

=== Climate ===
Carson, California

Climate chart (precipitation, max. and min. temperature)
J	F	M	A	M	J	J	A	S	O	N	D
3.3 66 46	3.9 66 48	2.2 67 49	0.8 70 51	0.2 71 55	0.1 74 59	0.1 77 62	0 78 62	0.2 78 61	0.6 75 57	1.2 70 50	2.1 65 46
- █ Average max. and min. temperatures in °F
- █ Precipitation totals in inches
- Source: http://www.weather.com
Metric conversion
J	F	M	A	M	J	J	A	S	O	N	D
83 19 8	99 19 9	56 19 9	19 21 11	5.6 22 13	1.8 23 15	1.3 25 17	0.5 26 17	4.1 26 16	16 24 14	30 21 10	53 18 8
- █ Average max. and min. temperatures in °C
- █ Precipitation totals in mm

Carson experiences a warm-summer Mediterranean climate (Köppen climate classification: Csb), similar to that of the Los Angeles Basin with noticeably cooler temperatures during the summer due to the nearby Pacific Ocean, which is approximately 6 to 8 miles (10 to 13 km) away. Rainfall is scarce during the summer in Carson but receives enough rainfall throughout the year to avoid Köppen's BSh (semi-arid climate). Carson, like many of the Southern California coastal areas, is subject to a late spring/early summer weather phenomenon called "June Gloom." This involves overcast or foggy skies in the morning which yield to sun by early afternoon.

== Demographics ==
=== Racial and ethnic composition ===
Carson, California – Racial and ethnic composition Note: The US Census treats Hispanic/Latino as an ethnic category. This table excludes Latinos from the racial categories and assigns them to a separate category. Hispanics/Latinos may be of any race.
Race / Ethnicity (NH = Non-Hispanic)	Pop 1980	Pop 1990	Pop 2000	Pop 2010	Pop 2020	% 1980	% 1990	% 2000	% 2010	% 2020
White alone (NH)	26,076	18,956	10,767	7,022	6,569	31.71%	22.57%	12.00%	7.66%	6.87%
Black or African American alone (NH)	23,667	21,542	22,485	21,385	21,264	28.78%	25.65%	25.06%	23.32%	22.25%
Native American or Alaska Native alone (NH)	617	341	180	152	185	0.75%	0.41%	0.20%	0.17%	0.19%
Asian alone (NH)	11,505	19,875	19,711	23,105	25,011	13.99%	23.66%	21.97%	25.19%	26.17%
Pacific Islander alone (NH)	11,505	19,875	2,589	2,291	1,585	13.99%	23.66%	2.89%	2.50%	1.66%
Other race alone (NH)	343	228	171	226	484	0.42%	0.27%	0.19%	0.25%	0.51%
Mixed race or Multiracial (NH)	x	x	2,495	2,116	2,817	x	x	2.78%	2.31%	2.95%
Hispanic or Latino (any race)	19,013	23,413	31,332	35,417	37,643	23.12%	27.87%	34.92%	38.62%	39.39%
Total	81,221	83,995	89,730	91,714	95,558	100.00%	100.00%	100.00%	100.00%	100.00%

=== 2000 census ===
As of the census of 2000, there were 89,730 people, 24,648 households and 20,236 families residing in the city. The population density was 4,762.2 inhabitants per square mile (1,838.7/km^{2}). There were 25,337 housing units at an average density of 1,344.7 per square mile (519.2/km^{2}). The racial makeup of the city was 25.69% White, 25.41% Black or African American, 0.56% Native American, 22.27% Asian, 2.99% Pacific Islander, 17.98% from other races, and 5.09% from two or more races. 34.92% of the population were Hispanic or Latino of any race.

According to a 2006 estimate, the median income for a household in the city was $60,457, and the median income for a family was $66,468. Males had a median income of $33,579 versus $31,110 for females. The per capita income for the city was $17,107. About 7.2% of families and 9.3% of the population were below the poverty line, including 10.9% of those under age 18 and 8.6% of those age 65 or over. Carson has the distinction of being the only incorporated city in the United States where the black population has a higher median income than the white population.

Philippines (43.7%) and Mexico (39.3%) are the most common foreign places of birth in Carson.

Irish, German, English, Nigerian and African are the most common ancestries. The most common non-English languages spoken in Carson are Spanish and Tagalog.

=== 2010 census ===
The 2010 United States census reported that Carson had a population of 91,714. The population density was 4,835.2 inhabitants per square mile (1,866.9/km^{2}). The racial makeup of Carson was 21,864 (23.8%) White (7.7% Non-Hispanic White), 21,856 (23.8%) African American, 518 (0.6%) Native American, 23,522 (25.6%) Asian (20.9% Filipino, 0.8% Japanese, 0.8% Korean, 0.5% Chinese, 0.4% Vietnamese, 0.4% Asian Indian, 0.2% Cambodian, 0.1% Pakistani, 0.1% Thai), 2,386 (2.6%) Pacific Islander (2.2% Samoan, 0.2% Guamanian, 0.1% Native Hawaiian), 17,151 (18.7%) from other races, and 4,417 (4.8%) from two or more races. There were 35,417 residents of Hispanic or Latino origin, of any race (38.6%); 32.6% of the population was of Mexican ancestry, 1.1% Salvadoran, 1.0% Guatemalan, 0.6% Puerto Rican, 0.3% Cuban, 0.2% Honduran, 0.2% Peruvian, and 0.2% Ecuadorian.

The Census reported that 90,411 people (98.6% of the population) lived in households, 1,170 (1.3%) lived in non-institutionalized group quarters and 133 (0.1%) were institutionalized.

There were 25,432 households, out of which 10,980 (43.2%) had children under the age of 18 living in them, 14,178 (55.7%) were married couples living together, 4,787 (18.8%) had a female householder with no husband present, 1,761 (6.9%) had a male householder with no wife present. 3,776 households (14.8%) were made up of individuals, and 1,790 (7.0%) had someone living alone who was 65 years of age or older. The average household size was 3.56. There were 20,726 families (81.5% of all households); the average family size was 3.90.

Historical population
Census	Pop.	Note	%±
1960	38,059		—
1970	71,150		86.9%
1980	81,221		14.2%
1990	83,995		3.4%
2000	89,730		6.8%
2010	91,714		2.2%
2020	95,558		4.2%
U.S. Decennial Census

There were 21,992 people (24.0%) under the age of 18, 9,964 people (10.9%) aged 18 to 24, 23,105 people (25.2%) aged 25 to 44, 24,013 people (26.2%) aged 45 to 64, and 12,640 people (13.8%) who were 65 years of age or older. The median age was 37.6 years. For every 100 females, there were 91.9 males. For every 100 females age 18 and over, there were 88.5 males.

There were 26,226 housing units at an average density of 1,382.6 per square mile (533.8/km^{2}), of which 19,529 (76.8%) were owner-occupied, and 5,903 (23.2%) were occupied by renters. The homeowner vacancy rate was 1.3%; the rental vacancy rate was 3.7%. 68,924 people (75.2% of the population) lived in owner-occupied housing units and 21,487 people (23.4%) lived in rental housing units.

=== 2020 census ===
As of the 2020 census, Carson had a population of 95,558. The median age was 42.2 years. 18.7% of residents were under the age of 18 and 19.0% were 65 years of age or older. For every 100 females, there were 91.0 males, and for every 100 females age 18 and over, there were 87.8 males.

100.0% of residents lived in urban areas, while 0.0% lived in rural areas.

There were 27,120 households, of which 35.6% had children under the age of 18 living in them. Of all households, 50.2% were married-couple households, 14.3% had a male householder and no spouse or partner present, and 30.6% had a female householder and no spouse or partner present. About 16.3% of households were made up of individuals, and 8.7% had someone living alone who was 65 years of age or older.

There were 27,699 housing units, of which 2.1% were vacant. The homeowner vacancy rate was 0.5%, and the rental vacancy rate was 2.9%.

The race-alone and non-Hispanic racial breakdown from the 2020 census is shown in the racial and ethnic composition table above.

== Economy ==
=== Top employers ===
As of 2025, the top ten employers in the city were:

Rank	Employer	No. of Employees
1	The Salvation Army	1,438
2	Marathon Refining Logistics Services	1,010
3	Kaiser Foundation Health Plan Inc	1,000
4	Lakeshore Learning	968
5	See's Candy Shops Inc.	576
6	Amazon.Com Services LLC	440
7	Select Staffing	375
7	Los Angeles County Dept of Children and Family	375
9	Pepsico Beverage Sales, LLC	314
10	Dermalogica	309

=== Former companies ===
Nissan previously had its North American headquarters in Carson. The 42-acre (17 ha) property consisted of 13 buildings, with a total of 700,000 square feet (65,000 m^{2}) of office and light industrial space. One of the buildings, a nine-story tower, had the Nissan logo on it. Vincent Roger of the Los Angeles Times wrote that it "was a familiar sight to drivers passing the intersection of the Harbor and San Diego freeways." Around 2006 the company had 1,500 employees at the headquarters. In 2005 a leak revealed that Nissan planned to move its offices to Franklin, Tennessee. In the summer of 2006, the Nissan headquarters completed the move. Over half of the employees chose to stay in the Los Angeles area.

== Arts and culture ==
County of Los Angeles Public Library operates the Carson Regional Library and the Dr. Martin Luther King Library. Both libraries are in Carson.

Carson is the site of California State University, Dominguez Hills (CSUDH). CSUDH is a major commuter school, particularly for students from the surrounding cities of Long Beach, Compton, and the census-designated place of West Carson. It was founded as South Bay College and then renamed California State University at Palos Verdes. It moved to the City of Carson to meet a significant need for higher education opportunities in the largely black middle class suburbs of Los Angeles. Today it is among the most racially diverse campuses in the United States. The student body does not have a racial or ethnic majority.

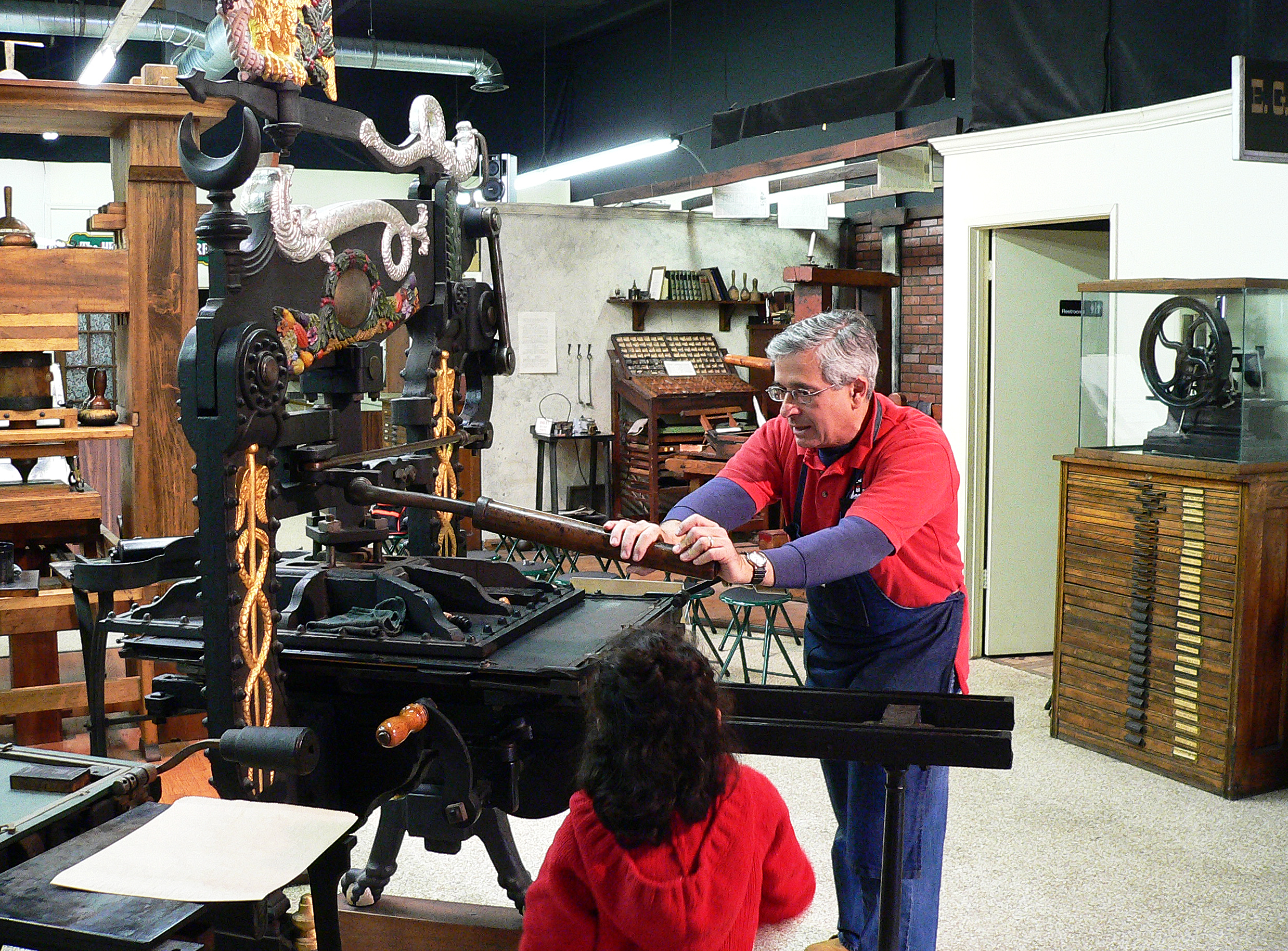
The International Printing Museum in Carson

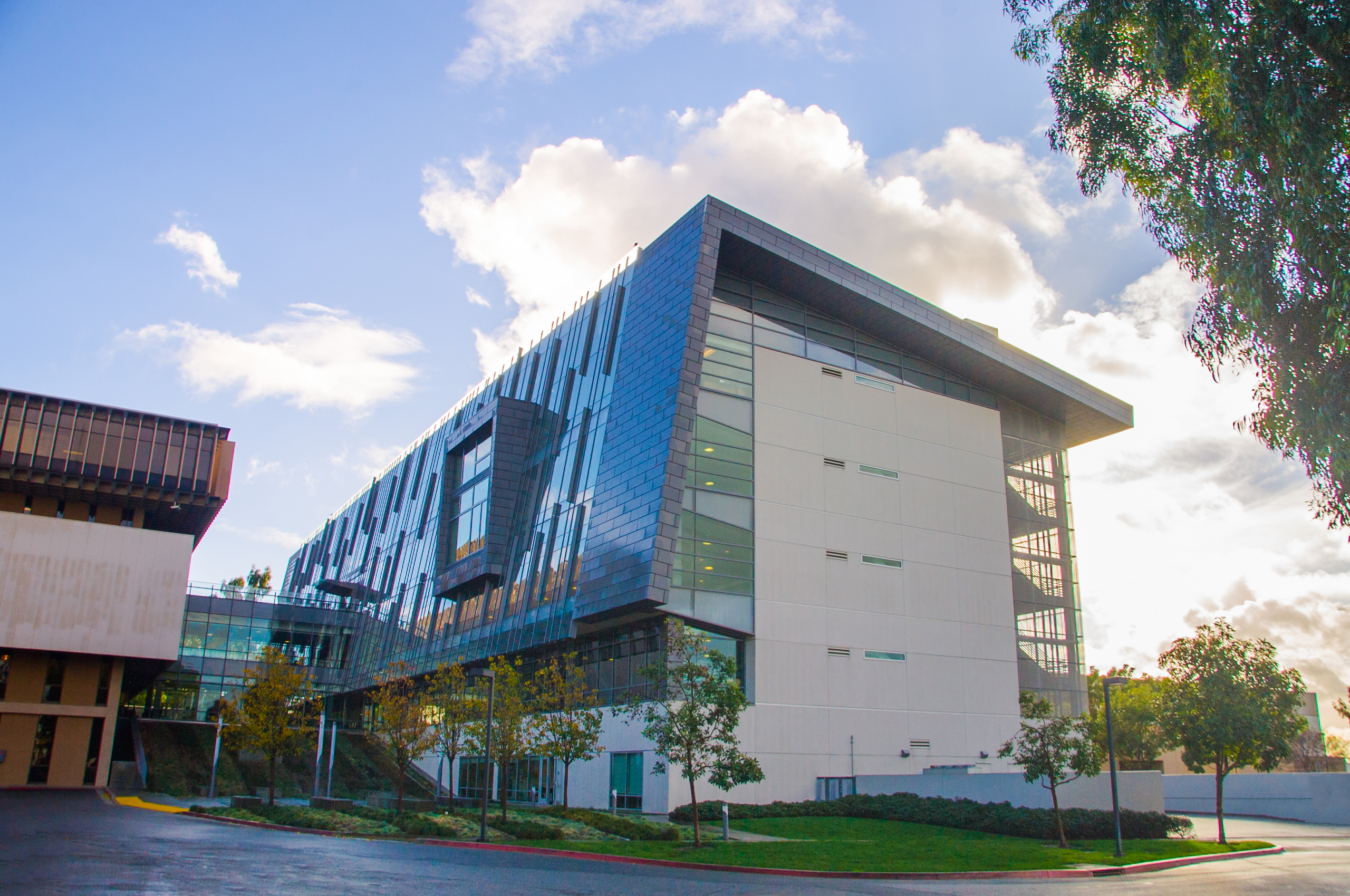
California State University, Dominguez Hills (CSUDH) campus

Carson is also the location of Dignity Health Sports Park, a sports complex including a soccer-specific stadium used by the Los Angeles Galaxy and formerly the Los Angeles Sol, C.D. Chivas USA, and the Los Angeles Chargers of the National Football League (NFL), a tennis stadium which hosted the LA Women's Tennis Championships, and a track and field facility.

Carson Mall, now SouthBay Pavilion, opened in 1973 and is located at the Avalon Boulevard exit off the San Diego Freeway (Interstate 405).

One of the three US-based Goodyear blimps, Wingfoot Three, is based in Carson at the Goodyear Blimp Base Airport.

== Sports ==
One professional sports team currently plays their home games in Carson:

Club	League	Venue	Established	Championships
LA Galaxy	Major League Soccer	Dignity Health Sports Park	1995 (2003 in Carson)	6

The Los Angeles Chargers of the NFL played their home games in Carson from 2017 to 2019.

=== 2028 Summer Olympics and Paralympics ===
During the 2028 Summer Olympics, Carson will host Rugby sevens, archery, tennis, field hockey and track cycling. During the 2028 Summer Paralympics, Carson will host wheelchair tennis, track cycling and archery.

=== Previous NFL stadium proposals ===
As Carson has large tracts of undeveloped land, unusual for a city in such close proximity to metropolitan Los Angeles, various plans for the use of the land have been proposed. One such tract of land located at Del Amo Boulevard, west of the 405, attracted particular attention in the past as a potential site for a National Football League stadium. An outdoor power center complex called Carson Marketplace was originally planned for the site. In February 2015, however, the Marketplace plans were scrapped in favor of a $1.2 billion NFL stadium, backed by Goldman Sachs, that would have hosted both the then-Oakland Raiders and the then-San Diego Chargers. The NFL had previously considered the site as a location for a stadium, but the plans stalled after it was discovered that the site was once used as a toxic waste dump and would require an extensive clean-up operation before construction was legally allowed to commence. In May 2015, the Carson City Council allocated $50 million to clean up the site for either the dual NFL stadium or the originally planned Carson Marketplace as a fallback should the NFL stadium not come to fruition.

On January 12, 2016, NFL owners rejected Carson's bid to host an NFL stadium in favor of the competing bid of SoFi Stadium in Inglewood backed by Rams owner Stan Kroenke.

== Government ==
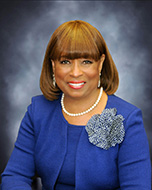
Lula Davis-Holmes, mayor of Carson

=== Municipal government ===
According to the city's most recent Comprehensive Annual Financial Report, the city's various funds had $96.3 million in revenues, $81.8 million in expenditures, $611.4 million in total assets, $129.2 million in total liabilities, and $187.2 million in cash and investments.

=== State and federal representation ===
In the California State Legislature, Carson is in the 35th senatorial district, represented by Democrat Laura Richardson, and in the 69th Assembly district, represented by Democrat Josh Lowenthal.

In the United States House of Representatives, Carson is in California's 44th congressional district, represented by Democrat Nanette Barragán.

=== County government ===
Los Angeles County Animal Care Services operates the Carson/Gardena Animal Care Center in Carson (the facility's mailing address says "Gardena, CA").

== Education ==
=== Primary and secondary schools ===
Most of Carson is served by the Los Angeles Unified School District. A portion of Carson is in the Compton Unified School District.

High schools serving LAUSD portions of Carson include Carson High School in Carson, Rancho Dominguez Preparatory School in Long Beach, and Banning High School in the Wilmington area of Los Angeles. The area is within Board District 8.

Magnolia Science Academy-3, a public span school (serving grades 6–12) in Carson, is a Magnolia Public Schools campus.

Circa 2019 there were plans to open a campus of the charter school Ganas Academy on the campus of the LAUSD public school Catskill Avenue Elementary School, but there was opposition to this move.

Although the California Academy of Mathematics and Science is located in Carson on the campus of California State University, Dominguez Hills, it is actually a part of the Long Beach Unified School District. The school accepts residents of LBUSD, Compton USD, portions of LAUSD (including sections serving Carson), and other districts.

=== Public libraries ===
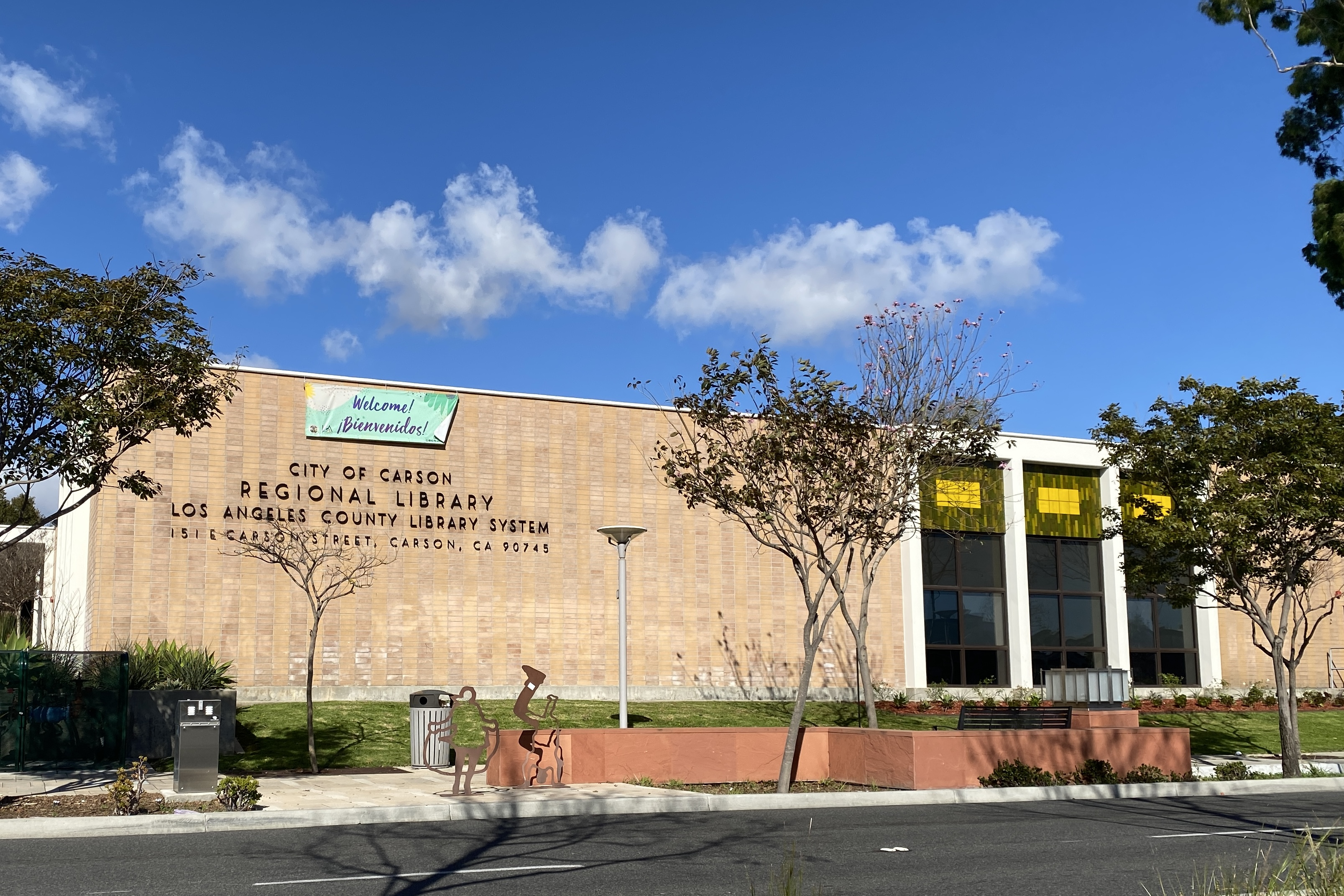
Carson Branch Library

LA County Library operates the Carson Branch.

== Infrastructure ==
=== Emergency services ===
Fire protection in Carson is provided by the Los Angeles County Fire Department which operates out of Fire Stations 10, 36, 105, 116, and 127. Ambulance transportation is provided by McCormick Ambulance Service Station 17. The Los Angeles County Sheriff's Department (LASD) operates the Carson Station in Carson.

=== Health care ===
The Los Angeles County Department of Health Services operates the Torrance Health Center in Harbor Gateway, Los Angeles, near Torrance and serving Carson.

=== Transportation ===
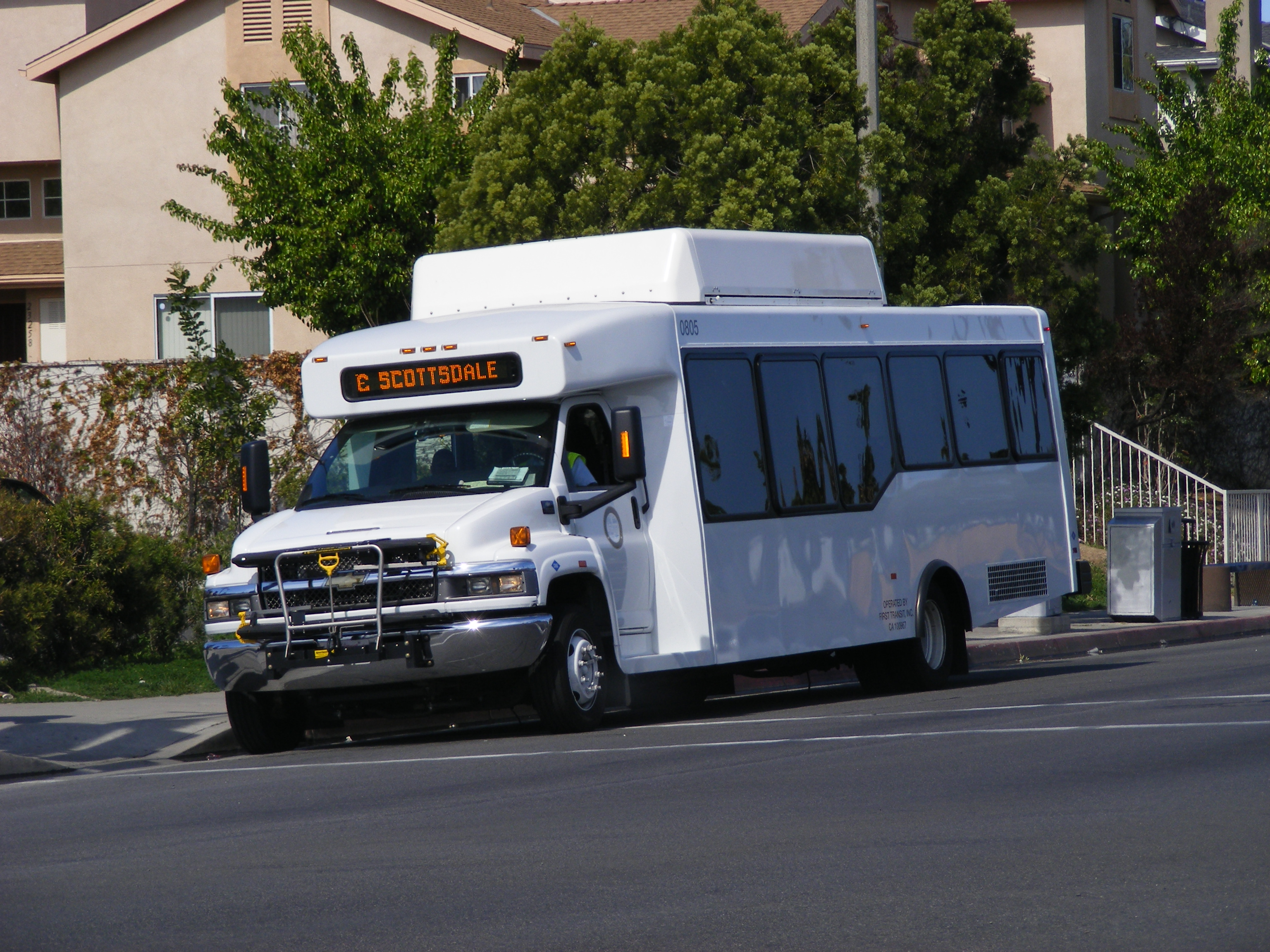
Carson Circuit bus

Prior to the COVID-19 pandemic, the city operated the Carson Circuit bus that serves the local community and connects to other bus and rail transit services including the Los Angeles Metro A Line at the Del Amo Station. Service was suspended on March 28, 2020. However, their Dial-A-Ride services remained operational during that time.

Historically, the city was served by the Pacific Electric Long Beach Line.

== Notable people ==
- Ab-Soul, rapper and member of group Black Hippy
- Justin Bibbins, basketball player
- Bishop Lamont, rapper
- Boo-Yaa T.R.I.B.E., hip hop band
- Chuckii Booker, singer, songwriter
- The Boys, R&B band
- Brandy, singer/actress
- Chad Brown, former National Football League (NFL) referee
- Dave Canales, NFL head coach
- Josh Christopher (born 2001), basketball player in the Israeli Basketball Premier League, formerly in the NBA
- Antwuan Dixon, professional skateboarder
- Dr. Dre (Andre Young Sr.), rapper/producer, lived in Carson during his middle school years
- Cameron Dunbar, soccer player
- Rocky Fellers, pioneer Asian-American pop/rock band of four young Filipino brothers during the 1960s with multiple hits including the 1963 chart-topper "Killer Joe".
- Vince Ferragamo, NFL quarterback for Los Angeles Rams 1977–86, Super Bowl XIV, played for No. 1-ranked Nebraska 1976, an Academic All American, was LA City's MVP 1972
- The Game (Jayceon Taylor), rapper, lived in Carson age 7 to 15 while in foster care
- Courtney Hall, former San Diego Chargers center and guard 1989–1999
- Ekene Ibekwe, University of Maryland basketball forward, 2012 and 2016 Olympian (Nigerian Basketball National Team)
- Ras Kass, rapper
- Baby Keem, rapper
- Tommy "Tiny" Lister, actor, NCAA shot put champion and former professional wrestler
- A$ton Matthews, rapper
- Juanita Millender-McDonald, Democratic U.S. Congresswoman from 1996 to 2007
- Uchenna Nwosu, NFL Linebacker, 2025 Seattle Seahawks season, Super Bowl Champ
- Kyla Pratt, actress
- Michael Quercio, musician
- Ray J (Willie Norwood Jr.), singer/actor
- Reason, rapper
- Danny Reece, NFL cornerback and punt returner, Tampa Bay Buccaneers 1976–1980, punt return leader 1979 and 1980
- Kris Richard, NFL player and coach
- Albert Robles, mayor of Carson from 2015 until 2020
- Rex Salas, musician
- Ashton Sanders, actor
- Demetrius Shipp Jr., actor
- Gilbert D. Smith, first African-American mayor of Carson
- SoShy (Deborah Epstein), French singer and songwriter
- Kia Stevens, also known as Awesome Kong and Amazing Kong in TNA Wrestling, and Kharma in WWE, professional wrestler
- Tammy Townsend, television actress
- Wesley Walker, NFL wide receiver, NY Jets 1977–1989
- Elbert Watts, Green Bay Packers defensive back 1986
- Forest Whitaker, director, producer, and Academy Award-winning actor
- Bob Whitfield, Stanford University graduate, NFL offensive lineman, Atlanta Falcons, New York Giants and Jacksonville Jaguars
- Brett Young, football player
- James Anderson Jr., first African-American Marine to receive the Medal of Honor
- J. R. Redmond, Former running back in the NFL, Oakland Raiders and 2001 (AFC) champions and 2002 Superbowl XXXVI champions New England Patriots, professional football player

== In popular culture ==
- Jackie Brown
- Gone in 60 Seconds (1974 Version)
- Emergency! (Exteriors of the then-fictional 'Station 51' of the series. The station shown is Station 127 of the Los Angeles County Fire Department)
- Pros vs. Joes
- 10 Items or Less
- Larry Crowne

== Sister cities ==
Carson's sister cities are:

- La Carlota, Philippines
- Muntinlupa, Philippines
- Parañaque, Philippines
- Sōka, Japan
- Taguig, Philippines
- Wanju County, South Korea

== See also ==
- George Henry Carson
- List of cities in Los Angeles County, California
- Demographics of Filipino Americans
