= Manuel Dominguez =

Mexican Californio rancher and politician (1803–1882)

Manuel Domínguez
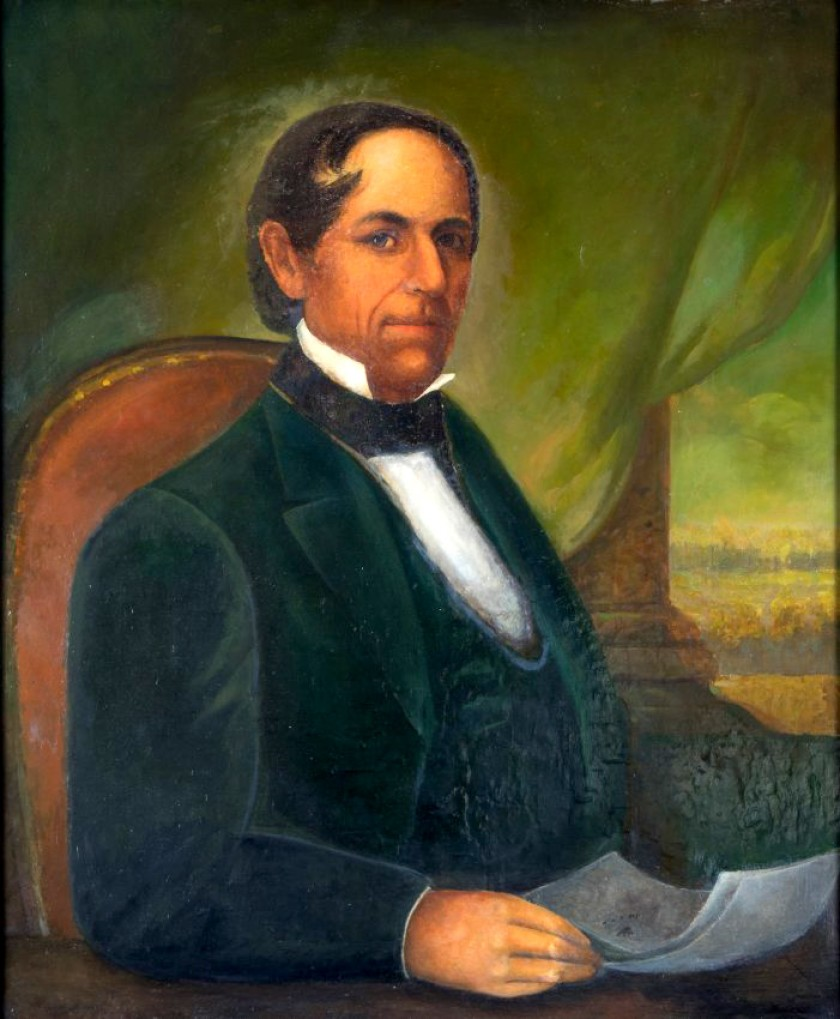
- Portrait held at the Dominguez Rancho Adobe

Alcalde of Los Angeles
- In office 1832–1833
- Preceded by: Vicente Sánchez
- Succeeded by: José Antonio Carrillo
- In office 1842–1843
- Preceded by: Ygnacio Palomares
- Succeeded by: Manuel Requena

Personal details
- Born: January 26, 1803 San Diego, California
- Died: October 11, 1882 (aged 79) Los Angeles, California
- Occupation: Politician, ranchero

Don Manuel Domínguez e Ybáñez (1803–1882) was a Californio ranchero, politician, and a signer of the California Constitution in 1849. He served as two terms as Alcalde of Los Angeles (mayor). He was one of the largest landowners in Southern California, having inherited Rancho San Pedro in 1825, one of the largest ranchos in California. He was one of the founders of the cities of Carson and Compton and of the fishing village of San Pedro (today a neighborhood of Los Angeles). Today, California State University, Dominguez Hills and the communities of Rancho Dominguez, East Rancho Dominguez, and West Rancho Dominguez bear his family's name.

== Early life ==
Manuel Dominguez, addressed as Don Manuel, was born January 26, 1803, in the colonial Las Californias province of the Spanish Viceroyalty of New Spain (colonial México). He was born into a prominent Alta California family. In the colonial Spanish racial classification system sistema de castas he was an Español Criollo. The gente de razón family traced itself through pure blood generations in Mexico to ancestors in Catalonia Spain. He was baptized Luis Gonzaga Policarpo Manuel Antonio y Fernando Dominguez. (Note: January 26 was San Policarpo feast day.) Baptismal data at Yglesia del Real Presidio de San Diego indicates father as Christobal (Note: Often spelled Cristobal, sometimes Cristoval.) Dominguez of military status: Cabo de la compañia de cuera deste Presidio and mother as Maria Reyes Yvañez. Godparents are shown as Maria Gorgona Valencuela and Manuel Rodriguez.

Manuel’s father was José Cristobal Dominguez (c. 1761-January 6, 1825) and his mother was Maria de Los Reyes Ybanez (c.1763-February 5, 1834). Existing records do not identify the names of Manuel’s grandparents. Manuel’s granduncle, the brother of his grandfather, was Juan Jose Dominguez (c.1736-1809). The father of Juan Jose was Jose Ignacio Dominguez. Juan Jose was the original holder of the vast Spanish land concession known as the Rancho San Pedro. Juan Jose never married and died in 1809 leaving his nephew Cristobal, Manuel’s father, heir. Upon the death of Cristobal in 1825, Manuel and his surviving siblings inherited the rancho. The siblings of Manuel Dominguez were Maria Jesus (1796-1799), Josef de Los Dolores (1798-1819), Maria Victoria (1800-1873), Francisca Marcelina (1805-1828), Maria Elena Ramona (1807-1842), Jose Nasario (1809-1860), Pedro Juan Santiago Pectinarzo “Agapito” (1812-1859) and Maria Sinforosa (1815-1820).

Manuel Dominguez was described as tall, handsome, intelligent and personable. He was a faithful Roman Catholic and insisted his family observe the rituals. As was customary, he was trained as a youth in horsemanship and herding stock on the open range. He learned to read and write Spanish in a time when most people were illiterate. He continued to educate himself through reading throughout his life. He was a master of the Spanish language and he learned to speak English. He became a proficient public speaker capable of using both diplomacy and profanity as warranted.

His life spanned the Spanish, Mexican, and American eras in California.

Manuel Dominguez was an heir to the vast Rancho San Pedro land grant in the Los Angeles Basin. Eldest son of Cristobal Dominguez, he is credited with the solidification of the Rancho San Pedro with a new Mexican land grant and an American patent and with the development of the rancho, and erecting the Dominguez Rancho Adobe as rancho headquarters above the Los Angeles River floodplain in the Dominguez Hills, located on the border between Compton, California and Carson, California.

At the age of 20, he fathered a child (Tomasa) with the 10- or 11-year-old daughter of Santiago Arguello. Manuel Dominguez met the beautiful and talented Maria Engracia de Cota. They fell in love. On December 7, 1827 they were wed at Mission San Gabriel. Maria skillfully managed the business of household and social gatherings. Maria was the daughter of Don Guillermo Cota, Prefect (Commissioner) for the Mexican government. Through this contact Manuel gained an introduction to the political workings of the Pueblo and surrounding area. Maria was also the granddaughter of Manuel Nieto, powerful holder of the large land grant Rancho Los Nietos, to the east of Rancho San Pedro. Together Manuel and Maria had ten children, four of whom died in childhood.

Beginning in 1828, Dominguez embarked on a lengthy career of public service, in addition to his business interests. His political service included Alcalde (Mayor) of the Pueblo de Los Ángeles and Third Prefect of the Southern District of Alta California.

== Rancho San Pedro ==
Manuel Dominguez inherited the Rancho San Pedro in 1825 from his father, Cristóbal Domínguez. Manuel and his two brothers settled on the ranch, building adobe homes. The land was originally granted to his great-uncle, Juan José Domínguez (1736-1809) a Spanish soldier in New Spain. In 1769, with Fernando Rivera y Moncada, he was in the first group that arrived at the site of and founded the Presidio of San Diego in Alta California. Domínguez served with Gaspar de Portolà and Junípero Serra on the Portolà expedition, the first European land exploration of present-day California. It traveled north from San Diego to the San Gabriel Valley, Los Angeles Basin, San Fernando Valley, Monterey Bay, and San Francisco Bay. In 1784, Juan José Domínguez received a land grant grazing concession named Rancho San Pedro, 75,000 acres (300 km^{2}) of land and one of the first in California, by the upper Las Californias military Governor Pedro Fages on behalf of King Charles III of Spain. It included what is today the entire Port of Los Angeles; San Pedro, Los Angeles; Harbor City, Los Angeles; Wilmington, Los Angeles; Carson; Compton; the Dominguez Hills; Lomita; the Palos Verdes Peninsula; Redondo Beach; Hermosa Beach; Manhattan Beach; and Torrance.

The Rancho was regranted by the Mexican government in 1822 after Mexico became independent from Spain. On December 18, 1858 the United States government patented the 43,119 acre claim by Manuel Dominguez.

On May 25, 1869 Manuel Domínguez made a grant to the Los Angeles and San Pedro Railroad of a 100-foot right of way through the Rancho San Pedro. Operation of the Los Angeles and San Pedro Railroad through the Rancho San Pedro began in 1869. Additional right of way from Wilmington to Rattlesnake (Terminal) Island to the Los Angeles and San Pedro Railroad was granted in 1871. This was the forerunner of today's Alameda Corridor, an express route for to and from the Ports of Los Angeles and Long Beach.

=== Ownership disputes ===
Disputes of Manuel Domínguez’s ownership of Rancho San Pedro originated with events that occurred while California was under Spanish rule. When Juan José Domínguez died in 1809 and left half of his estate to Cristóbal Domínguez his nephew, Cristóbal did not aggressively defend his claim.

The executor of the estate, Manuel Gutiérrez, paid off the debts of Juan José and moved in, assuming rights of ownership. Gutiérrez built up the Rancho. He gave Jose Dolores Sepúlveda permission to run cattle on part of the land known as los Palos Verdes. Sepúlveda made improvements and built up his herd.

In 1817 Cristóbal asserted his claim to the estate demanding Sepúlveda remove his cattle. Governor Sola issued a decree that the Rancho was the property of Juan José Domínguez and ordering Sepúlveda to leave. Sepúlveda refused; resulting in a stalemate. Then in 1822 Cristóbal again obtained from Governor Sola a decree assigning him the land. The decree was to be presented personally to the ‘’Ayuntamiento’’ of Los Angeles. This was performed by Manuel Domínguez. Sepúlveda again refused.

Under Mexican rule Juan Dolores Sepúlveda filed a counterclaim based on permission of Gutiérrez, length of residence and substantial improvements to the property. Juan Dolores Sepúlveda died in an Indian revolt. His heirs were children and Manuel Gutiérrez assumed control of operations in their behalf. Doña Sepúlveda, the widow, married Antonio Machado and the family stayed on the Rancho. In 1825 Cristóbal Domínguez died and Manuel Domínguez moved onto the Rancho with his brothers Nasario and Pedro. Manuel kept up his ownership claims. California had become part of Mexico in 1822, Manuel Domínguez sought and received two decrees from Mexican Governor Echeandia for removal of the herds of Machado and Sepúlveda, but Governor Echeandia confused matters by at the same time issuing Sepúlveda a conflicting provisional grant of Rancho de los Palos Verdes. The heirs of Sepúlveda, Machado and Gutiérrez refused the decrees obtained by Manuel Domínguez.

In 1834 Manuel Domínguez, Gutiérrez, and the heirs of Sepúlveda; Juan and José Sepúlveda, presented their claims to Governor José Figueroa. In the Arbitration Decree of 1834 he ruled that despite the decrees to vacate, the Sepúlveda's had taken possession in good faith at a time when Cristóbal Domínguez was not asserting his claim. He awarded them the Palos Verdes area. The remainder of Rancho San Pedro went to Manuel Domínguez. Gutiérrez was given no land ownership but could pasture his herds for the remainder of his life.

In October 1838 Nathaniel Pryor, husband of Teresa Sepúlveda, the brother in law of Juan and José Sepúlveda petitioned the Governor asking for four thousand acres of land belonging to Manuel Domínguez on the east side of Palos Verdes. Governor Alvarado denied the petition, as the land was in private hands. In 1839 Manuel Domínguez submitted, and was granted, a petition for los Palos Verdes, and the Sepúlvedas were ordered to vacate. José and Juan Sepúlveda filed a cross complaint, citing the Arbitration Decree of 1834. In April 1841 Governor Alvarado upheld the Sepúlveda claim, but admonished both parties.

Manuel Domínguez proposed a private settlement. The boundaries between the Ranchos were surveyed. In June 1841, an agreement was signed by the Domínguez family, transferring all rights to los Palos Verdes to the Supelvedas. This effectively ended the dispute between the families.

== Public career ==
Manuel Domíngue held many public offices in his lifetime. In June 1828 he was appointed as Elector de Partido for the Pueblo of Los Angeles. In November 1828 Manuel Domínguez was elected to the Pueblo de Los Angeles El Ilustre Ayuntamento (City Council) under Mexican rule. From January 11 to February 19, 1829 he served as delegate to the first Mexican legislature in Alta California, at San Diego. In 1832, at the age of 29, he was elected Alcalde (Mayor) of the Pueblo de Los Angeles. In 1839 he was elected to a second term and in 1842 he was elected to a third term as Alcade.

From 1833 to 1834, Manuel served as a representative from Los Angeles pueblo to the Mexican Provincial Legislature in Alta California's capital of Monterey. In 1836 he was elected Encargado de Justicia, or Justice of the Peace of the San Pedro District. In 1843, he was appointed by the Governor as the Third Prefect of the Southern District of Alta California, which gave Manuel authority over all of present-day Los Angeles and Orange Counties.

In 1844 he was appointed Capitán de Defensores, local company of militia. In 1848, from September 3 to October 13, during the transition from Mexican to American rule, Dominguez was one of the eight Californio delegates sent to the constitutional convention in Monterey at which a constitution was drafted preparatory to California's admission to the Union as a state. He was a signer of the first constitution of California.

In 1852, Dominguez was elected to the Los Angeles County Board of Supervisors.

== Death ==
Manuel Dominguez died after a short illness on October 11, 1882, at the age of 79. Requiem Mass was celebrated at St. Vibiana's Cathedral in Los Angeles by Bishop Mora. The coffin was attended by twelve prominent men in the community, Californios, Anglos, and Europeans. Dominguez was buried at the old Calvary Cemetery (Los Angeles) which is now abandoned. Some time later he and his wife were re-interred in New Calvary Cemetery.

== Legacy ==
Manuel Dominguez is best remembered for keeping the Rancho San Pedro intact, while most of the other large ranchos were quickly broken up following the end of the Mexican era and the violation of the Treaty of Guadalupe Hidalgo. While diminished in size, the Rancho lands remained in the hands of the Dominguez family via the Dominguez Estate Company, the Dominguez Water Company, and the Watson Land Company. The adobe Manuel built is now both a state and national landmark and is operated as a museum, the Dominguez Rancho Adobe Museum. Manuel Dominguez High School in Compton California was named for him. In 2005, he was inducted into the Hall of Great Westerners of the National Cowboy & Western Heritage Museum.

== See also ==
- Battle of Dominguez Rancho
- Rancho Dominguez, California
- California State University, Dominguez Hills
