= Dominguez Hills (mountain range) =

Mountain range in the Transverse Ranges, in Los Angeles County, California

- Location within California Location within the United States

Highest point
- Elevation: 200 ft (61 m)

Geography
- Country: United States
- State: California
- District: Los Angeles County
- Range coordinates: 33°51′39.060″N 118°14′3.256″W
- Topo map: USGS Long Beach

The Dominguez Hills are a low mountain range in the Transverse Ranges, in southern Los Angeles County, California. They are named for the locally prominent Californio family of Manuel Dominguez, which owned Rancho San Pedro.

They are between the Baldwin Hills and Palos Verdes Peninsula.

== See also ==
- 1910 Los Angeles International Air Meet at Dominguez Field
- California State University, Dominguez Hills
- Dominguez Rancho Adobe
- Battle of Dominguez Rancho
- Rancho Dominguez, California
