= 90502 =

90502 may refer to:

- 90502 Buratti, minor planet
- The ZIP Code for West Carson, California
