= Carson Circuit Transit System =

Transportation system in Carson, California

- Founded: 1984
- Headquarters: 3 Civic Plaza Drive
- Locale: Carson, California, United States
- Service area: Carson
- Service type: Transit bus
- Routes: 2
- Fuel type: CNG, Gasoline
- Website: https://ci.carson.ca.us/communityservices/carson_circuit.aspx

The Carson Circuit Transit System is a primary provider of mass transportation in the city of Carson, Los Angeles County, California. Bus service operated Monday through Saturday. Prior to March 28, 2020, in which service was suspended amid the COVID-19 pandemic, the Carson Circuit provided 7 routes around the City of Carson, with bus connections to Metro, Torrance Transit, Long Beach Transit, and GTrans. There was a North-South Shuttle route that traveled throughout Carson starting and ending at the Harbor Gateway Transit Center. Carson Circuit was operated by MV Public Transportation.

On September 17, 2019, Carson City Council announced plans to allocate the Carson Circuit routes to the Long Beach Transit.

On March 28, 2020, Carson Circuit suspended services due to respect for the ongoing COVID-19 pandemic. However, the Dial-A-Ride was still in service, catering to local residents.

At a July 20, 2021 City Council Meeting, Long Beach Transit proposed three new routes that they will acquire from Carson Circuit. The acquisition is expected to commence as early as September 2021. The shift in bus travel would replace the neighborhood-serving routes of the former Carson Circuit, which historically had low ridership, with longer-distance regional service, connecting several communities along the line.

On September 7, 2021, City Council announced plans to reestablish Carson Circuit "as a staff-operated supplemental bus service utilizing existing minibuses". When this will happen will be discussed at a future City Council meeting.

On December 23, 2021, it was announced that Carson Circuit would be revived with two new routes. Service would resume on January 3, 2022.

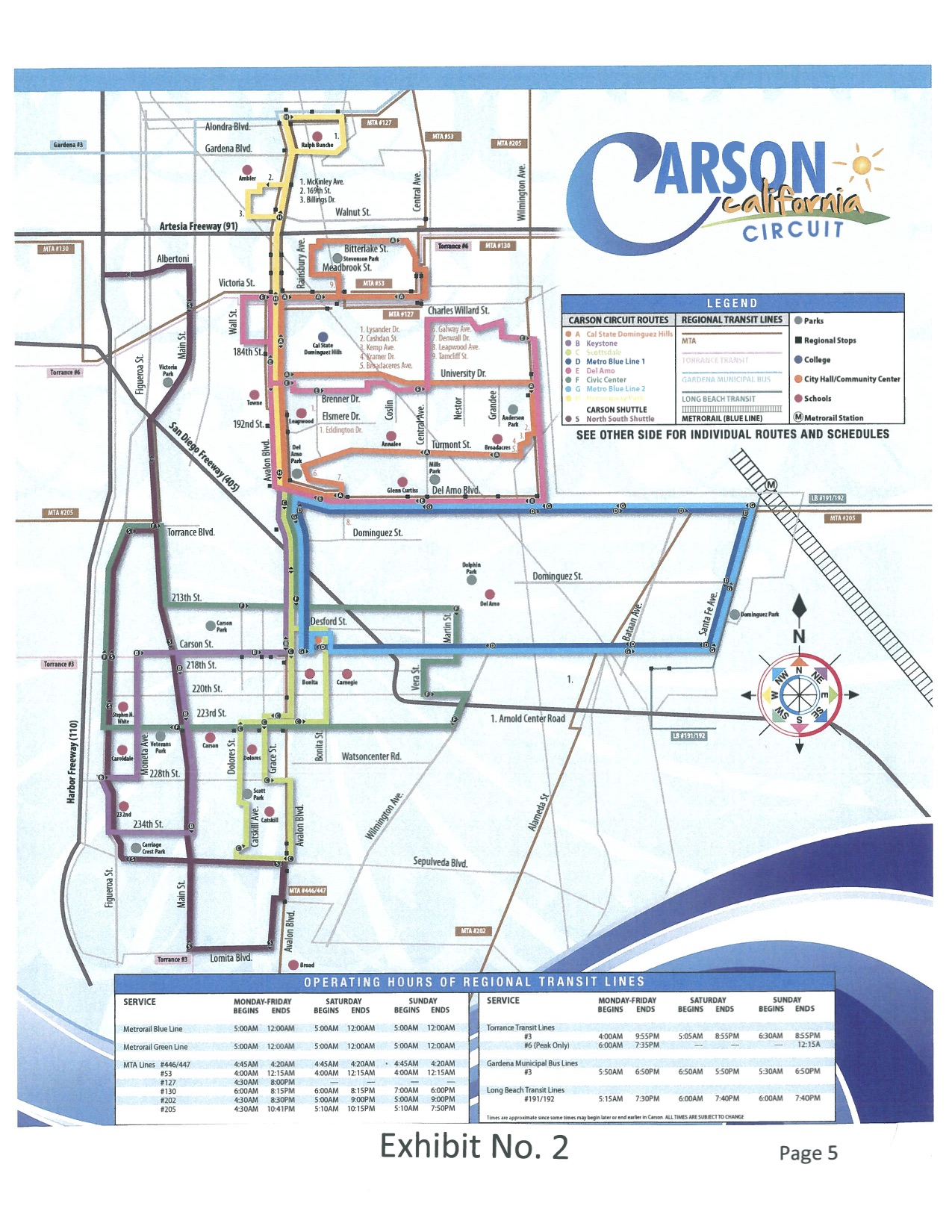
The map of Carson Circuit prior to March 2020.

== Routes ==
Routes	Terminals	Notes
A	South Bay Pavilion	Provides connections to CSUDH - Stevenson Park - and Anderson Park via Avalon Blvd, Victoria St., Central Ave., University Dr., and Turmont St. Neighborhoods Map: https://ci.carson.ca.us/content/files/pdfs/transportation/RouteA%20-%20CarsonCircuit.pdf
B	South Bay Pavilion	Provides connections to City Hall - Carson Park - Carson High School - and Veterans Park via Avalon Blvd., 213th, and Main St in West Central Carson Map: https://ci.carson.ca.us/content/files/pdfs/transportation/RouteB%20-%20CarsonCircuit.pdf

== Fleet ==
Order Year	Manufacturer	Model	Fleet Series (Quantity)	Engine	Transmission	Fuel Propulsion
2008	ElDorado National	Passport CNG	0808, 1217	Cummins Westport ISL G EPA07	GM 4-Speed Automatic	CNG
2016	Freightliner	S2C 35	1507	Cummins ISL9 EPA13	Allison 2500 PTS	Diesel
2013	Starcraft Bus IC	Starcraft Allstar HC300	1553	MaxxForce DT	Allison 2400	Diesel
2017	BlueBird	TX4	801-808	Cummins Westport ISL G NZ	Allison 2500 PTS	CNG
2009	Thomas	Saf-T-Liner HDX	1190	Cummins Westport ISL G EPA07	Allison 2500 PTS	CNG
