= Dominguez Rancho Adobe =

Historic house in California, United States

- Dominguez Ranch Adobe
- U.S. National Register of Historic Places
- California Historical Landmark No. 152
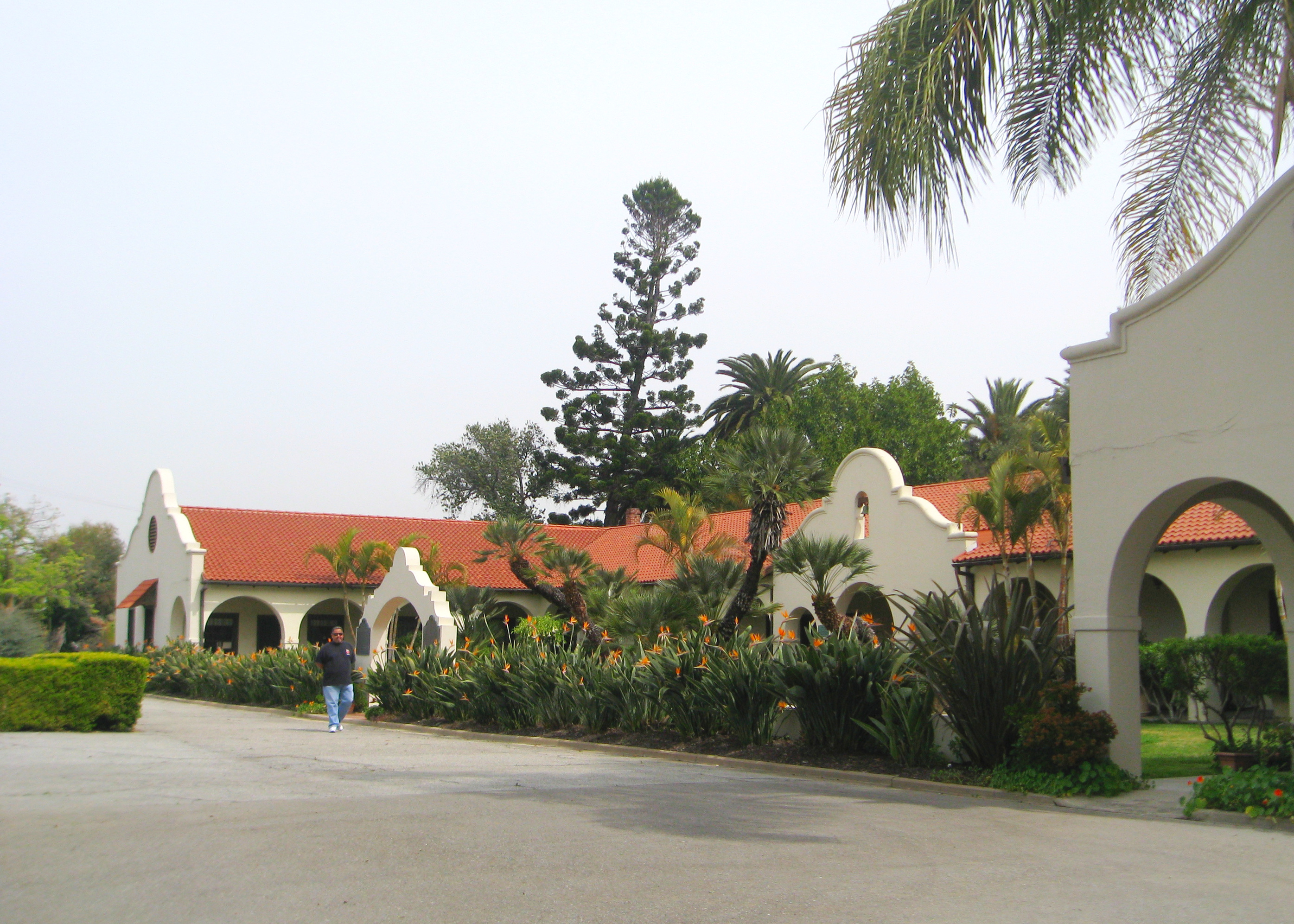

- Location within the Los Angeles metropolitan area Location within California Location within the United States
- Location: 18127 S. Alameda St. Compton, California
- Coordinates: 33°52′1″N 118°13′3″W
- NRHP reference No.: 76000486
- CHISL No.: 152
- Added to NRHP: May 28, 1976

The Dominguez Rancho Adobe is California Historical Landmark Number 152, and in 1976 was placed on the National Register of Historic Places by the United States Department of the Interior.

The adobe of Manuel Dominguez, on the Spanish land grant of Rancho San Pedro (re-validated under Mexican rule), was completed in 1826. The home features 2-foot-thick (0.61 m) walls, heavy timbers and a flat, tarred roof. Much of the furniture is original to the Dominguez family.

The Friends of Rancho San Pedro operate the adobe ranch home as the Dominguez Rancho Adobe Museum. The Friends provide guided tours of the house, as well as host many educational programs about ranch life and early California history. The museum's address is 18127 South Alameda Street, Rancho Dominguez, California, an unincorporated community in Los Angeles County, located between the cities of Compton, Long Beach and Carson.

== History ==
The Rancho San Pedro is the site of the First Spanish land grant in California. The land was usurped from the indigenous inhabitants by Spanish soldiers and missionaries, and in 1784 King Carlos III granted the land to Juan Jose Dominguez, a retired Spanish soldier who came to California with the Portola expedition and later with Father Juniperro Serra. This grant encompassed 75,000 acres and included the entire Los Angeles harbor. The indigenous people, known as the Tongva, were forced into Spanish missions, most likely Mission San Gabriel, where most perished from disease, violence, and forced work. Due to a lack of heirs, the land was then passed to Cristobal Dominguez, a nephew of Juan Jose. Cristobal’s son, Manuel Dominguez, would succeed him in taking control of the land upon his father’s death. It was under Manuel’s guidance that the Rancho as it is seen today was constructed in 1826.

During this time Manuel was also focused on acquiring a United States land patent, which would solidify ownership of the Rancho under United States’ law. The patent was granted and signed by President James Buchanan on December 18, 1858, more than 7 years after it was first requested and nearly 75 years after the original land grant. This was the first U.S. land patent granted in California. However, throughout the years of political turmoil in California, prolonged court battles over ownership of the Rancho, numerous surveys of the land, and the sale of some parcels, the United States land patent stated that the Rancho now encompassed 25,000 acres, far fewer than the 75,000 acres included in the original land grant.

Manuel Dominguez was a business-savvy young man who could speak both Spanish and English as a result of successful trade. He was also the only one of his siblings who could read and write. At the age of 29, he was elected as Mayor of Los Angeles. Manuel later became one of 47 delegates in California to sign the State Constitution. Not long thereafter, President James Buchanan signed the first land patent granted in California to Manuel Dominguez, solidifying the grounds in use by the museum today.

=== Battle of the Old Woman’s Gun ===
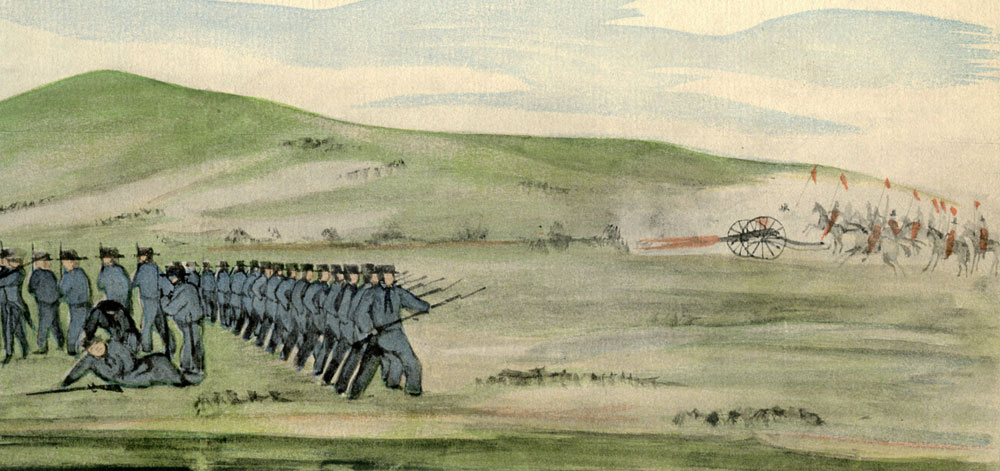
Battle of Dominguez Rancho, 1846

During the Mexican–American War in 1846, the Battle of Dominguez Rancho or Battle of the Old Woman’s Gun occurred on the eastern side of Dominguez Hill, its location being a factor in the temporary defeat of American troops by a band of Spanish Californians. This one-hour altercation took place on October 8 near the home of Manuel Dominguez, with the Rancho buildings being occupied from the previous night by Captain Mervine and his marines.

=== Partition ===
Upon Manuel’s death in 1882, and the passing of his wife one year later, the Rancho lands were partitioned among his six surviving children, all daughters. Three of the married daughters continued the Dominguez legacy through the Carson, Del Amo and Watson families

== Pacific Electric Railway ==
By the time the railroad came into the lives of the Dominguez family, in 1869, the family already had a lucrative cattle business. In fact, the cattle were slaughtered in the fields on the spot. When the railroad was built running through Rancho lands that practice came to a halt. Manuel donated 100 feet, about 77 acres, to the railroad.

In 1902, the Pacific Electric Railway was set to cut through Dominguez and Watson land. In the agreement, the Dominguez family requested there be a Dominguez Junction at Alameda Street. This is where Union Pacific freight trains still run to this day. Teams of men, horses, and mules built the railway at a rapid pace. On July 4, 1902, the railway officially opened. The Pacific Electric Railway would pass by the Dominguez Junction every hour, and thereby increased the value of the rancho lands.

As a passenger train, people were able to frequent the rancho more easily and more often. The Dominguez family became known for their large family barbecues, which were made possible by the advent of the locomotive. However, the trains definitely had their downsides. Raising livestock and agriculture was made more difficult, and people throughout the area complained through Robert Watson to reach the Pacific Electric Railway Company. Ultimately, however, the railroad was beneficial to the Dominguez heritage, as Carson was able to ship over 70,000 pounds of wool at a time The Rancho has a collection of antique large-scale model trains located in their carriage house as well.

== 1910 Air Meet at Dominguez Field ==
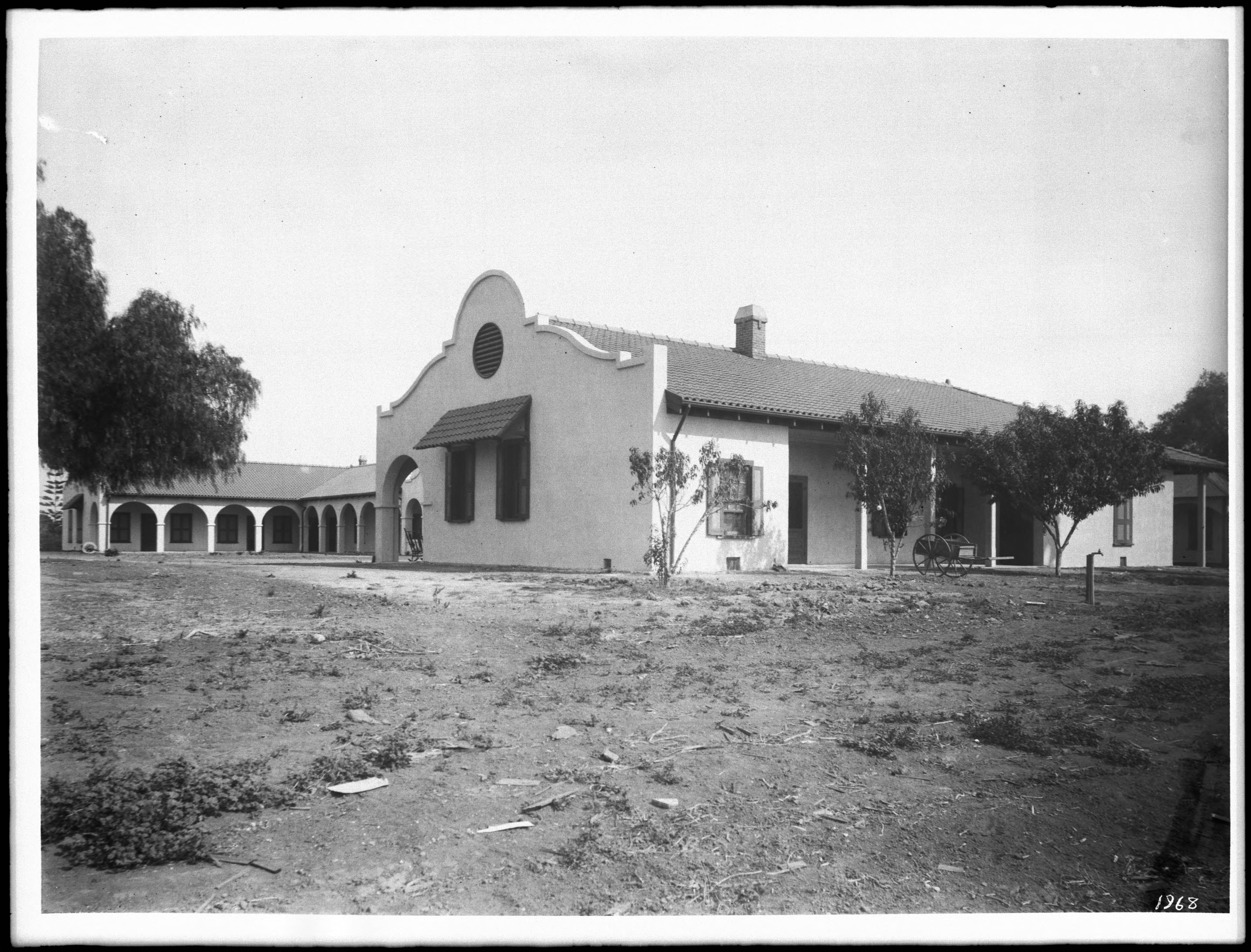
Dominguez Ranch House, ca.1910 (CHS-1968)

In 1910, Dominguez Hill served as the site of the first national aviation meet in the United States. It is estimated that over a half-million passengers traveled by train to see this historic event. An open grandstand was erected that was more than six hundred feet in length. Use of the field was provided without rental charge by the Dominguez family, though the family asked to have front row seats for the entire event. Many of the early aviation pioneers were present, including the Curtiss, Martin, Paulhan, and Willard. Roy Knabenshue flew in one of the first blimps. The aviation meet lasted for 10 days, establishing the first speed and endurance records.

== The Claretians ==
Manuel and his family were also very devout Catholics. All of the daughters made major donations to the construction of St. Vibiana’s, the former Cathedral in downtown Los Angeles. In 1922, the two remaining daughters, Susana Del Amo and Reyes Dominguez, deeded seventeen acres adjacent to the family home to the Claretian Missionaries. In 1924, the Claretian Missionaries began using the adobe home as a graduate school for Claretians and later as a seminary. In recognition of this contribution to the Claretians, special arrangements were made to allow Susana and Gregorio Del Amo to be buried in a crypt beneath the altar of the chapel located in the modern day Claretian retirement home.

== Modern land division ==
In 1967 the stockholders of the Dominguez Estate Company voted to sell off a large portion of the land. The sale was the largest in southern Californian history. The state of California purchased a portion of the land, and in 1965 the Board of Trustees of the California State Colleges voted to build a new campus on the west side of Dominguez Hill, which became California State University Dominguez Hills.

Without the foresight and leadership of Juan Jose, Cristobal and Manuel Dominguez, the Rancho San Pedro may not have survived to the modern day. Many of the Spanish land grants in California were sold to settlers, abandoned, or lost entirely due to costly court battles to defend ownership of the property. Recently, the Dominguez family has been host to the King and Queen of Spain, the Governors of California, and other dignitaries at events held throughout the Rancho lands.

Today, the descendants of the Dominguez family operate the Watson Land Company and the Carson Companies on the original Rancho land. Throughout his life, Manuel resisted selling the land, preferring instead to lease parcels and retain ownership. This strategy was followed by his children, which allowed for a substantial portion of the land grant to be held by family members today. This includes the museum which showcases the adobe home of Manuel Dominguez.

== California Historical Landmark Marker ==
California Historical Landmark Marker NO. 152 at the site reads:

- NO. 152 DOMÍNGUEZ RANCHHOUSE - The central portion of the ranchhouse was built in 1826 by Manuel Domínguez. Rancho San Pedro, ten square leagues granted provisionally by Governor Fages to Juan José Domínguez in 1784, was regranted by Governor Solá to Cristobal Domínguez in 1822. In the battle of Domínguez Ranch, fought here October 8 and 9, 1846, Californians led by José Antonio Carrillo repelled United States forces under Captain William Mervine, U.S. Navy, in an attempt to recapture the Pueblo of Los Angeles.

== See also ==
- Battle of Dominguez Rancho
- Dominguez Hills (mountain range)
- California State University, Dominguez Hills
- Rancho Dominguez, California
- Ranchos of California
