= Harbor City, Los Angeles =

Harbor City
- Neighborhood of Los Angeles
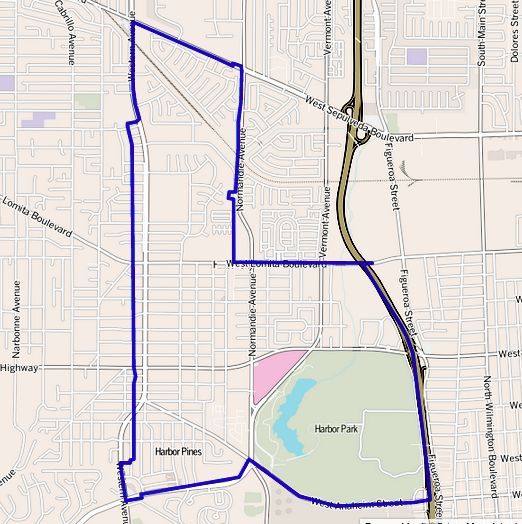
- Harbor City as outlined by the Los Angeles Times

- Location within Southern Los Angeles
- Coordinates: 33.79°N 118.29694°W
- Country: United States
- State: California
- County: Los Angeles
- City: Los Angeles
- Named for: Nearby ports of Los Angeles and Long Beach

Harbor City is a highly diverse neighborhood in the South Bay and Harbor region of Los Angeles, California, with a population upward of 36,000 people. Originally part of the Rancho San Pedro Spanish land grant, the 2.58-square-mile (6.7 km^{2}) Harbor City was brought into Los Angeles as a preliminary step in the larger city's consolidation with the port cities of Wilmington and San Pedro.

The area includes two high schools and seven other schools, as well as the Ken Malloy Harbor Regional and two other parks. There is a Kaiser Permanente hospital as well. Harbor City's percentage of high school graduates is larger than the city's as a whole.

== Geography ==
Harbor City is flanked by Harbor Gateway to the north, West Carson and Wilmington to the east, Wilmington and San Pedro to the south and Torrance and Lomita to the west. The neighborhood's boundaries are West Sepulveda Boulevard on the north, Western Avenue and the Harbor Freeway (following the city line with Los Angeles County) on the east, West Anaheim Street and Palos Verdes Drive on the south and the boundary with Lomita and Torrance on the west

== Population ==
A total of 23,561 people lived in Harbor City's 2.58 square miles, according to the 2000 U.S. census—about 9,127 people per square mile, an average population density compared to the city as a whole. Population was estimated at 36,040 in 2008. The median age was 40, also average for Los Angeles. The percentages of people from birth through age 34 were among the county's highest. The percentage of widowed men (7.3%) was among the county's highest.

Harbor City is considered highly diverse ethnically, with a diversity index of 0.674. In 2000 Latinos made up 48.1% of the population, non-Hispanic whites 25.1%, Asians 14.1%, blacks 10.7% and others 2%. Mexico and Korea were the most common places of birth for the 36.2% of the residents who were born abroad, considered an average percentage of foreign-born when compared with the city and the county as a whole.

The $55,454 median household income in 2008 dollars was average for the city. Renters occupied 54.4% of the housing units, and homeowners occupied the rest.

== History ==
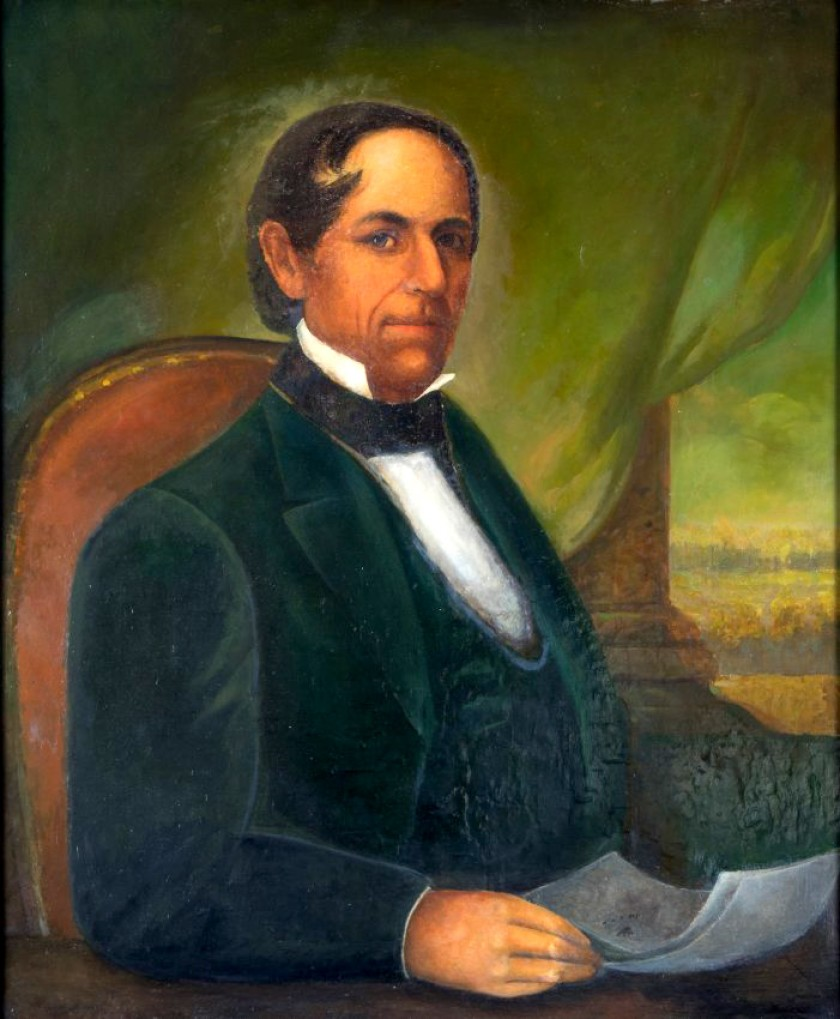
Don Manuel Domínguez, a signer of the Californian Constitution and owner of Rancho San Pedro, which included all of modern-day Harbor City

The Los Angeles Basin was the ancestral land of the Tongva–Gabrieleño Native Americans for thousands of years. In other areas of the Los Angeles Basin, archeological sites date back 8,000 to 15,000 years. Their first contact with Europeans was in 1542 with João Cabrilho (Juan Cabrillo), the Portuguese explorer who also was the first to write of them. Shwaanga, a very large Tongva settlement in the Harbor area, was also a departure point for rancherias on the Channel Islands. The water at Machado Lake was so clean that it used to be called "Sweet Water." The Tongva lived in a virtual paradise for thousands of years, with good weather, an abundance of food and water, and plenty of resources. In 1542, the Spanish arrived in the Catalina (Pimu’nga) and San Pedro (Chaawenga, Palos Verdes-Chowiinga) harbor areas.

Harbor City was originally part of the Rancho San Pedro, granted by the Spanish Empire in 1784 by King Carlos III to Juan Jose Dominguez. The rancho was divided and sold by Californios during the Spanish and Mexican periods of Alta California. After the Mexican–American War ended in 1848, many of the rancho lands were acquired by American settlers.

By around the start of the 20th century, city leaders had decided that it would be in the best interests of Angeles if the port and harbor areas were directly annexed. The independent cities of San Pedro (founded in the late 18th century) and Wilmington (founded in 1858 by Phineas Banning) were then-independent establishments of what would become the Port of Los Angeles. Following the establishment of San Pedro as the main source for the port in Santa Monica in 1897, Los Angeles city leaders argued that direct control over the port areas would be mutually beneficial by providing San Pedro and Wilmington with larger funding and in turn allowing the city to garner more revenue via the increasing port trade. The two cities were initially reluctant to join, but in 1906, frustrated by the indecision of San Pedro and Wilmington leaders, the city of Los Angeles purchased a long and narrow swath of land that connected then-South Los Angeles to San Pedro, naming the two regions Harbor Gateway and Harbor City. City leaders then threatened to build a new port in Harbor City if the recalcitrant towns would not acquiesce to annexation. Both agreed by 1909. In return, the city of Los Angeles elected to keep Harbor City as a land-locked part of the main city, linking the metropolis to its newly-won ocean trading centers.

== Landmarks ==
Harbor City hosts a hospital and various medical buildings in the Kaiser Permanente Medical Center, located along Pacific Coast Highway (SR 1), between Normandie and Vermont Avenues. The hospital is across from Ken Malloy Memorial Park.

== Education ==
18.1% of Harbor City's residents aged 25 or older had completed a four-year degree by 2000, an average figure when compared with the city and the county at large.

=== Schools ===
The schools within Harbor City's boundaries are:

- Nathaniel Narbonne Senior High School, LAUSD, 24300 South Western Avenue
- Harbor Teacher Preparation Academy, LAUSD high school, actually located in the neighboring city of Wilmington at 1111 Figueroa Place
- George S. Patton Continuation School, LAUSD, 24514 South Western Avenue
- President Avenue Elementary School, LAUSD, 1465 West 243rd Street
- The Pines Christian, private elementary school, 25200 South Western Avenue
- Normont Elementary School, 1001 West 253rd Street
- Harbor Church Schools, private elementary, 1716 West 254th Street
- Harbor City Elementary School, LAUSD, 1508 West 254th Street
- Gateway Christian School, private, 25500 Vermont Avenue
- Los Angeles Harbor College, public community college, located in the neighboring city of Wilmington at 1111 Figueroa Place

In the 1990s, Coast Christian Schools (now Valor Christian Academy) had a campus in Harbor City.

=== Libraries ===
Los Angeles Public Library operates the Harbor Gateway-Harbor City Branch Library.

== Recreation and parks ==
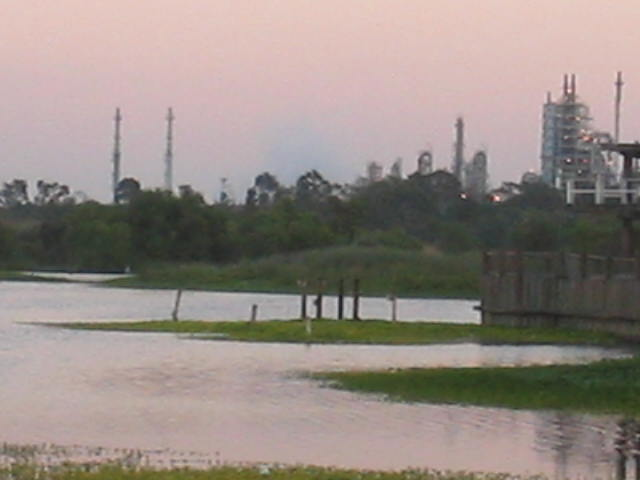
Lake Machado, in Kenneth Malloy Memorial Park

- Harbor City Park, 24902 Frampton Avenue, at Lomita Boulevard, includes the Harbor City Recreation Center and the Harbor City Childcare Center are on the same site.
- The Harbor City Recreation Center, which functions as a Los Angeles Police Department stop-in center, has a gymnasium that may also be used as an auditorium. The center has a lighted baseball diamond, lighted indoor basketball courts, lighted outdoor basketball courts, a children's play area, a community room, picnic tables, a senior center, and a lighted soccer field.
- The Ken Malloy Harbor Regional Park on South Normandie Avenue has barbecue pits, a lighted baseball diamond, a bicycle path, the Machado Youth Camp campground, a children's play area, hiking trails, a jogging path, a lake without fishing and a lighted soccer field.

== Notable residents ==
- Nnamdi Asomugha (born 1981), actor, director, producer, and former professional football player
- Jon Bunch (born 1970), singer and songwriter for the band Sense field
- Bo Derek (born 1956), attended Narbonne High and George S. Patton Continuation School
- Daniel Munyer (born 1992), NFL football player
- Merrill Moses (born 1977), Olympic water polo player
- Jon Singleton (born 1991), Major League Baseball player
- Stephen Thompson Jr. (born 1997), basketball player in the Israeli Basketball Premier League
- Jennifer Tilly (born 1958), actress and poker player
- Brian Welch (born 1970), musician and guitarist for the band Korn

== See also ==
- Reggie (alligator), for the alligator found in Ken Malloy Regional Park.,
- List of districts and neighborhoods in Los Angeles
