= William Mervine =

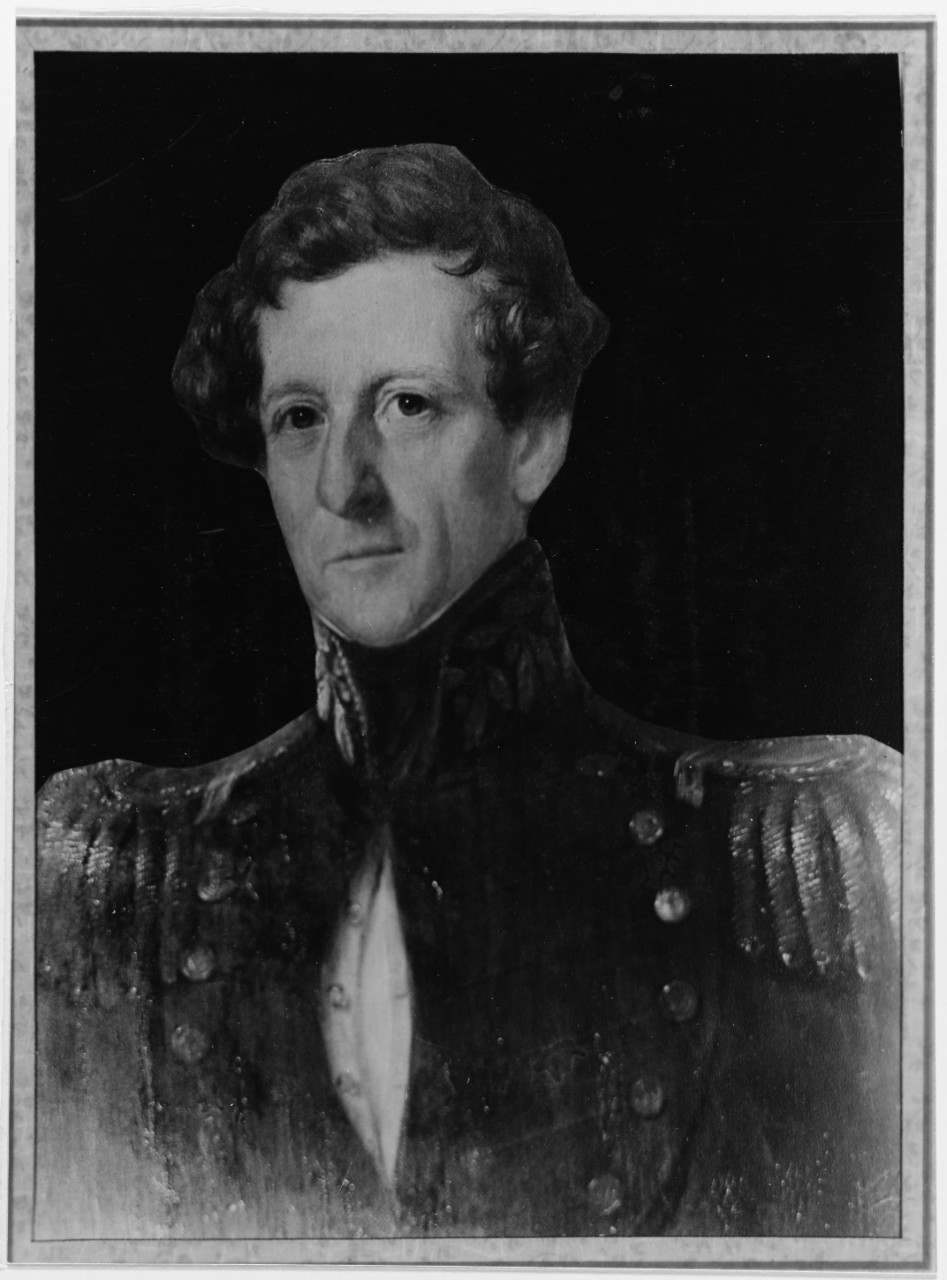
- Captain William Mervine in 1847
- Born: 14 March 1791; Philadelphia, Pennsylvania, U.S.
- Died: 15 September 1868 (aged 77); Utica, New York, U.S.
- Military career
- Allegiance: United States of America
- Branch: United States Navy
- Service years: 1809–1861
- Rank: Rear admiral
- Commands: USS Savannah; Gulf Blockading Squadron
- Conflicts: War of 1812; Mexican–American War; American Civil War

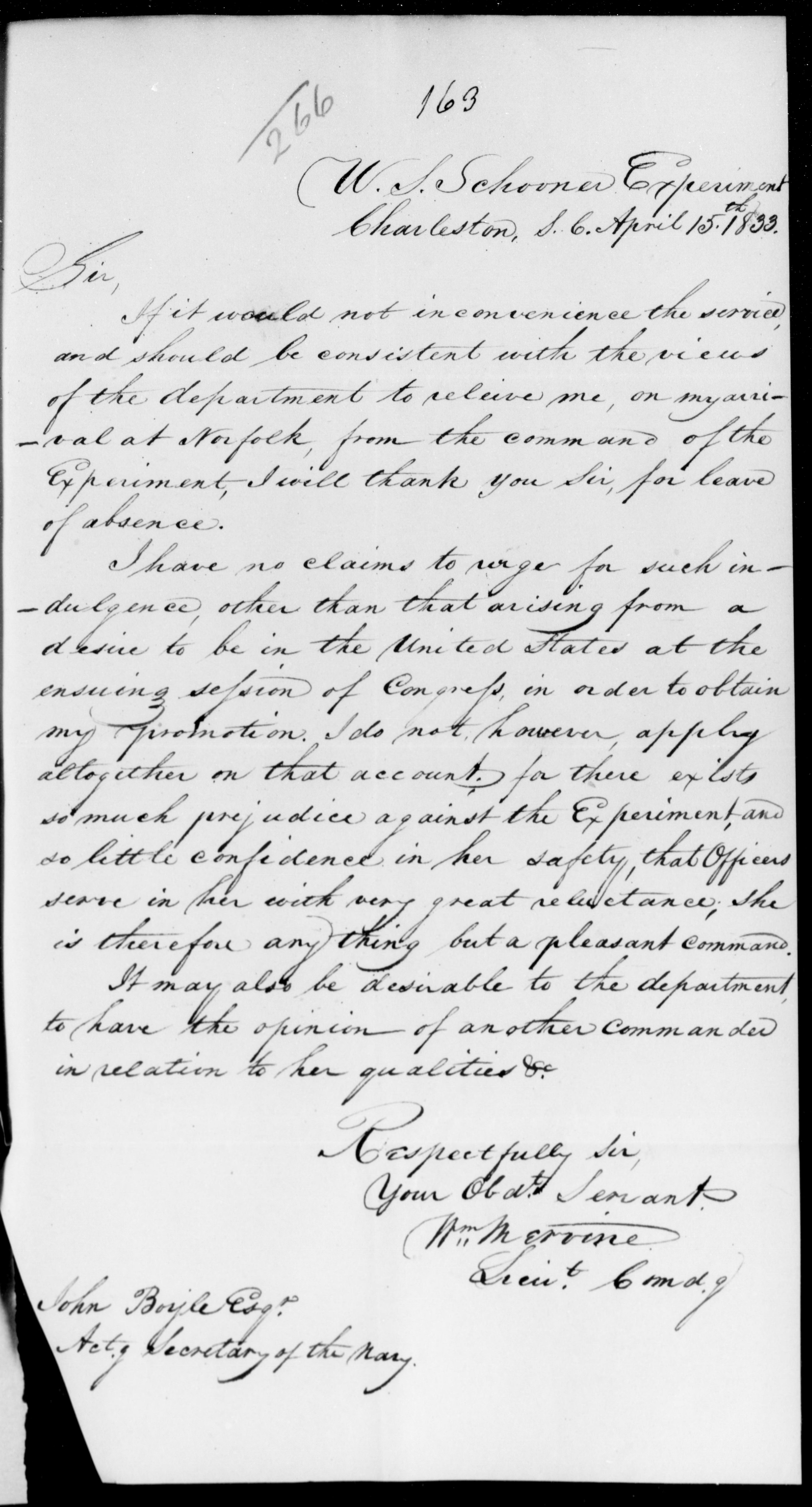
1833 letter from William Mervine

William Mervine (14 March 1791 – 15 September 1868) was a rear admiral in the United States Navy, whose career included service in the War of 1812, the Mexican–American War and the American Civil War.

== Early life and career ==
Born in Philadelphia, Pennsylvania, Mervine was appointed midshipman in January 1809. Serving on Lake Ontario during the War of 1812, he later cruised off Africa and South America, in the West Indies and in the Pacific.

While in command of the Savannah during the war with Mexico, 1846 and 1847, he led a detachment of sailors and United States Marines against Monterey, California, and on 7 July 1846, took possession and hoisted the American flag over the city. On 7–9 October 1846, Mervine led 203 U.S. Marines, 147 American sailors, and volunteers in the invasion of Los Angeles where he lost the Battle of Dominguez Rancho. Fourteen Marines were killed. José Antonio Carrillo, a Californio rancher, led 50 Spanish Californio lancers in that defeat of Mervine and the American forces.

== US Civil War Service ==
On 7 May 1861, Secretary of the Navy Gideon Welles appointed the 70-year-old Captain Mervine to command the Gulf Blockading Squadron within the Gulf of Mexico. The assignment was difficult and arduous. Ship Island, MS was deemed to be "indispensable" and must be taken to control the maritime traffic. However on 22 September 1861, he was removed as commander of the blockade force by Secretary of the Navy Gideon Welles. He stated he found it "difficult to understand the reasons for the apparent inactivity and indifference that have governed in this matter. You have large ships, heavy batteries, and young and willing officers, with men sufficient to dispossess the insurgents from Ship Island." Captain Mervine's removal was seconded by the fact that he had been suffering from illness. He was reassigned and worked until late 1865.

He died at Utica, New York on 15 September 1868 at the age of 77 years. He is buried at the Forest Hill Cemetery located in Utica.

== US Navy ships ==
The Navy has named two destroyers USS Mervine in his honor.

- USS Mervine (DD-322) was a Clemson-class destroyer in service with the US Navy from 1921 to 1930. She was scrapped in 1931.
- USS Mervine (DD-489) was a Greaves-class destroyer in service with the US Navy from 1942 to 1949. She remained in reserve until 1969 she was sold for scrapping.
