= Rancho Dominguez Preparatory School =

Location
- 4110 Santa Fe Ave, Long Beach, CA 90810, USA; 33.83397800000001°N 118.21574950000002°W

Information
- Type: Public
- Established: 2011
- School district: Los Angeles Unified School District
- Staff: 39.33 (FTE)
- Grades: 6-12
- Enrollment: 813 (2018-19)
- Student to teacher ratio: 21.21
- Color
- Team name: Lobos
- Website: Official Website

Rancho Dominguez Preparatory School (RDPS) is a public middle and high school in Long Beach, California in the Los Angeles metropolitan area, California, United States. It is a part of the Los Angeles Unified School District. It was previously named South Region High School #4.

As of 2012 most of the students reside in the Wilmington area of Los Angeles and the City of Carson.

== History ==
It opened in 2011, relieving Banning High School, Carson High School, Carnegie Middle School, and Curtiss Middle School.

== Curriculum and student culture ==
They also have several AP courses, extracurriculars, and a high school news publication.
