= West Carson, California =

- unincorporated community
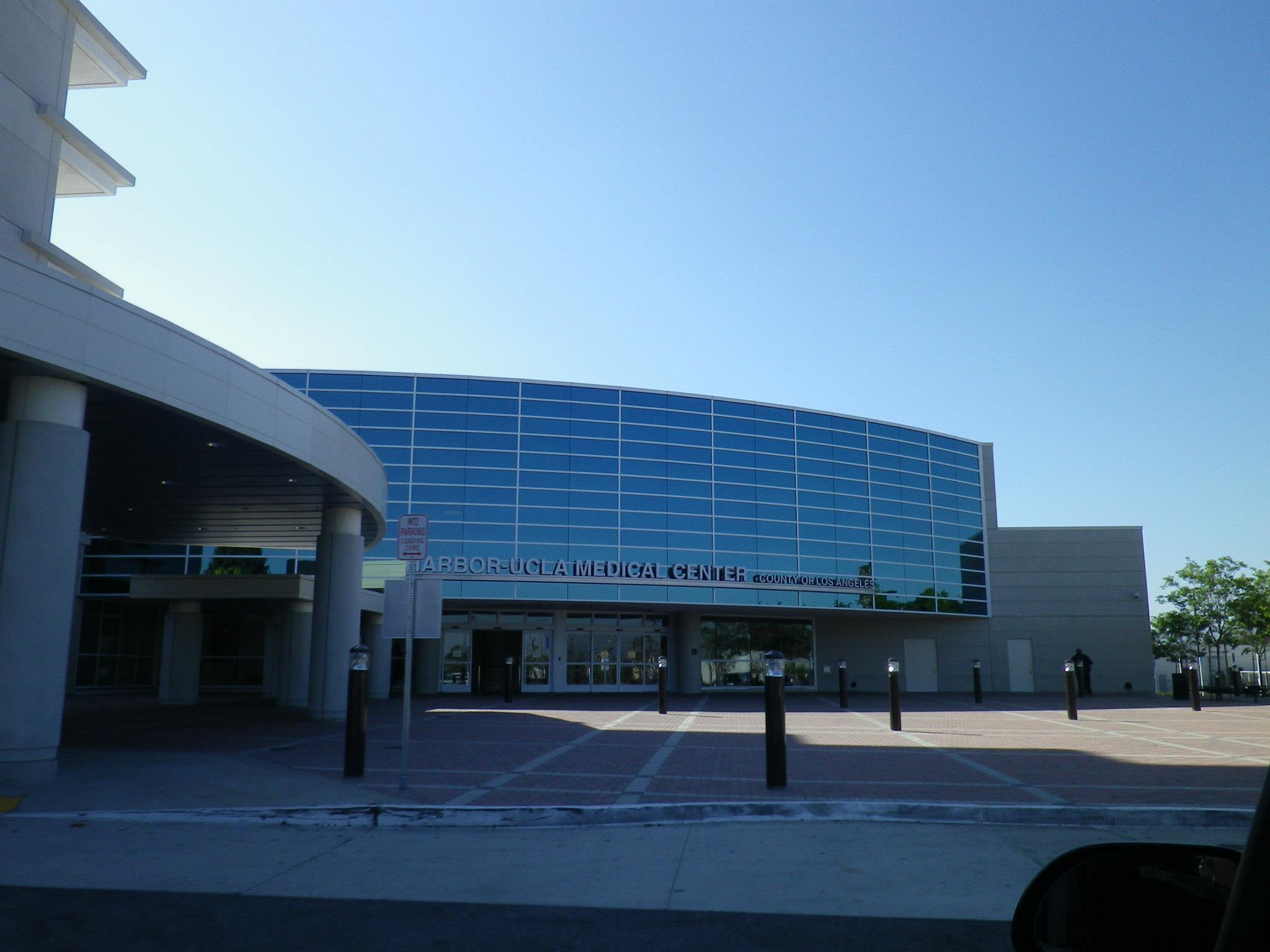
- Harbor–UCLA Medical Center
- Interactive map of West Carson, California
- Location in the United States
- Coordinates: 33°49′35″N 118°17′33″W
- Country: United States
- State: California
- County: Los Angeles

Area
  - Total: 2.279 sq mi (5.902 km^{2})
  - Land: 2.266 sq mi (5.869 km^{2})
  - Water: 0.013 sq mi (0.033 km^{2}) 0.56%
- Elevation: 43 ft (13 m)

Population (2020)
  - Total: 22,870
  - Density: 10,090/sq mi (3,897/km^{2})
- Time zone: UTC-8 (PST)
  - Summer (DST): UTC-7 (PDT)
- ZIP code: 90502; 90710 (Harbor City P.O.)
- FIPS code: 06-84144
- GNIS feature ID: 1867069

West Carson is an unincorporated community in the South Bay region of Los Angeles County, California, United States. The population was 22,870 at the 2020 census. For statistical purposes, the United States Census Bureau has defined West Carson as a census-designated place (CDP).

== Geography ==
The area is bounded on the east by the city of Carson along the Harbor Freeway (Interstate 110). The area is bounded on the other three sides by the city of Los Angeles. Del Amo Boulevard is the north boundary with the neighborhood of Harbor Gateway. Lomita Boulevard is the south boundary with the neighborhood of Harbor City. The west boundary along Normandie Avenue is shared by both Los Angeles neighborhoods.

The ZIP code encompassing most of the area is 90502 which the United States Postal Service designates as a Torrance mailing address after the city that lies to the west over the Los Angeles strip. The southern portion shares the 90710 ZIP Code with the Harbor City neighborhood.

According to the United States Census Bureau, the CDP has a total area of 2.3 square miles (6.0 km^{2}), over 99% of it land.

== Demographics ==
Historical population
Census	Pop.	Note	%±
1970	15,918		—
1980	17,997		13.1%
1990	20,143		11.9%
2000	21,138		4.9%
2010	21,699		2.7%
2020	22,870		5.4%
U.S. Decennial Census; 1860–1870 1880-1890; 1900 1910 1920; 1930 1940 1950; 1960 1970 1980; 1990 2000 2010; 2020

West Carson first appeared as an unincorporated place in the 1970 U.S. census as part of the Compton census county division; and as a census designated place in the 1980 United States census.

=== Racial and ethnic composition ===
West Carson CDP, California – Racial and ethnic composition Note: the US Census treats Hispanic/Latino as an ethnic category. This table excludes Latinos from the racial categories and assigns them to a separate category. Hispanics/Latinos may be of any race.
Race / Ethnicity (NH = Non-Hispanic)	Pop 2000	Pop 2010	Pop 2020	% 2000	% 2010	% 2020
White alone (NH)	6,193	4,637	3,761	29.30%	21.37%	16.45%
Black or African American alone (NH)	2,439	2,263	2,176	11.54%	10.43%	9.51%
Native American or Alaska Native alone (NH)	75	79	63	0.35%	0.36%	0.28%
Asian alone (NH)	5,253	6,629	7,886	24.85%	30.55%	34.48%
Native Hawaiian or Pacific Islander alone (NH)	238	288	253	1.13%	1.33%	1.11%
Other race alone (NH)	46	89	124	0.22%	0.41%	0.54%
Mixed race or Multiracial (NH)	671	614	824	3.17%	2.83%	3.60%
Hispanic or Latino (any race)	6,223	7,100	7,783	29.44%	32.72%	34.03%
Total	21,138	21,699	22,870	100.00%	100.00%	100.00%

=== 2020 census ===
As of the 2020 census, West Carson had a population of 22,870 and a population density of 10,092.7 inhabitants per square mile (3,896.8/km^{2}). The census reported that 95.4% of residents lived in households, 0.5% lived in non-institutionalized group quarters, and 4.1% were institutionalized. 100.0% of residents lived in urban areas, while 0.0% lived in rural areas.

The median age was 45.7 years; 15.4% of residents were under the age of 18 and 22.0% were 65 years of age or older. For every 100 females there were 94.8 males, and for every 100 females age 18 and over there were 92.1 males age 18 and over.

There were 7,873 households, of which 25.4% had children under the age of 18 living in them. Of all households, 47.7% were married-couple households, 18.1% were households with a male householder and no spouse or partner present, and 28.7% were households with a female householder and no spouse or partner present. About 22.7% of all households were made up of individuals and 10.0% had someone living alone who was 65 years of age or older. The average household size was 2.77. There were 5,615 families (71.3% of all households).

There were 8,139 housing units at an average density of 3,591.8 per square mile (1,386.8/km^{2}); 7,873 (96.7%) were occupied. Of the occupied units, 69.4% were owner-occupied and 30.6% were occupied by renters. The homeowner vacancy rate was 0.5% and the rental vacancy rate was 4.3%.

Racial composition as of the 2020 census
Race	Number	Percent
White	4,850	21.2%
Black or African American	2,269	9.9%
American Indian and Alaska Native	230	1.0%
Asian	8,000	35.0%
Native Hawaiian and Other Pacific Islander	267	1.2%
Some other race	4,354	19.0%
Two or more races	2,900	12.7%
Hispanic or Latino (of any race)	7,783	34.0%

=== 2010 census ===
At the 2010 census West Carson had a population of 21,699. The population density was 9,522.0 inhabitants per square mile (3,676.5/km^{2}). The racial makeup of West Carson was 7,630 (35.2%) White (21.4% Non-Hispanic White), 2,330 (10.7%) African American, 185 (0.9%) Native American, 6,730 (31.0%) Asian, 301 (1.4%) Pacific Islander, 3,411 (15.7%) from other races, and 1,112 (5.1%) from two or more races. Hispanic or Latino of any race were 7,100 persons (32.7%).

The census reported that 20,493 people (94.4% of the population) lived in households, 176 (0.8%) lived in non-institutionalized group quarters, and 1,030 (4.7%) were institutionalized.

There were 7,166 households, 2,236 (31.2%) had children under the age of 18 living in them, 3,634 (50.7%) were opposite-sex married couples living together, 978 (13.6%) had a female householder with no husband present, 450 (6.3%) had a male householder with no wife present. There were 311 (4.3%) unmarried opposite-sex partnerships, and 46 (0.6%) same-sex married couples or partnerships. 1,687 households (23.5%) were one person and 712 (9.9%) had someone living alone who was 65 or older. The average household size was 2.86. There were 5,062 families (70.6% of households); the average family size was 3.40.

The age distribution was 4,066 people (18.7%) under the age of 18, 1,816 people (8.4%) aged 18 to 24, 5,805 people (26.8%) aged 25 to 44, 6,109 people (28.2%) aged 45 to 64, and 3,903 people (18.0%) who were 65 or older. The median age was 42.1 years. For every 100 females, there were 94.9 males. For every 100 females age 18 and over, there were 91.8 males.

There were 7,426 housing units at an average density of 3,258.7 per square mile, of the occupied units 5,459 (76.2%) were owner-occupied and 1,707 (23.8%) were rented. The homeowner vacancy rate was 1.6%; the rental vacancy rate was 4.3%. 15,074 people (69.5% of the population) lived in owner-occupied housing units and 5,419 people (25.0%) lived in rental housing units.

According to the 2010 United States Census, West Carson had a median household income of $62,100, with 8.6% of the population living below the federal poverty line.

=== 2023 American Community Survey ===
In 2023, the US Census Bureau estimated that the median household income was $95,385, and the per capita income was $42,723. About 4.4% of families and 6.8% of the population were below the poverty line.

=== Mapping L.A. ===
Mapping L.A. reported that at the 2000 census, Mexican (22.3%) and Filipino (7.6%) were the most common ancestries. Mexico (28.4%) and the Philippines (24.5%) were the most common foreign places of birth.

== Education ==
Residents are zoned to the Los Angeles Unified School District. Meyler Street Elementary School and Van Deene Elementary School are in West Carson.

== Government and infrastructure ==
The Harbor–UCLA Medical Center, operated by the Los Angeles County Department of Health Services, has a Torrance postal address, but it is located in West Carson.

=== Politics ===
In the state legislature West Carson is located in the 35th Senate District, represented by Democrat Laura Richardson, and in the 65th Assembly District, represented by Democrat Mike Gipson. Federally, West Carson is located in California's California's 44th congressional district and is represented by Democrat Nanette Barragán
