= East Rancho Dominguez, California =

Unincorporated community in California, United States

- Unincorporated community Census designated place
- Interactive map of East Rancho Dominguez, California
- Location in California Location in the United States
- Coordinates: 33°53′52″N 118°11′39″W
- Country: United States
- State: California
- County: Los Angeles

Area
  - Total: 0.821 sq mi (2.127 km^{2})
  - Land: 0.821 sq mi (2.127 km^{2})
  - Water: 0 sq mi (0 km^{2}) 0%
- Elevation: 72 ft (22 m)

Population (2020)
  - Total: 15,114
  - Density: 18,400/sq mi (7,106/km^{2})
- Time zone: UTC−8 (PST)
  - Summer (DST): UTC−7 (PDT)
- ZIP Code: 90221
- Area code: 310/424
- FIPS code: 06-20550
- GNIS feature ID: 1867014

East Rancho Dominguez, also known as East Compton, is an unincorporated community and census-designated place (CDP) located in southern Los Angeles County, California, United States. The population was 15,114 at the 2020 census, down from 15,135 at the 2010 census. East Rancho Dominguez is an accepted city name according to the United States Postal Service, and shares the 90221 ZIP Code with Compton.

East Rancho Dominguez is an unincorporated enclave surrounded by Compton within five blocks east and west of Atlantic Ave. Alondra Boulevard is the southern border, and three blocks north of Rosecrans Ave. is roughly the northern border. East Rancho Dominguez County Park is in the center of the community.

To the north is the city of Lynwood. To the east is the Long Beach Freeway, the Los Angeles River, and then the city of Paramount. To the south and southeast is the city of Long Beach.

Its sphere of influence is the city of Compton, which has tried to annex East Rancho Dominguez, but business and property owners in the area have opposed the annexation. Rancho Dominguez is a separate unincorporated, mostly industrial area south of the city of Compton.

== Geography ==
East Compton is located at 33°53′52″N 118°11′39″W (33.897748, -118.194093).

According to the United States Census Bureau, the CDP has a total area of 0.8 square miles (2.1 km^{2}), all land.

== Demographics ==
Historical population
Census	Pop.	Note	%±
1970	5,853		—
1980	6,435		9.9%
1990	7,967		23.8%
2000	9,286		16.6%
2010	15,135		63.0%
2020	15,114		−0.1%
U.S. Decennial Census; 1860–1870 1880-1890; 1900 1910 1920; 1930 1940 1950; 1960 1970 1980; 1990 2000 2010; 2020

East Rancho Dominguez first appeared as an unincorporated community in the 1970 U.S. census under the name East Compton; and then as a census designated place in the 1980 United States census. The name was changed to East Rancho Dominguez for the 2010 U.S. census.

=== Racial and ethnic composition ===
East Rancho Dominguez CDP, California – Racial and ethnic composition Note: the US Census treats Hispanic/Latino as an ethnic category. This table excludes Latinos from the racial categories and assigns them to a separate category. Hispanics/Latinos may be of any race.
Race / Ethnicity (NH = Non-Hispanic)	Pop 2000	Pop 2010	Pop 2020	% 2000	% 2010	% 2020
White alone (NH)	161	174	143	1.73%	1.15%	0.95%
Black or African American alone (NH)	1,791	2,320	1,841	19.29%	15.33%	12.18%
Native American or Alaska Native alone (NH)	5	11	14	0.05%	0.07%	0.09%
Asian alone (NH)	7	19	32	0.08%	0.13%	0.21%
Native Hawaiian or Pacific Islander alone (NH)	96	105	69	1.03%	0.69%	0.46%
Other race alone (NH)	9	21	58	0.10%	0.14%	0.38%
Mixed race or Multiracial (NH)	53	78	100	0.57%	0.52%	0.66%
Hispanic or Latino (any race)	7,164	12,407	12,857	77.15%	81.98%	85.07%
Total	9,286	15,135	15,114	100.00%	100.00%	100.00%

=== 2020 census ===
As of the 2020 census, East Rancho Dominguez had a population of 15,114. The population density was 18,409.3 inhabitants per square mile (7,107.9/km^{2}). 100.0% of residents lived in urban areas, while 0.0% lived in rural areas.

The age distribution was 28.2% under the age of 18, 11.6% aged 18 to 24, 28.8% aged 25 to 44, 22.6% aged 45 to 64, and 8.8% who were 65 years of age or older. The median age was 31.0 years. For every 100 females, there were 97.5 males, and for every 100 females age 18 and over, there were 96.3 males age 18 and over.

The census reported that 99.4% of the population lived in households, 0.6% lived in non-institutionalized group quarters, and no one was institutionalized. There were 3,344 households, of which 54.0% had children under the age of 18. Of all households, 46.0% were married-couple households, 9.4% were cohabiting couple households, 29.6% had a female householder with no spouse or partner present, and 14.9% had a male householder with no spouse or partner present. About 11.7% of households were made up of individuals, and 4.8% had someone living alone who was 65 years of age or older. The average household size was 4.49. There were 2,789 families (83.4% of all households).

There were 3,409 housing units at an average density of 4,152.3 units per square mile (1,603.2 units/km^{2}), of which 3,344 (98.1%) were occupied. The vacancy rate was 1.9%; the homeowner vacancy rate was 0.1% and the rental vacancy rate was 1.6%. Of occupied units, 54.0% were owner-occupied and 46.0% were renter-occupied.

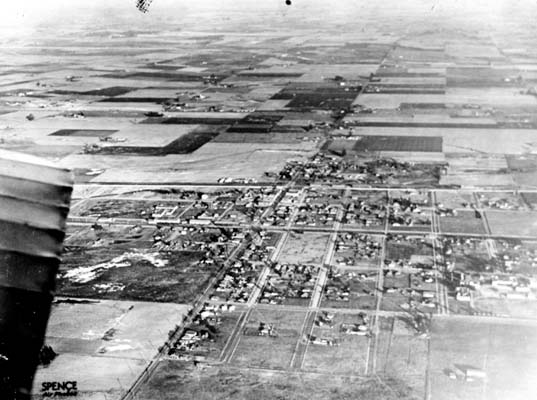
Aerial view of Compton, 1920.

=== Income and poverty ===
In 2023, the US Census Bureau estimated that the median household income was $67,645, and the per capita income was $22,901. About 16.7% of families and 17.7% of the population were below the poverty line.

== Government ==
In the California State Legislature, East Rancho Dominguez is in the 35th senatorial district, represented by Democrat Laura Richardson, and in the 65th Assembly district, represented by Democrat Mike Gipson.

In the United States House of Representatives, East Rancho Dominguez is in California's 43rd congressional district, represented by Democrat Maxine Waters.

== Schools ==
- El Camino College Compton Center
- Compton Unified School District is the school district that covers this CDP

== Parks and recreation ==
East Rancho Dominguez Park was completely renovated in 2004.
