= Rancho San Pedro =

Spanish land grant in California

Coordinates: 33.770°N 118.320°W

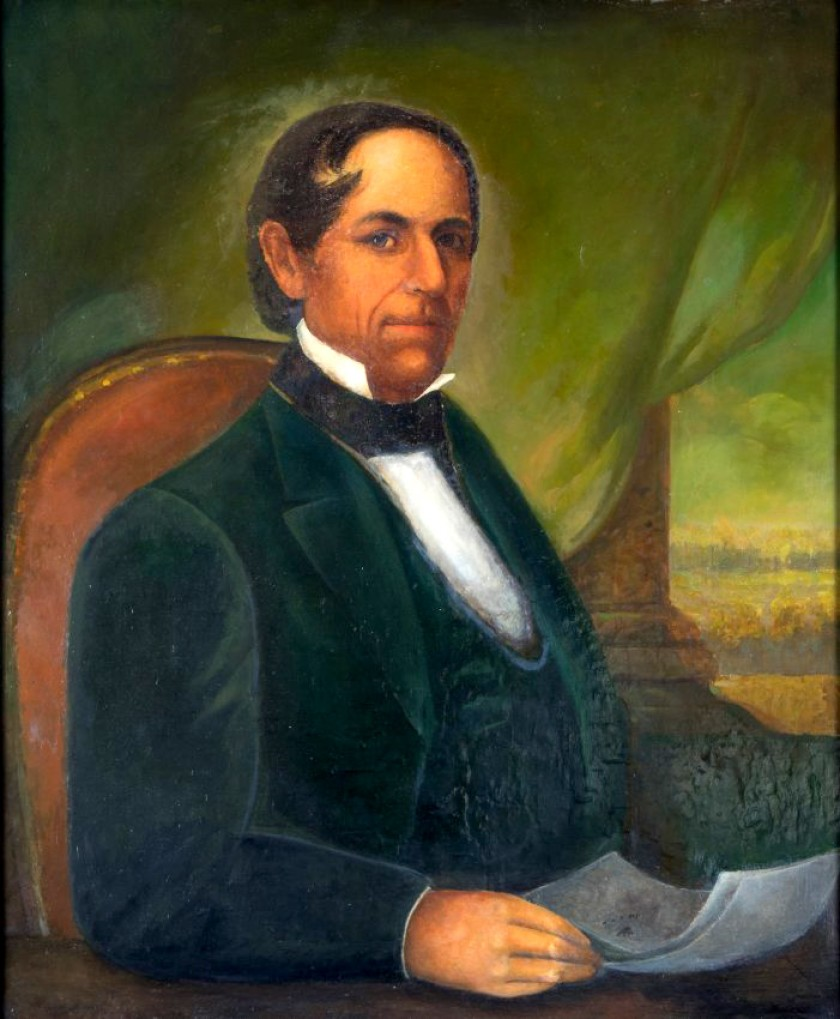
Don Manuel Domínguez, a signer of the California Constitution and owner of Rancho San Pedro

Rancho San Pedro was one of the first California land grants and the first to win a patent from the United States. The Spanish Crown granted the 75,000 acres (300 km^{2}) of land to soldier Juan José Domínguez in 1784, with his descendants validating their legal claim with the Mexican government at 48,000 acres (190 km^{2}) in 1828, and later maintaining their legal claim through a United States patent validating 43,119 acres (174.50 km^{2}) in 1858. The original Spanish land grant included what today consists of the Palos Verdes peninsula with the Pacific coast cities of San Pedro, Torrance, Redondo Beach, Hermosa Beach, and Manhattan Beach, and east to the Los Angeles River, including the cities of Lomita, Gardena, Harbor City, Wilmington, Carson, Compton, and western portions of Long Beach and Paramount.

== History ==
Juan José Domínguez (1736–1809), a Spanish soldier, arrived in San Diego, California, in 1769 with Fernando Rivera y Moncada and served with the Gaspar de Portolà expedition and, along with Fr. Junípero Serra, traveled to San Juan Capistrano, San Gabriel, and Monterey. In 1784, Dominguez was granted a concession of seventeen Spanish leagues, or 75,000 acres (300 km^{2}), from the Spanish Empire.

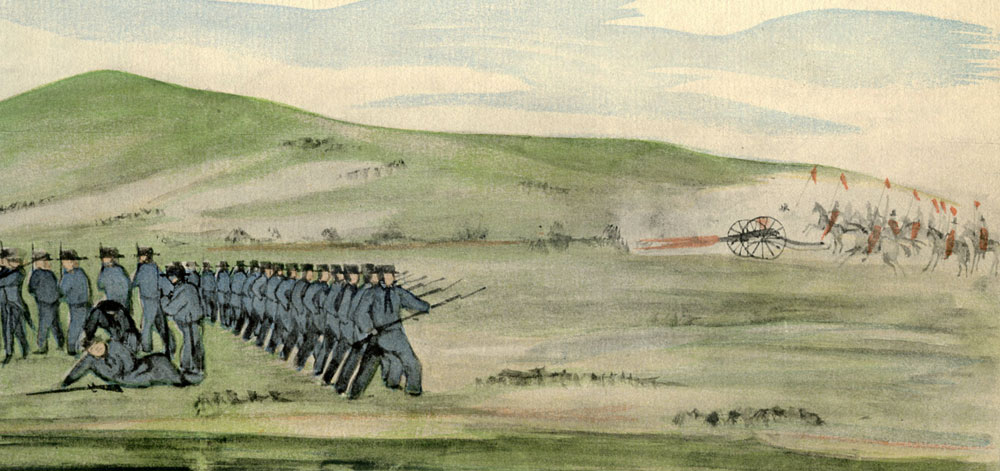
Battle of Dominguez Rancho, 1846

Domínguez's original grazing permission stretched from present-day Compton to the Palos Verdes Peninsula but did not become a title to land until it was "re-granted" in 1822 in the Mexican era to Juan José's nephew and heir, Cristóbal Domínguez. Cristóbal died soon afterward, but his three sons settled on the ranch, building adobe homes. The following year Manuel Domínguez, eldest son of Cristóbal Domínguez, married María Engracia de Cota and commenced a successful career raising cattle and serving in a variety of elected and appointed offices in Los Angeles.

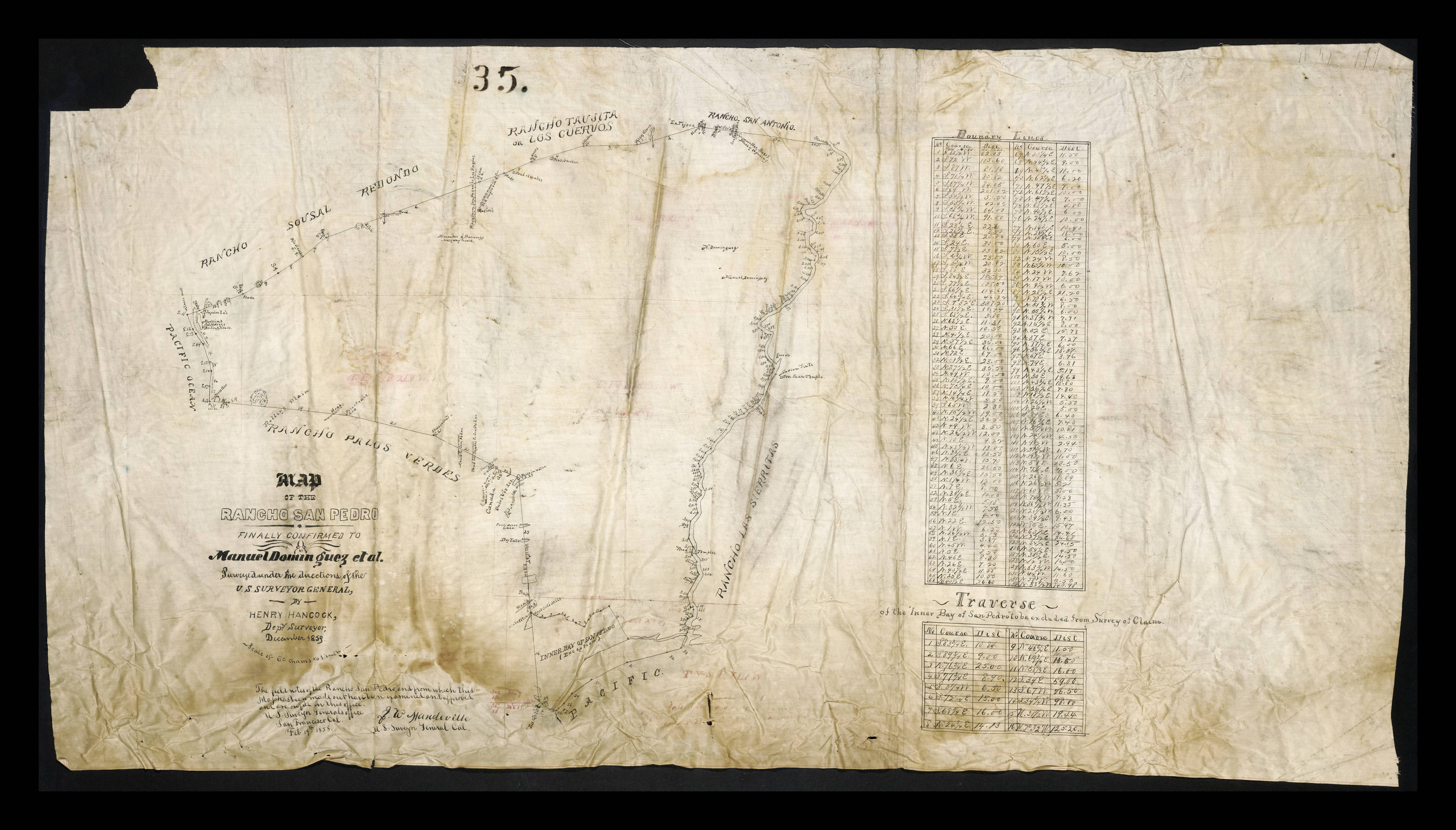
1859 survey map of the Rancho San Pedro as awarded to Manuel Dominguez

For many years, a portion of the Rancho San Pedro land grant was contested between the Domínguez and Sepúlveda families through various appeals to Spanish Governors and lawsuits from 1817–1883 and was eventually partitioned into seventeen parcels in 1882. The Sepúlveda family was awarded 31,629 acres (128 km^{2}) known as Rancho de los Palos Verdes that later became the cities of the Palos Verdes Peninsula, as well as portions of Torrance and San Pedro.

With the cession of California to the United States following the Mexican–American War, the 1848 Treaty of Guadalupe Hidalgo provided that the land grants would be honored. As required by the Land Act of 1851, a claim for Rancho San Pedro was filed with the Public Land Commission in 1852, and a patent for 43,119 acres (170 km^{2}) was granted to Manuel Domínguez and signed by President James Buchanan on December 18, 1858. A separate claim was filed by Nasario Domínguez in 1852 for 1/6 of the grant but it was rejected by the Commission in 1855.

In 1869, Union Army Major General William Starke Rosecrans bought 16,000 acres (65 km^{2}). The "Rosecrans Rancho" was bordered by what later was Florence Avenue on the north, Redondo Beach Boulevard on the south, Central Avenue on the east, and Arlington Avenue on the west.

After the death of Manuel Domínguez and his wife, the rancho was divided among their six surviving daughters. Three of the married daughters continued the Dominguez legacy through the Carson, Del Amo and Watson families.

In 1967, the stockholders of the Dominguez Estate Company voted to sell off a large portion of the land. The sale was the largest in southern Californian history. The state of California purchased a portion of the land, and in 1965, the Board of Trustees of the California State Colleges voted to build a new campus on the west side of Dominguez Hill, which became California State University, Dominguez Hills. Today, the descendants of the Dominguez family operate the Watson Land Company and the Carson Companies on the original Rancho land.

== Historic sites ==
- Dominguez Rancho Adobe. The adobe of Manuel Dominguez, completed in 1826, is a national historic site.
- Battle of Dominguez Rancho. A Mexican–American War battle was fought on the rancho site.
- The Claretian Missionaries seminary and regional headquarters are adjacent to the Dominguez Rancho Adobe, where they established a base circa 1900.
- Eagle Tree. The tree that was the marker for the border of the ranch fell in 2022.

== See also ==
- Ranchos of California
- List of Ranchos of California
- Ranchos of Los Angeles County
- Dominguez Slough
