= Battle of Dominguez Rancho =

1847 battle of the Mexican-American War

- Part of the Conquest of California of the Mexican–American War
Date	8–9 October 1846
Location	Rancho San Pedro, Alta California (near modern-day Compton and Rancho Dominguez, California, U.S.) 33°52′1″N 118°13′3″W
Result	Mexican and Californio victory: Americans retreat to San Pedro Bay and flee to Monterey on the USS Savannah; Mexicans hold Pueblo de Los Angeles until Americans return in January 1847

Belligerents
United States	Mexico

Commanders and leaders
(United States) William Mervine	José Carrillo; José Flores

Strength
Total: 379; 285 U.S. Marines	Total: 90 Militia; 50 lancers; 1 swivel cannon

Casualties and losses
Total: 22; 10 killed; 4 Marines died in battle; 6 Marines died of wounds; 12 wounded	None

The Battle of Dominguez Rancho, or the Battle of the Old Woman's Gun, was a military engagement of the Mexican–American War that took place on October 8–9, 1846, within Manuel Dominguez's 75,000-acre (30,000 ha) Rancho San Pedro. Captain José Antonio Carrillo, leading fifty California troops, successfully held off an invasion of Pueblo de Los Angeles by some 300 United States Marines, capturing for the first time in the few instances of U.S. history the U.S. Colors upon the battlefield, while under the command of US Navy Captain William Mervine, who was attempting to recapture the town after the Siege of Los Angeles. By strategically running horses across the dusty Dominguez Hills, while transporting their single small cannon to various sites, Carrillo and his troops fooled the Americans into thinking they had encountered a large enemy force. Faced with heavy casualties and the superior fighting skills displayed by the Californios, the remaining Marines were forced to retreat to their ships docked in San Pedro Bay.

== Background ==
After receiving word of the Siege of Los Angeles, Commodore Robert F. Stockton sent US Navy Captain William Mervine and the frigate Savannah on October 4 to San Pedro to assist Captain Archibald H. Gillespie. Arriving on October 7, Mervine set out on October 8 with sailors, Marines and bear flaggers to recapture the town. (Note: there is confusion about the exact dates of the events, with some sources believing them to be a day earlier.)

== Battle ==
Having little knowledge of the enemy, Mervine planned his march poorly. It began inauspiciously with the death by friendly fire of a cabin boy upon landing. His troops were armed with an assortment of muskets, cutlasses and pikes; they brought no horses, wagons or cannons. The first leg of the march toward the pueblo, on October 8, was a six-hour dusty slog with little or no water, during which they were harassed by the enemy on the hillsides around them. Mervine and his troops reached the abandoned Dominguez Rancho, where they camped for the night, within view of an advance detachment of Flores' troops. There was sporadic firing from the enemy during the night, with no other effect than that of depriving Mervine's party of sleep. Setting off at daylight the next day, the Americans advanced just to the north of Dominguez Rancho.

When the Americans had occupied Los Angeles in August, residents had hidden some weapons by burying them. General José Flores' force, equipped with lances, knives and old firearms that had been hidden, was nearly as poorly armed, but it did have a cannon.

This old brass four-pounder, used ceremonially in the Los Angeles Plaza, had been buried in the garden of Inocencia Reyes. It was dug up and mounted on a horse-drawn limber. (In another account, the "old Woman" is identified as Clara Cota de Reyes. It is said that she had buried the small cannon in a cane patch near her home with the help of her daughters, one of whom was named Inocencia.) Señora Reyes' four-pounder was mounted on a homemade carriage and dragged on the narrow trail that the Americans needed to use. Ropes (probably lassos or riatas) were lashed to the limber to pull the gun into the brush for reloading. The Californio horsemen deployed at a safe distance from the trail on the enemy's flanks. The simple tactics proved effective. When the Americans came within 400 yards, the cannon was fired and quickly pulled back into the brush, followed by musket fire from the horsemen.

The advance toward Los Angeles came to a halt only three to four miles up the road, in the vicinity of what is now Compton Creek.

"…the enemy appeared before us, drawn up on each side of the road, mounted on fine horses, each man armed with a lance and carbine. They also had a field piece (a four-pounder) to which were hitched eight or ten horses, placed on the road ahead of us." (Robert Duvall, 117)

What followed was a running battle in which Mervine attempted to push forward, but was driven back time and time again by volley fire from the Mexicans. The horsemen used their lassos to pull the cannon from its carriage, out of the reach of the American soldiers whenever they tried to capture it. The Californios were able to stay well back and keep the Americans at bay. The gun was loaded with anything that would shoot: round shot, copper grapeshot, cannonballs, as well as metal scraps and cobblestone. The small projectiles fired like buckshot. Several historians have remarked that the Californios had little gunpowder at their disposal, manufactured at the Mission San Gabriel, and not much of that. Some have considered that lack of powder was the reason cannon fire ceased during Mervine's retreat. This phase of the battle lasted only a couple of hours.

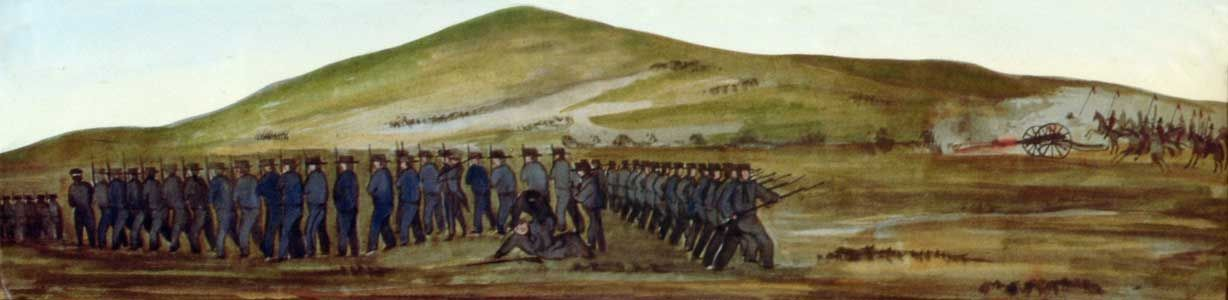
The Retreat of the Americans can be seen in "Battle of Dominguez Rancho" as depicted by William H. Meyers in Naval Sketches of the War in California, published in 1939 (the "Old Woman's Gun" can be seen on the right side of the painting)

At some point, Mervine and his lieutenants realized that they could not make forward progress, they could not capture the gun, and they had wounded needing care. As they were helpless on foot against a mounted enemy they could neither see nor count, Mervine had little choice except to retreat. The main battle lasted less than an hour; five hours later Mervine's forces were back on their ship in San Pedro Bay.

== Aftermath ==
Four of the seriously wounded Americans died and, along with the cabin boy, were buried on a little island in San Pedro Bay called Isla de los Muertos (Island of the Dead.). Mervine's troops reboarded the Savannah, and after a few days, the warship sailed north toward Monterey. "The captured American flag" was later taken to Mexico City by Antonio Coronel, who had been in charge of ordnance during the battle. The fate of the old woman's gun is unclear. Some say it was surrendered to the Americans after the Capitulation of Cahuenga; however, another account tells that the cannon was resurrected by the Californio dons in 1853 for the celebration of the Fourth of July. According to the account of one Major Horace Bell, a Los Angeles Ranger, Juan Sepulveda dug up the gun from near his own property and took it to Dead Man's Island, where he and his friends set it up near the graves of the Americans and fired a salute "in the exuberance of his patriotism." It is possible that the famous gun was displayed at the New Orleans Exposition of 1884-85 in the Navy Exhibit.

== See also ==
- Dominguez Rancho Adobe
- List of conflicts in the United States
- Battles of the Mexican–American War
