= West Rancho Dominguez, California =

Unincorporated community in California, United States

- Census designated place
- Interactive map of West Rancho Dominguez, California
- Location in the United States
- Coordinates: 33°53′39″N 118°15′59″W
- Country: United States
- State: California
- County: Los Angeles

Area
  - Total: 3.979 sq mi (10.305 km^{2})
  - Land: 3.974 sq mi (10.292 km^{2})
  - Water: 0.0054 sq mi (0.014 km^{2}) 0%
- Elevation: 82 ft (25 m)

Population (2020)
  - Total: 24,347
  - Density: 6,126.9/sq mi (2,365.6/km^{2})
- Time zone: UTC-8 (Pacific)
  - Summer (DST): UTC-7 (PDT)
- ZIP codes: 90220 & 90248
- Area code: 310
- FIPS code: 06-84186
- GNIS feature IDs: 1867070, 2409548

West Rancho Dominguez, formerly known as West Compton and also known as East Gardena, is an unincorporated census-designated place (CDP) located in southern Los Angeles County, California, United States. Per the 2020 census, the population was 24,347. The community lies to the west (but is not a part) of the city of Compton. The ZIP Codes encompassing the CDP area are 90220 and 90248.

== Geography ==
According to the United States Census Bureau, the CDP has a total area of 4.0 square miles (10.3 km^{2}), of which over 99% is land. Before the 2020 census, part of the Willowbrook CDP was transferred to the West Rancho Dominguez CDP, more than doubling its area.

== Demographics ==
Historical population
Census	Pop.	Note	%±
1970	5,748		—
1980	5,907		2.8%
1990	5,451		−7.7%
2000	5,435		−0.3%
2010	5,669		4.3%
2020	24,347		329.5%
U.S. Decennial Census; 1850–1870 1880-1890; 1900 1910 1920; 1930 1940 1950; 1960 1970 1980; 1990 2000 2010; 2020

West Rancho Dominguez first appeared as an unincorporated community in the 1970 U.S. census under the name West Compton; and then as a census designated place in the 1980 United States census. The name was change to West Rancho Dominguez for the 2010 U.S. census.

=== Racial and ethnic composition ===
West Rancho Dominguez CDP, California – Racial and ethnic composition Note: the US Census treats Hispanic/Latino as an ethnic category. This table excludes Latinos from the racial categories and assigns them to a separate category. Hispanics/Latinos may be of any race.
Race / Ethnicity (NH = Non-Hispanic)	Pop 2000	Pop 2010	Pop 2020	% 2000	% 2010	% 2020
White alone (NH)	87	73	434	1.60%	1.29%	1.78%
Black or African American alone (NH)	3,337	2,909	9,745	61.40%	51.31%	40.03%
Native American or Alaska Native alone (NH)	14	11	32	0.26%	0.19%	0.13%
Asian alone (NH)	48	45	240	0.88%	0.79%	0.99%
Native Hawaiian or Pacific Islander alone (NH)	22	15	66	0.40%	0.26%	0.27%
Other race alone (NH)	9	14	117	0.17%	0.25%	0.48%
Mixed race or Multiracial (NH)	81	76	505	1.49%	1.34%	2.07%
Hispanic or Latino (any race)	1,837	2,526	13,208	33.80%	44.56%	54.25%
Total	5,435	5,669	24,347	100.00%	100.00%	100.00%

West Rancho Dominguez lost its Black majority status in the 2020 U.S. census leaving only two communities in the entire state delineated by the U.S. Census Bureau that have Black majority populations.

=== 2020 census ===
As of the 2020 census, West Rancho Dominguez had a population of 24,347. The median age was 35.5 years. 24.4% of residents were under the age of 18 and 12.9% of residents were 65 years of age or older. For every 100 females there were 90.1 males, and for every 100 females age 18 and over there were 87.9 males age 18 and over.

100.0% of residents lived in urban areas, while 0.0% lived in rural areas.

There were 6,479 households in West Rancho Dominguez, of which 42.6% had children under the age of 18 living in them. Of all households, 38.1% were married-couple households, 17.4% were households with a male householder and no spouse or partner present, and 38.2% were households with a female householder and no spouse or partner present. About 16.8% of all households were made up of individuals and 7.5% had someone living alone who was 65 years of age or older.

There were 6,652 housing units, of which 2.6% were vacant. The homeowner vacancy rate was 0.5% and the rental vacancy rate was 2.3%.

Racial composition as of the 2020 census
Race	Number	Percent
White	1,944	8.0%
Black or African American	9,966	40.9%
American Indian and Alaska Native	368	1.5%
Asian	268	1.1%
Native Hawaiian and Other Pacific Islander	76	0.3%
Some other race	9,242	38.0%
Two or more races	2,483	10.2%
Hispanic or Latino (of any race)	13,208	54.2%

=== 2010 ===
At the 2010 census the CDP had a population of 5,669. The population density was 3,430.8 inhabitants per square mile (1,324.6/km^{2}). The racial makeup of the CDP was 1,054 (18.6%) White (1.3% Non-Hispanic White), 2,974 (52.5%) African American, 32 (0.6%) Native American, 46 (0.8%) Asian, 21 (0.4%) Pacific Islander, 1,354 (23.9%) from other races, and 188 (3.3%) from two or more races. There were 2,256 people of Hispanic or Latino ancestry, of any race (44.6%).

The census reported that 5,654 people (99.7% of the population) lived in households, 12 (0.2%) lived in non-institutionalized group quarters, and 3 (0.1%) were institutionalized.

There were 1,537 households, 774 (50.4%) had children under the age of 18 living in them, 623 (40.5%) were opposite-sex married couples living together, 505 (32.9%) had a female householder with no husband present, 139 (9.0%) had a male householder with no wife present. There were 88 (5.7%) unmarried opposite-sex partnerships, and 10 (0.7%) same-sex married couples or partnerships. 210 households (13.7%) were one person and 102 (6.6%) had someone living alone who was 65 or older. The average household size was 3.68. There were 1,267 families (82.4% of households); the average family size was 3.98.

The age distribution was 1,661 people (29.3%) under the age of 18, 636 people (11.2%) aged 18 to 24, 1,449 people (25.6%) aged 25 to 44, 1,241 people (21.9%) aged 45 to 64, and 682 people (12.0%) who were 65 or older. The median age was 32.9 years. For every 100 females there were 88.7 males. For every 100 females age 18 and over, there were 82.3 males.

There were 1,582 housing units at an average density of 957.4 per square mile, of the occupied units 1,114 (72.5%) were owner-occupied and 423 (27.5%) were rented. The homeowner vacancy rate was 1.1%; the rental vacancy rate was 2.1%. 4,129 people (72.8% of the population) lived in owner-occupied housing units and 1,525 people (26.9%) lived in rental housing units.

During 2009–2013, West Rancho Dominguez had a median household income of $45,373, with 17.2% of the population living below the federal poverty line.

=== 2000 ===
At the 2000 census there were 5,435 people, 1,535 households, and 1,209 families in the CDP. The population density was 3,313.0 inhabitants per square mile (1,279.2/km^{2}). There were 1,576 housing units at an average density of 960.7 per square mile (370.9/km^{2}). The racial makeup of the CDP was 67.9% African American, 4.1% White, 0.6% Native American, 0.9% Asian, 0.4% Pacific Islander, 22.5% from other races, and 3.5% from two or more races. Hispanic or Latino residents of any race were 33.8% of the population. Non-Hispanic whites comprised 1.6%.

Of the 1,535 households 37.9% had children under the age of 18 living with them, 44.8% were married couples living together, 26.3% had a female householder with no husband present, and 21.2% were non-families. 17.0% of households were one person and 8.5% were one person aged 65 or older. The average household size was 3.53 and the average family size was 3.90.

The age distribution was 33.2% under the age of 18, 10.1% from 18 to 24, 26.6% from 25 to 44, 17.7% from 45 to 64, and 12.3% 65 or older. The median age was 31 years. For every 100 females there were 91.6 males. For every 100 females age 18 and over, there were 84.9 males.

The median household income was $38,000 and the median family income was $40,280. Males had a median income of $28,719 versus $24,954 for females. The per capita income for the CDP was $12,255. About 14.2% of families and 17.0% of the population were below the poverty line, including 21.4% of those under age 18 and 13.8% of those age 65 or over.

== Education ==
Compton Unified School District and Los Angeles Unified School District serve portions of West Rancho Dominguez.

== Government ==
In the California State Legislature, West Rancho Dominguez is in the 35th senatorial district, represented by Democrat Laura Richardson, and in the 65th Assembly district, represented by Democrat Mike Gipson.

In the United States House of Representatives, West Rancho Dominguez is in California's 43rd congressional district, represented by Democrat Maxine Waters.
