= Fallesen =

Fallesen is a Danish surname. Notable people with the surname include:

- Edvard Fallesen (1817–1894), Danish army officer, politician, and theatre manager
- Steffan Sondermark Fallesen (born 1981), Danish internet entrepreneur
