= Steffan =

Steffan may refer to:

Surname:

- Dan Steffan, American cartoonist and writer
- Johann Gottfried Steffan (1815–1905), Swiss landscapist
- Joseph Anton Steffan (1726–1797), or Josef Antonín Štěpán, a composer originally from Bohemia
- Joseph Steffan (born 1964), American lawyer and gay activist

Given name:

- Steffan Cravos (born 1975), Welsh rap and hip hop artist
- Steffan Danielsen (1922–1976), Faroese painter
- Steffan Hughes English-born Welsh rugby league footballer
- Steffan Jones (born 1974), Welsh cricketer who plays for Somerset
- Steffan Lloyd (born 1998), Welsh cyclist
- Steffan O'Sullivan, the author of several role-playing game books
- Steffan Piolet (born 1988), English cricketer
- Steffan Rhodri, Welsh film actor, who has also worked frequently in television
- Steffan Sondermark Fallesen (born 1981), Internet entrepreneur
- Steffan Tubbs, radio host on Denver, Colorado's KOA, host of Colorado's Morning News

== See also ==
- Stephen
