= Servage =

Servage may refer to:

- Servage AB, Public traded Swedish IT firm
- Servage Hosting, an Internet hosting service
- Slavery
