= Gabriela Soto Laveaga =

- Education: University of California, San Diego California State University, Dominguez Hills
- Occupations: Historian, author
- Employer: Harvard University
- Notable work: Jungle Laboratories (2009)
- Website: www.sotolaveaga.com

Gabriela Soto Laveaga is a historian of science specializing in Latin America. She is currently a professor of the History of Science at Harvard University.

== Background ==
She received her B.A. from California State University, Dominguez Hills; her M.A. (1998) and doctorate in history (2001) from University of California, San Diego, with Eric Van Young as her mentor. Before joining the faculty at Harvard in 2016, she earned tenure in the history department at the University of California, Santa Barbara (2003–2016); and was assistant professor of history at Michigan State University (2002 to 2003). From 2019 to 2020, she was member at the Institute for Advanced Study in Princeton, New Jersey.

=== Awards ===
She received the 2010 Robert K Merton Best Book award for Jungle Laboratories and 2007 Latin American Studies Association Health, Science and Society Section Best Article Prize for Uncommon Trajectories.

== Bibliography ==
=== Book ===
- Jungle Laboratories: Mexican Peasants, National Projects, and the Making of The Pill. (Duke University Press, 2009), winner, 2010 Robert K. Merton Best Book Award in Science, Knowledge and Technology from the American Sociological Association.

=== Research articles ===
- "Moving from, and beyond, invented categories: afterwords,” Decolonizing Histories in Theory and Practice. Forum of History and Theory, 59:3, 2020: 439–447.
- "Largo dislocare: connecting microhistories to remap and recenter histories of science,” History and Technology, 34:1, 2018: 21–30.
- "Introduction,” Special Issue on Sciences from “Over There,” History and Technology, 34:1, 2018: 5–10.
- "Race and the Epigenetics of Memory,” Kalfou: Special Issue on Race and Science. Volume 5, Issue 1 Spring 2018: 54–60.
- "Roundtable: New Narratives of the Green Revolution,” Agriculture History, vol. 91, num. 3, Summer 2017:397–422.
- "Building the Nation of the Future, One Waiting Room at a Time: Hospitals in the Making of Modern Mexico," History and Technology edited by John Krige and Jessica Wang, Volume 31, Issue 3, July 2015, pages 275–294.
- "Mexico's Historical Solutions to Rural Health," in Health for All the Journey to Universal Health Coverage. York: Center for Global Health Histories, 2015.
- "Bringing the Revolution to Medical Schools: Social Service and Rural Health in 1930s Mexico", Mexican Studies/Estudios Mexicanos, vol. 29, num.2, Summer 2013:397–427.
- "Shadowing the Professional Class: Reporting Fictions in Doctors’ Strikes" Special issue on secret service archives. Journal of Iberian and Latin American Research, Summer 2013, 19:1, 30–40.
- "Seeing the Countryside through Medical Eyes: Social Service Reports in the Making of a Sickly Nation." Endeavour, vol. 37, Issue 1, 2013: 29–39.
- "Science and Public Health in the Century of Revolution," (with Claudia Agostoni), in William Beezley, ed. A Companion to Mexican History and Culture. John Wiley & Sons, 2011: 561–574.
- "Médicos, Hospitales y Servicios de Inteligencia" in Salud Colectiva. Buenos Aires: Instituto de Salud Colectiva, 7(1), Enero-Abril, 2011: 87–97.
- "Searching for Molecules, Finding Rebellion: Echeverría's ‘Arriba y Adelante’ Populism in Southeastern Mexico" in Populism in twentieth- century Mexico: The presidencies of Lázaro Cárdenas and Luis Echeverría, edited by Amelia Kiddle and Maria Muñoz.
- "'Let's Become Fewer': Soap Operas, The Pill and Population Campaigns, 1976–1986." Sexuality Research and Social Policy Journal. September 2007, vol. 4, no. 3., 19–33.
- "Fabriquer la connaisance et refabriquer la citoyenneté du 'campesino,' dans le Mexique Rural" in Des Sciences Citoyennes? La Question de l’amateur dans les sciences naturalistes. Florian Charvolin and André Micoud and Lynn Nyhart (eds.) France:L’Aube, 2007, 233–249.
- "Uncommon Trajectories: Steroid Hormones, Mexican Peasants, and the Search for a Wild Yam" in Uncommon Trajectories: Steroid Hormones, Mexican Peasants, and the Search for a Wild Yam, Studies in History and Philosophy of Biological and Biomedical Sciences, University of Cambridge. Volume 36, Issue 4, December 2005: 743–760
- "The Social Relations of Mexican Commodities: Power, Production, and Place" in Casey Walsh, Elizabeth Ferry, Gabriela Soto Laveaga, Paola Sessia, and Sarah Hill, (contributors) La Jolla, Center for U.S. Mexican Press, 2003
- "En busca de la Medicina Moderna en la Herbolaria Pre-Hispánica: El caso de México 1974 -1976" Revista Horizontes, Universidade de San Francisco, São Paulo, Brazil. vol 21. Jan- Dec. 2003.
