= Royal Danish Theatre =

National Danish performing arts institution

- Det Kongelige Teater
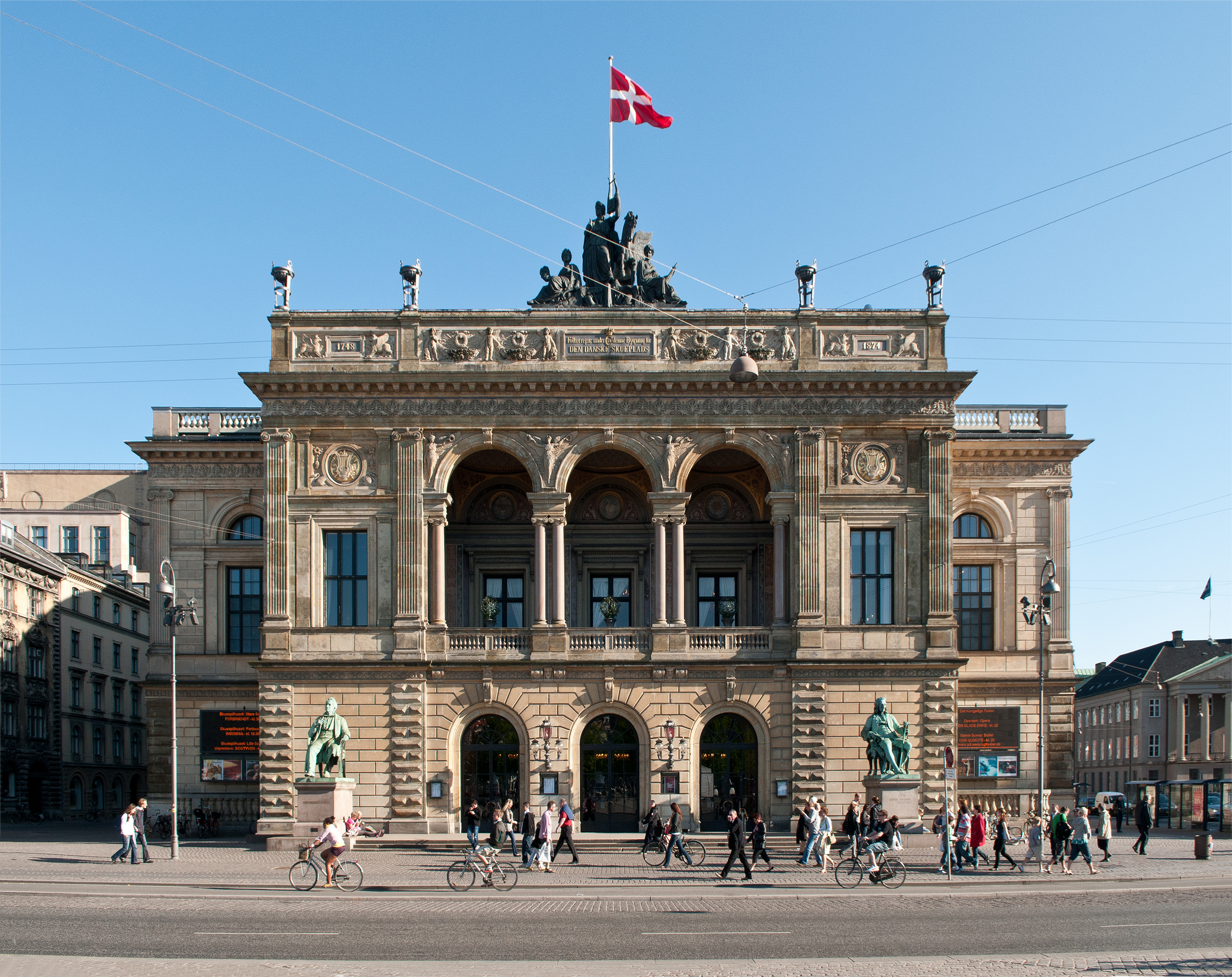
- The theatre seen from Kongens Nytorv
- Address: Kongens Nytorv; Copenhagen; Denmark
- Capacity: 1,600 seats
- Type: National theatre

Construction
- Opened: 1874; 152 years ago
- Architect: Vilhelm Dahlerup

Website
- kglteater.dk

The Royal Danish Theatre (RDT, Danish: Det Kongelige Teater) is the national Danish performing arts institution, founded in 1748. The name also refers to the former theatre building in Copenhagen.

== History ==
The Royal Danish Theatre was founded in 1748, first serving as the theatre of the king, and then as the theatre of the country. A purpose-built venue of the same name was constructed on Kongens Nytorv, Copenhagen, between 1872 and 1874 to the designs of Danish architect Vilhelm Dahlerup, in association with Ove Petersen.

Edvard Fallesen was the general director of the Royal Danish Theatre from 1876 until his death in 1894.

== Description ==
The term "Royal Danish Theatre" refers to both the national Danish performing arts institution, and its old purpose-built venue on Kongens Nytorv. The Royal Danish Theatre organisation is under the control of the Danish Ministry of Culture.

The theatre presents opera, the Royal Danish Ballet, multi-genre concerts, and drama in several locations.

The RDT's performing arts venues have included the following:

- The Old Stage is the original Royal Danish Theatre built in 1874.
- The Copenhagen Opera House (Operaen), built in 2004.
- Stærekassen (New Stage) is an Art Deco theatre adjacent to the main theatre. It was used for drama productions. It is no longer used by the Royal Theatre.
- The Royal Danish Playhouse is a venue for "spoken theatre" with three stages, inaugurated in 2008.

== In popular culture ==
- The Royal Theatre on Kongens Nytorv is a central location in the 1978 Olsen-banden film The Olsen Gang Sees Red (from 1:16:58).
- The Royal Theatre is the location of several important scenes in the 2015 drama film The Danish Girl where Einar (Eddie Redmayne) begins to acknowledge her feminine side.

== See also ==
- Copenhagen Opera House
- Det Danske Teater, a former touring theatre
- Royal Danish Ballet
- Royal Danish Ballet school
- Royal Danish Orchestra
