= California State University, Dominguez Hills =

Public university in Carson, California, US

- Former names: South Bay State College (1960–1962); California State College at Palos Verdes (1962–1966); California State College, Dominguez Hills (1966–1977)
- Motto: Vox Veritas Vita (Latin)
- Motto in English: "Voice, Truth, Life"
- Type: Public university
- Established: 1960; 66 years ago
- Parent institution: California State University
- Accreditation: WSCUC
- Academic affiliations: CUMU
- Endowment: $26.55 million (2024)
- Budget: $224.4 million (2024-25)
- President: Mary Ann Villarreal (interim)
- Provost: Phillip LaPolt (interim)
- Faculty: 678
- Students: 14,262 (fall 2024)
- Undergraduates: 12,473 (fall 2024)
- Postgraduates: 1,789 (fall 2024)
- Location: Carson, California, United States; 33°51′53″N 118°15′22″W
- Campus: 346 acres (140 ha); Small city
- Newspaper: The Bulletin
- Colors: Burgundy and gold
- Nickname: Toros
- Sporting affiliations: NCAA Division II – CCAA
- Website: csudh.edu
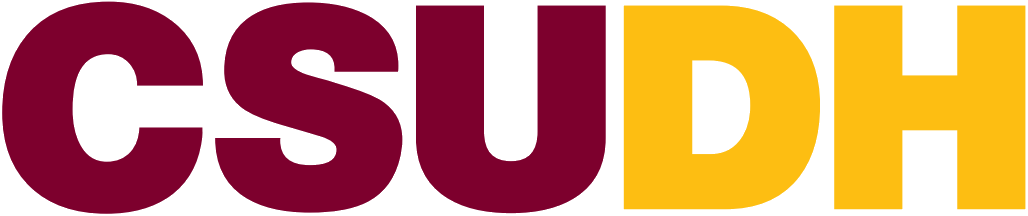

California State University, Dominguez Hills (CSUDH, CSU Dominguez Hills, or Cal State Dominguez Hills) is a public university in Carson, California, United States. It was founded in 1960 and is part of the California State University (CSU) system.

In 2020, the university had an enrollment of 17,763 students, comprising 15,873 undergraduates (89.4%) and 1,890 post baccalaureates (10.6%). About half of all students identify as the first in their families to go to college. CSUDH is one of the most ethnically and economically diverse universities in the western United States. It enrolls the largest number and percentage of African American students of any CSU campus.

CSUDH offers 53 bachelor's degree programs, 26 Masters programs, a variety of single, multi-subject and specialized teaching credentials, and undergraduate, graduate, and post-baccalaureate certificate programs within its six colleges: College of Arts and Humanities, College of Business Administration and Public Policy, College of Education, College of Extended and International Education, College of Health, Human Services and Nursing, and College of Natural and Behavioral Sciences. The university is accredited by the WASC Senior College and University Commission (WSCUC). It is designated as a Hispanic-Serving Institution.

The campus is carved from the historic Rancho San Pedro, the site of the First Spanish Land Grant in California. The land remained in the continuous possession of the Dominguez family through seven generations – from its concession to Juan Jose Domínguez in 1784 to its division and acquisition by the state of California for the university. The campus mascot is the Toro.

== History ==
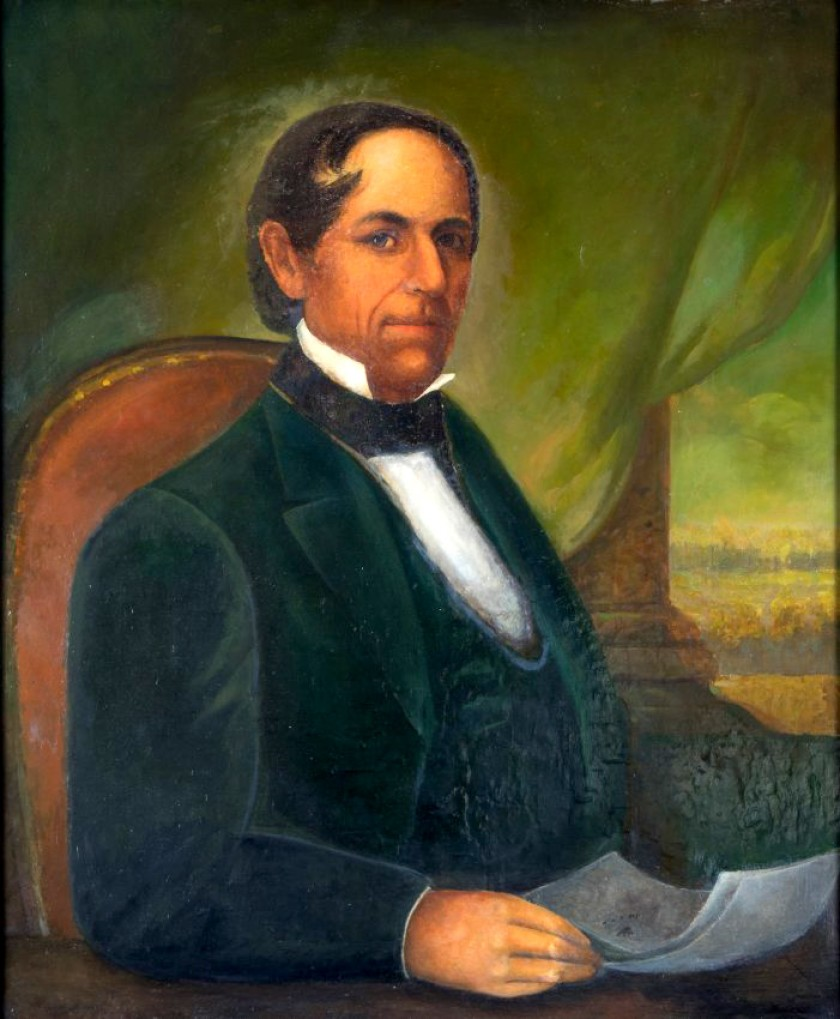
The Dominguez Hills are named for the family of Don Manuel Domínguez, a Californio politician, signer of the Californian Constitution and owner of Rancho San Pedro, whose lands included the site where campus is located. The CSUDH Library's Gerth Archives house his family's collections.

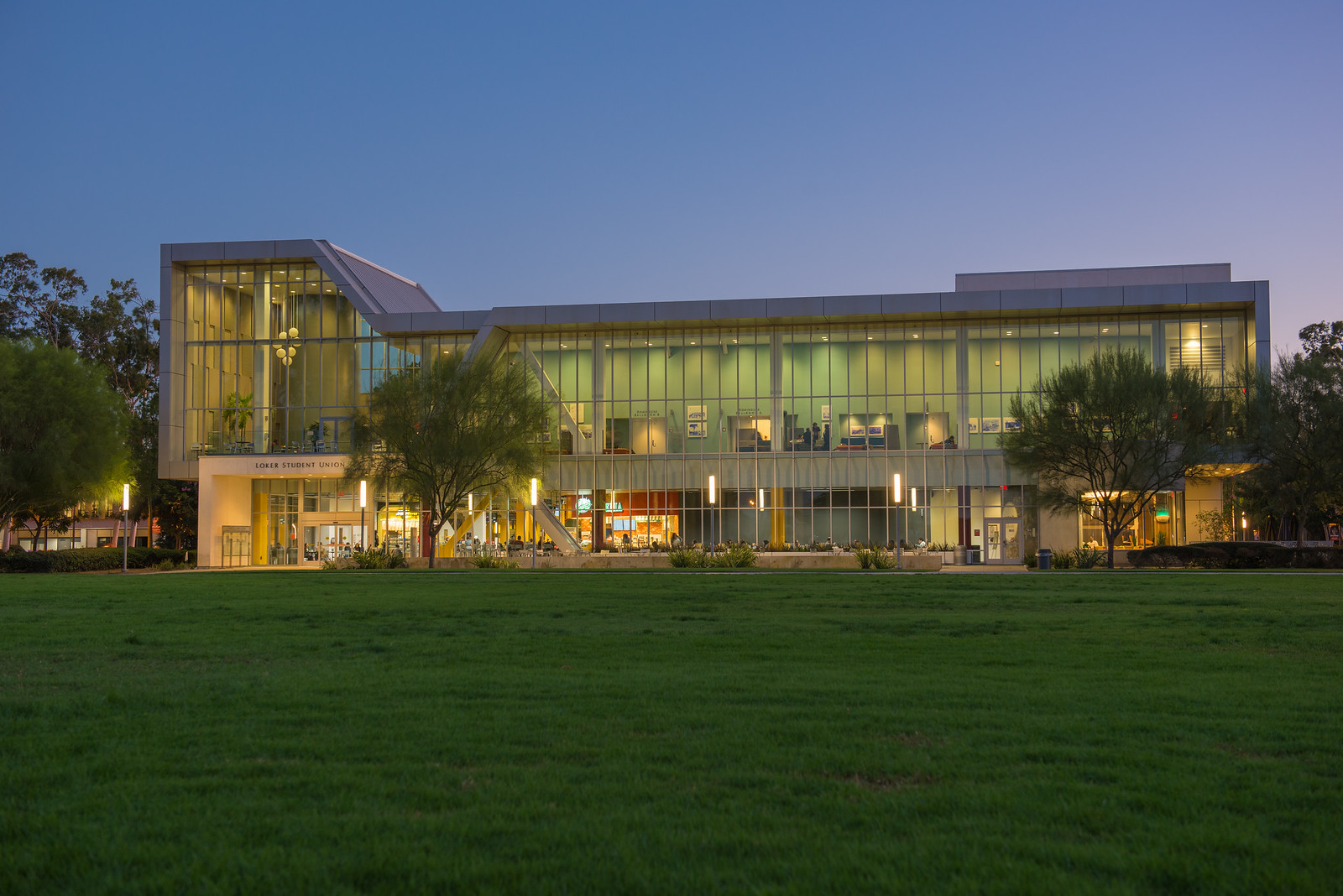
Exterior of Loker Student Union, on the campus of CSUDH.

The foundation for what would become CSU Dominguez Hills was built in 1960 when then Governor of California Pat Brown provided state funds to begin development of the campus. It was originally to be located in Palos Verdes, California, and known as South Bay State College. The tentative name was changed to California State College at Palos Verdes in 1962. In 1964, architect A. Quincy Jones designed a master plan for construction. As the permanent campus had not yet been constructed, the first classes were held in 1965 at the California Federal Savings Bank in Rolling Hills Estates, California. The college began with an enrollment of approximately 40 students.

In 1965 the designated location for the campus was moved to the Dominguez Hills in Carson. The Palos Verdes site was abandoned due to high land prices in Palos Verdes, and the Watts Riots exposing a need for a campus to serve the populations of South Los Angeles.

The university was established, in large part, as a response to the African American outcry for higher education standards and opportunities. In October and November 1969, demonstrations regarding the Vietnam War were held on the campus. In 1977 the California Postsecondary Education Commission endorsed the college trustees' desire to change the name of the school from California State College, Dominguez Hills to California State University, Dominguez Hills.

CSUDH was selected as the host venue for 1984 Los Angeles Summer Olympics cycling competition. Between 1981 and 1982, the Olympic Velodrome was constructed on the campus. The US cycling team won nine gold medals on the track during the Olympics. The 333.3-meter-long track was demolished in 2003 and replaced by the ADT Event Center (now known as the VELO Sports Center) in 2004. It remains the only Olympic-standard velodrome in the United States.

In 1992, the university opened the Donald P. and Katherine B. Loker Student Union. A major expansion was completed in 2007, adding the 800-seat Dominguez Ballroom. The CSUDH Extended Education Building was opened in 2000, followed by the completion of James L. Welch Hall in 2002. It was named after a long-time CSUDH faculty member.

In 2021, CSUDH opened three major new on-campus buildings, designed to expand the campus' academic capabilities and help transform the campus from a commuter school to a destination institution. The new Student Resident Housing complex can accommodate over 500 students. The complex includes double, triple, and quadruple bedrooms, a laundry room, study rooms, several lounges, and other amenities. It features eight 47-foot-high murals by Los Angeles artist iris yirei hu. The Science and Innovation Building houses the university's chemistry, biology, and physics programs. It is also the home of the Toyota Center for Innovation in STEM Education, which includes a fabrication lab, SMART classrooms, and labs for K-12 teacher demonstrations. The campus' Innovation and Instruction Building is the home of the university's College of Business Administration and Public Policy. The building includes a 250-seat auditorium, collaborative learning classrooms, distance learning spaces, event spaces, and faculty offices.

Within contemporary history, in the year 2022 Cal State Dominguez Hills had the distinction of having five of its graduates simultaneously serving as mayors of cities in LA County. They are Long Beach Mayor Rex Richardson, Compton, California Mayor Emma Sharif, Carson, California Mayor Lula Davis-Holmes, Hawthorne, California Mayor Alex Vargas and Los Angeles Mayor Karen Bass.

=== Presidents ===
Since its establishment in 1960, the university has had eight permanent presidents. While eleven people have served as president, four served interim terms: John A. Brownell from 1987 to 1989, Herbert Carter from 1998 to 1999, Boice Bowman in 2007, and Willie J. Hagan from 2012 to 2013. However, Hagan was appointed the seventh permanent president and served an additional five-year term as president from 2013 to 2018. Thomas A. Parham served as president from (2018-2025). Mary Ann Villarreal is the current interim president.

By name and years of service, they are:

- Leo F. Cain (1962–1976)
- Donald R. Gerth (1976–1984)
- Richard Butwell (1984–1987)
- John A. Brownell (interim 1987–1989)
- Robert C. Detweiler (1989–1998)
- Herbert Carter (interim 1998–1999)
- James E. Lyons, Sr. (1999–2007)
- Boice Bowman (Interim 2007)
- Mildred García (2007–2012)
- Willie J. Hagan (interim 2012–2013; 2013–2018)
- Thomas A. Parham (2018-2025)
- Mary Ann Villarreal (interim since 2026)

== Academics ==
Undergraduate admission statistics
	Fall 2025	Fall 2024	Fall 2023	Fall 2022	Fall 2021
First-time Freshmen
Applicants	19,764	20,442	19,685	19,313	16,741
Admits	18,615	18,586	17,388	17,082	14,999
Admit rate	94%	91%	88%	88%	90%
Enrolled	1,652	1,732	1,721	2,062	2,048
Yield rate	9%	9%	10%	12%	14%
Transfers
Applicants	7,923	8,301	7,833	8,595	10,436
Admits	7,079	7,598	6,251	7,592	9,366
Admit rate	89%	92%	80%	88%	90%
Enrolled	1,998	1,891	1,529	1,939	2,711
Yield rate	28%	25%	24%	26%	29%

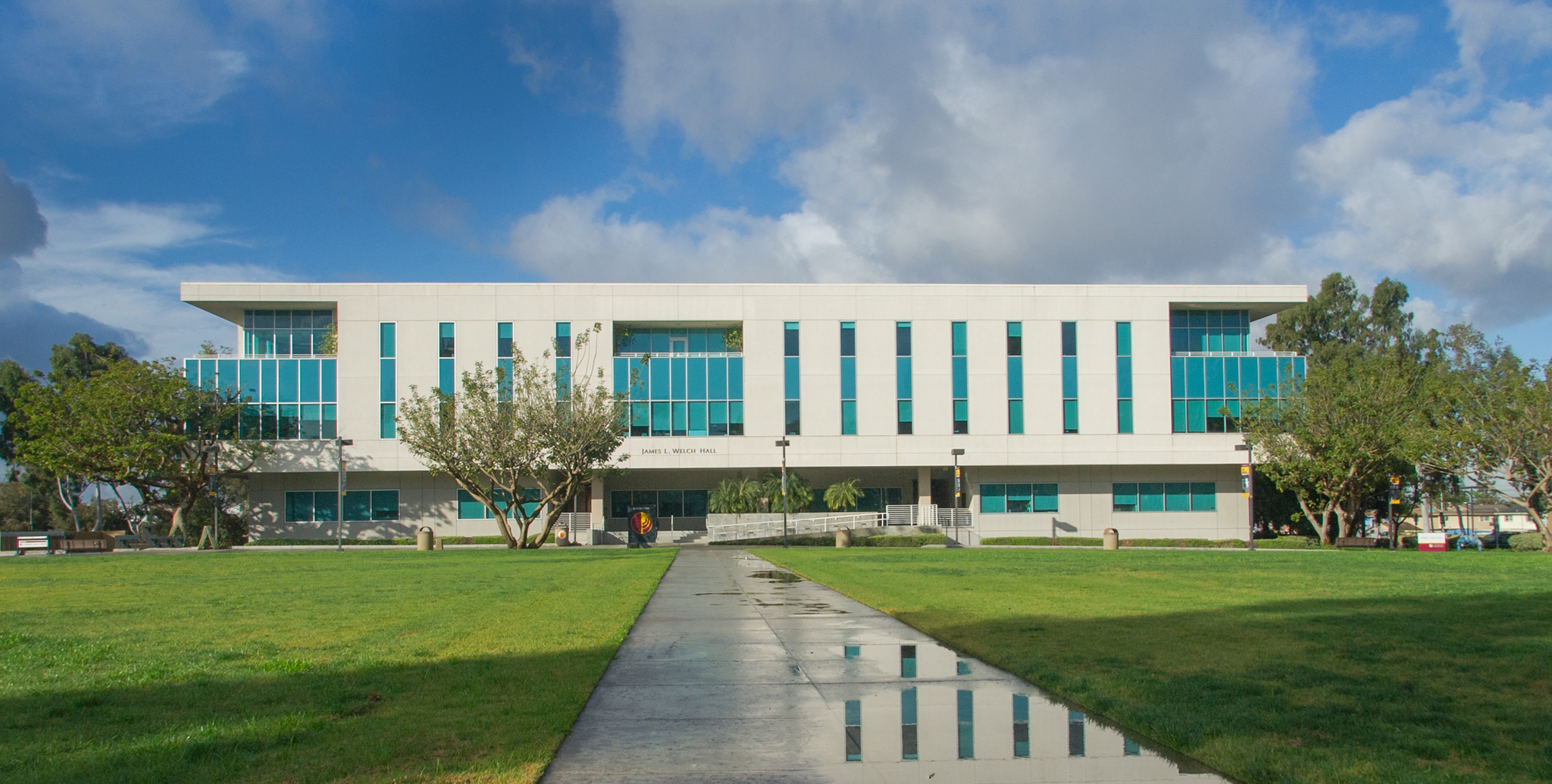
Welch Hall on the CSUDH campus.

CSU Dominguez Hills is a major university for the Southern geographical region of Los Angeles County and Orange County. It offers 53 undergraduate majors, 26 master's degrees, and a number of certificate and credential programs. The campus is accredited by the following associations: Western Association of Schools and Colleges, the Association of Collegiate Business Schools and Programs, AACSB International, the National Association of Schools of Public Affairs and Administration, the National Association of Schools of Music, and the National Association of Schools of Theatre. Dominguez Hills is also the administrative headquarters of the California State University's Statewide Nursing Program.

CSUDH has been designated a Hispanic-Serving Institution and is a member of the Computing Alliance of Hispanic-Serving Institutions. Its College of Education & College of Arts and Humanities offers training in Spanish for bilingual education teachers. As of 2018, CSUDH had the third largest percentage of Latino Americans that are not Mexican-American in the CSU system. (Latino Americans with heritage from the Caribbean, Central America, South America). The university ranked first in California in 2021 for the number of bachelor's degrees conferred on Black students.

The campus is home to the American Indian Institute, which has the goal of increasing the number of Indigenous students who enroll and graduate from the CSU system. Starting in 2011, CSUDH and the AII began hosting the "Honoring the Indigenous Peoples of the Americas" Pow Wow.

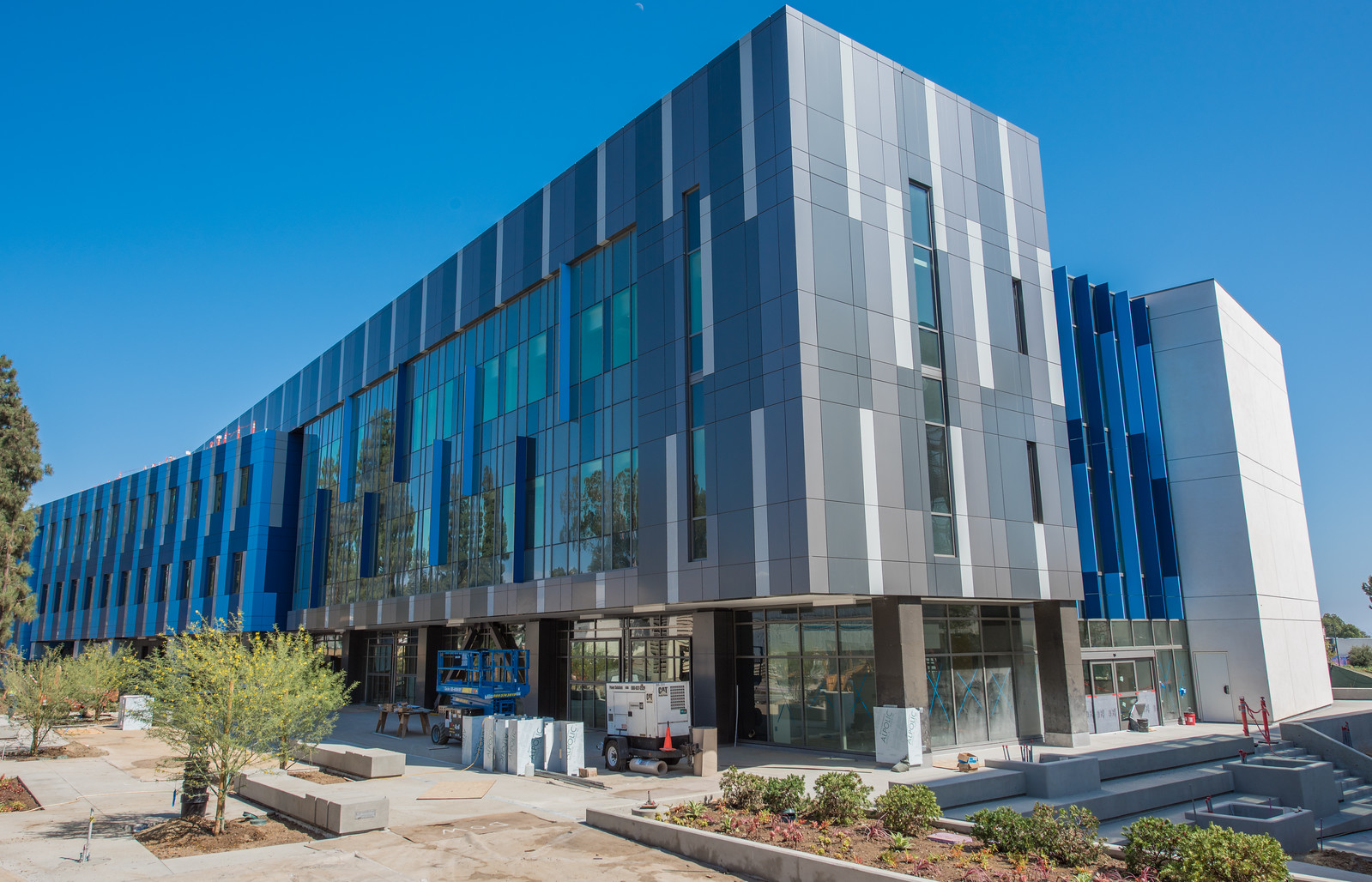
CSUDH Science and Innovation Building

CSUDH students conduct research and present their findings at the campus' Annual Student Research Day. The annual event is open to undergraduate and graduate students. Outstanding research projects are selected for inclusion at the CSU Statewide Student Research Competition.

CSUDH's McNair Scholars Program was established in 2004. It is named after NASA mission specialist Ronald McNair, who died in the 1986 Space Shuttle Challenger explosion. The program's goal is to support and fund first-generation, low-income, and/or underrepresented students preparing for future doctoral studies. The program provides a variety of academic support and services. As of 2021, the program has achieved a 93% graduate school acceptance rate.

In 2014, following its acquisition of 21 new Steinway-designed pianos, CSUDH was named an All-Steinway School, the first public four-year university in California to receive the designation. These instruments are subject to periodic inspections by Steinway factory representatives.

Sixty-five percent of CSUDH students engage in service learning, both through the formal curriculum and the university's service learning hub, the Center for Service Learning, Internships & Civic Engagement (SLICE). The university was Presidential Winner of the 2014 President's Higher Education Community Service Honor Roll. The Presidential Award is the highest federal recognition an institution can receive for its commitment to community, service-learning, and civic engagement.

The university focuses on the STEM disciplines, hosting the Annual STEM in Education Conference, offering the First-Year Undergraduate STEM Experience (FUSE), and in 2014 hosting the Women in STEM Conference. Its Center for Innovation in STEM Education was established in 2014 by a donation from the Annenberg Foundation and aims to improve local education with various STEM initiatives. CSUDH offers a Bachelor of Science in Computer Science, a Bachelor of Arts in Computer Technology with an option to concentrate in Homeland Security, and a Bachelor of Science in Information Technology. In 2017, it received a $4 million grant from Toyota to create an 87,000-square foot Science and Innovation Building to prepare students for careers in science, technology, engineering and math. The Toyota Center for Innovation in STEM Education, housed inside the building, includes a fabrication lab, high-tech classrooms, collaborative workspaces, and labs for K-12 teacher training.

=== Undergraduate programs ===
Undergraduate demographics as of fall 2024
Race and ethnicity	Total
Hispanic	68.2%
Black	12.2%
Asian	7.7%
White	4.8%
Unknown	2.5%
Two or more races	2.4%
Foreign national	2.0%
Native Hawaiian/Pacific Islander	0.2%
Economic diversity
Low-income (Note: The percentage of students who received an income-based federal Pell grant intended for low-income students.)	62%
Affluent (Note: The percentage of students who are a part of the American middle class at the bare minimum.)	38%

Popular majors for undergraduates in 2018 included Business Administration (Management and Operations) at 18.04%, Psychology (General) at 11.29%, Sociology at 8.01%. While popular majors for graduates were Education, General at 24.22%, Public Administration at 11.18%, and Registered Nursing, Nursing Administration, Nursing Research and Clinical Nursing at 10.31%

=== Rankings ===
In the 2024 US News and World Report rankings of universities in the "Regional Universities West" category, CSUDH was tied for 36.

2025–2026 USNWR Best Regional Colleges West Rankings
Top Performers on Social Mobility	13 (tie)
Top Public Schools	20
Nursing (tie)	249 (tie)

The 2024 USNWR Graduate Schools Rankings ranked CSUDH:

- 95 in Occupational Therapy
- 179 in Public Relations/Public Affairs
- 201 in Social Work

== Leo F. Cain Library and Gerth Archives ==
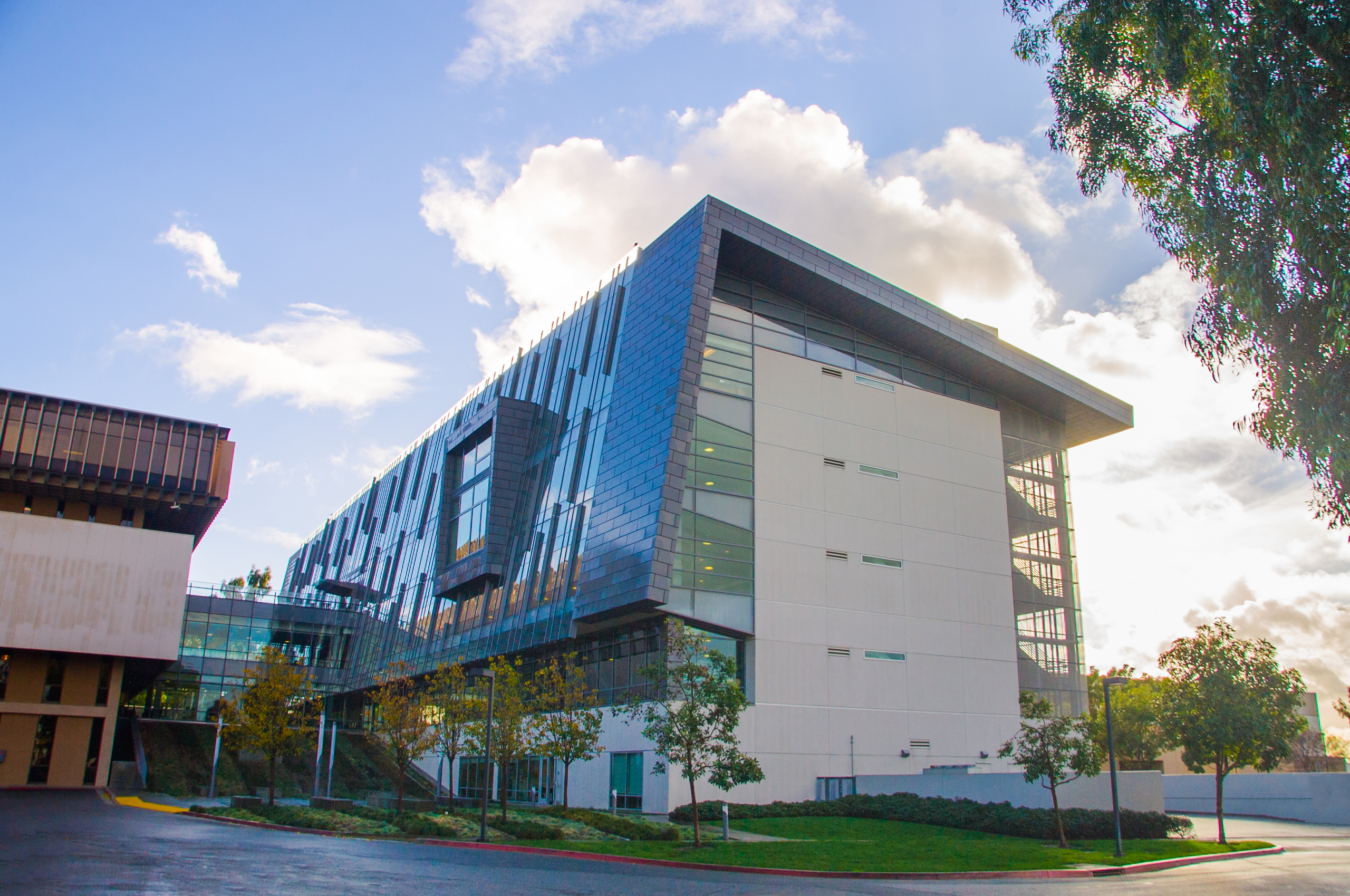
South wing of the Leo F. Cain University Library

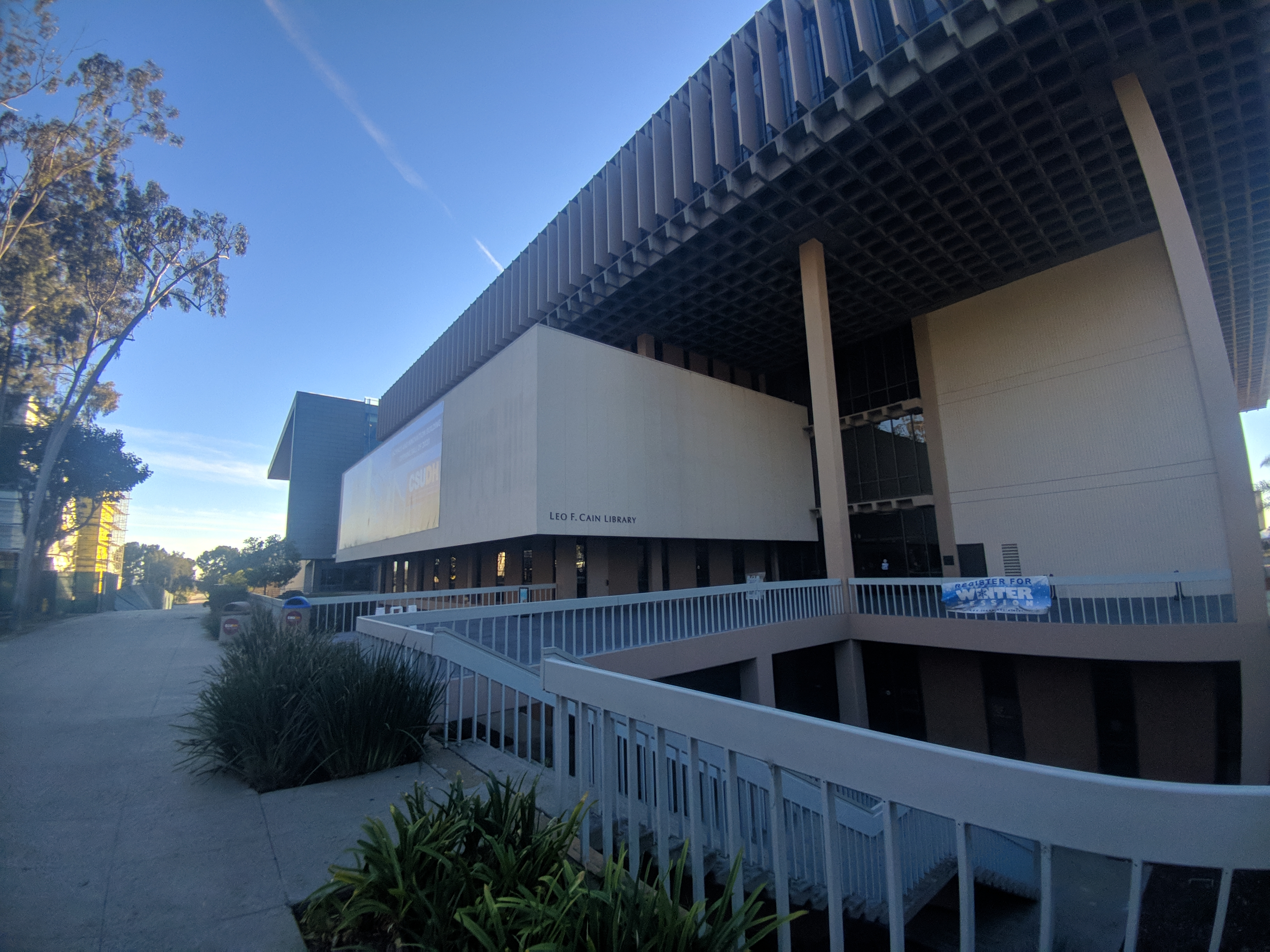
North wing of the Leo F. Cain University Library

CSUDH opened its Library South Wing to the Leo F. Cain University Library in 2010. The expansion was honored with a Best of 2010 Award for Architectural Design from the California Construction journal and a 2011 Project Achievement Award from the Construction Management Association of America.

The library houses the Donald R. and Beverly Gerth Archives and Special Collections, home to the CSUDH archives, digital and special collections, rare books, and the official archives of the California State University system. Among the collections maintained at the Gerth Archives are:

- California State University Japanese American Digitization Project (CSUJAD): A database consisting of primary documentation from 20 California institutions related to the history and progress of Japanese Americans in their communities. CSUDH has well over 25 physical collections on Japanese Americans including the Ninomiya Photo Studio Archives, with over 100,000 images.
- Holt Labor Library Collection: Focusing on radical political movements mostly in the 20th century, the collection consists of over 1,000 linear feet of books, pamphlets, periodicals, and manuscript collections focused on labor, civil rights women's rights and anti-war movements.
- Mayme Agnew Clayton Collection of African American History and Culture: A collection of more than 2 million rare books, films, documents, photographs, artifacts, and works of art related to the history and culture of African Americans in the United States, with a significant focus on Southern California and the American West.
- LA Free Press Collection: Archive of materials from Art Kunkin, publisher and editor of the Los Angeles Free Press, one of the first and most important underground newspapers of the late 1960s and early 1970s.
- Activist Collections: Materials on activism and social justice, including the Watts Labor Community Action Committee, Watts Rebellion Collection, Kaye Briegel Chicano Publication Collection, Feminist Resources Collection, Native American Activist Collection, Filipino Martial Law Materials, LGBTQ Periodical Collection, and other civil rights-related collections.

== Athletics ==
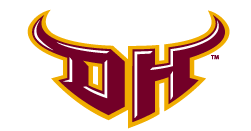
Athletics Logo

CSUDH's athletic teams are known as the 'Cal State Dominguez Hills Toros', and the university's colors are burgundy and gold. CSUDH competes against other universities in nine varsity sports, in Division II of the NCAA in the California Collegiate Athletic Association.

CSUDH fields teams in several varsity-level sports:

- Basketball (men and women)
- Soccer (men and women)
- Baseball (men)
- Softball (women)
- Volleyball (women)
- Golf (men)
- Track and Field (women)

The men's soccer team plays at Toro Stadium. Other sports venues include the Torodome for basketball and volleyball; Toro Field for baseball; and Toro Diamond for softball. Select home games are televised live via Internet TV.

=== Team accomplishments and notable alumni ===
The CSUDH men's soccer team has won two NCAA championships at the Division II level. In 2000, they defeated Barry University in the final by a score of 2–1. CSUDH won their second men's soccer title in 2008, beating Dowling College 3–0 in the final. Many CSUDH Toros have gone on to professional careers in Major League Soccer and other leagues around the world:

- Tony Alfaro
- Alex Bengard
- Derby Carrillo
- Alejandro Covarrubias
- Chase Gentry
- Kevin Hartman
- Kei Kamara
- Kyle Polak
- Gyasi Zardes

The CSUDH women's soccer team won the 1991 NCAA Division II Championship, defeating Sonoma State 2–1 in the final. The CSUDH softball team won the NCAA Division II in 2022.

The CSUDH men's golf team won the 2015, 2016, 2018, and 2019 PGA Works Collegiate Golf Championship, a tournament open to Historically Minority Colleges.

The CSUDH baseball team is a member of the California Collegiate Athletic Association (CCAA) in NCAA Division II. Several Toro alumni have gone on to play in Major League Baseball:

- DeWayne Buice
- Craig Grebeck
- Jim Pena
- Kevin Pillar
- Bubby Rossman
- George Stablein
- La Rue Washington

The CSUDH women's track and field 4X4 relay team won the NCAA Division II Championship in 2011. The CSUDH track and field team competes in the CCAA as well. Its most notable alumna is Carmelita Jeter, who won gold, silver, and bronze medals at the 2012 Olympic Games in London. Another notable alumna is Grace Ann Dinkins, a sprinter who competed for her native Liberia in the 1984, 1996, and 2000 Olympics.

== Esports ==
The CSUDH Esports Association was established in 2017. They have won three titles at national events sponsored by the National Esports Collegiate Conference (NECC): Valorant (Challengers Division) in 2020 and 2021; and Overwatch (Challengers Division) in 2021.

In 2021, it was announced that CSUDH would be constructing a new Esports Incubation Lab on the second floor of the Leo F. Cain Library on campus, to open in spring 2022. The facility will include a broadcasting booth, competition stage, and classroom with furnishings and technology provided through partnerships with electronics companies ViewSonic and HyperX.

== Dignity Health Sports Park ==
CSUDH is the home of Dignity Health Sports Park. Dignity Health Sports Park, formerly known as the Home Depot Center and StubHub Center, is a multiple-use sports complex on the West Coast of the United States, located on the campus of CSUDH. Its primary tenant is the LA Galaxy of Major League Soccer and its naming rights have been held since 2019 by health provider Dignity Health. The $150 million complex opened in 2003 and was developed by the Anschutz Entertainment Group, which remains the facility's operator. With a seating capacity of 27,000, it is the second-largest soccer-specific stadium in MLS, after BMO Field. During its first decade, the stadium's sponsor was hardware retailer The Home Depot, followed by six years of sponsorship by online ticket retailer StubHub. The Los Angeles Chargers of the National Football League used the stadium from 2017 until the completion of SoFi Stadium in 2020. The San Diego State Aztecs football team used the stadium as their home venue for the 2020 and 2021 seasons. The Los Angeles Wildcats of the XFL also played at the stadium during their one season of existence.

Dignity Health Sports Park was the site of the 2003 FIFA Women's World Cup Final. The United States men's and women's national soccer teams often use the facility for training camps and some home matches.

During the 2028 Summer Olympics, the venue will host rugby, archery, tennis, track cycling and field hockey. At the 2028 Summer Paralympics, the venue will host wheelchair tennis, track cycling and archery.

== Economic impact ==
CSU Dominguez Hills has over 110,000 alumni, of whom 60% live and work within 25 miles (40 km) of the campus. The university plays a major role in the region's economy — a recent economic impact study revealed CSU Dominguez Hills generates a total impact of $519 million annually in the South Bay. This impact sustains over 5,600 jobs in the region and statewide economy. Per year, the impact generates more than $45 million in statewide tax revenue. More than $2.1 billion of the earnings by alumni from CSU Dominguez Hills are attributable to their CSU degrees. The average amount of debt its students accumulate is $14,585.

== Notable people ==
=== Alumni ===
- Ronnie Aguilar – professional basketball player
- Cole Tomas Allen - suspect in the 2026 White House Correspondents' Dinner shooting
- Esther Anaya - In-house Deejay for Los Angeles Chargers
- Stewart Alexander – politician
- Tony Alfaro – professional soccer player
- Karen Bass, politician, mayor of Los Angeles, member of the House of Representatives from California's 37th congressional district (2013–2022)
- Alex Bengard – professional soccer player
- Glenn Berggoetz – filmmaker
- Tiffiny Blacknell – criminal defense attorney and community activist
- Steven Bradford – politician, State senator for the 35th district
- Patrick Burke – professional golfer
- Joe Buscaino – politician, member of the Los Angeles City Council
- Luis M. Campos – chemistry academic
- Josue Cartagena – professional soccer player
- Taleah Carter
- Derby Carrillo – professional soccer player
- Chris Conkling – screenwriter
- Chris Conrad – cannabis expert
- Jeff Coopwood – Emmy-nominated actor, broadcaster, educator
- Alejandro Covarrubias – professional soccer player
- Mike Davis – politician
- Grace-Ann Dinkins – Olympic 100m track runner, surgeon, philanthropist
- Jason Farol – singer, Duets
- Babatunde Fowler – politician
- Ryo Fujii
- David Garza
- Chase Gentry – professional soccer player
- Clarence Gilyard – actor, Matlock and Walker, Texas Ranger
- Faiivae Iuli Alex Godinet – politician
- Danny Grissett – musician
- Dan Guerrero – athletic director for the University of California, Los Angeles
- Michael Happoldt – musician, DJ, producer Sublime
- Sweet Alice Harris – community activist
- Kevin Hartman – Major League Soccer goalkeeper
- Robert Hecker – musician
- Hue Hollins – professional basketball referee
- Jerome Horton – California State Assemblyman for the 51st District
- Earl Ofari Hutchinson – author
- Carmelita Jeter – American sprinter; gold, silver and bronze medalist at 2012 Summer Olympics
- Kei Kamara – professional soccer player
- Brian Kehew – musician, The Moog Cookbook
- John Langley – producer, Cops
- Nativo Lopez – politician
- Yael Markovich – Israeli-American model and beauty queen/pageant titleholder (Miss Israel)
- Janelle McGee – professional soccer player
- Cora Martin-Moore – gospel singer
- Niecy Nash – actress, Reno 911!, Claws, dancer on Dancing with the Stars
- Josh Oppenheimer – Israeli-American professional basketball coach, and former professional basketball player
- Finbarr O'Neill – former CEO of J.D. Power, Mitsubishi Motors North America, and Hyundai Motor America
- Raymond F. Palmer – professor of biostatistics
- James Peoples – transportation economist and professor of economics
- Eric J. Perrodin – politician
- Christopher Phillips – academic
- Susan A. Phillips – professor of anthropology
- Kevin Pillar — Major League Baseball outfielder for the Los Angeles Dodgers
- Kyle Polak – professional soccer player
- Rex Richardson – politician
- Rodney Allen Rippy – actor
- Lela Rochon – actress, Harlem Nights, Why Do Fools Fall in Love
- Bubby Rossman ('14) – major league baseball pitcher for the Philadelphia Phillies
- Karen Sandler – author
- Gerald Schoenewolf – psychologist
- Doug Siebum – audio engineer
- Louis Silas – record executive, Silas Records
- Scott Shaw – author, martial artist, and filmmaker
- Jose Solache – California State Assemblyman from the 62nd district
- Chris Strait – comedian
- Ben Swann – television anchor
- Gabriela Soto Laveaga – historian of science specializing in Latin America at Harvard University.
- Chizuko Judy Sugita de Queiroz – artist
- Ben Swann – Emmy and Edward R. Murrow award-winning journalist
- Leo James Terrell – civil rights attorney and talk radio host
- John Tracy – aerospace executive, Senior Vice President of The Boeing Company (retired)
- Steffan Tubbs – journalist, two-time winner of the Edward R. Murrow award
- La Rue Washington, outfielder for the Texas Rangers in Major League Baseball
- Deb Vanasse – author
- Gyasi Zardes – Major League Soccer striker
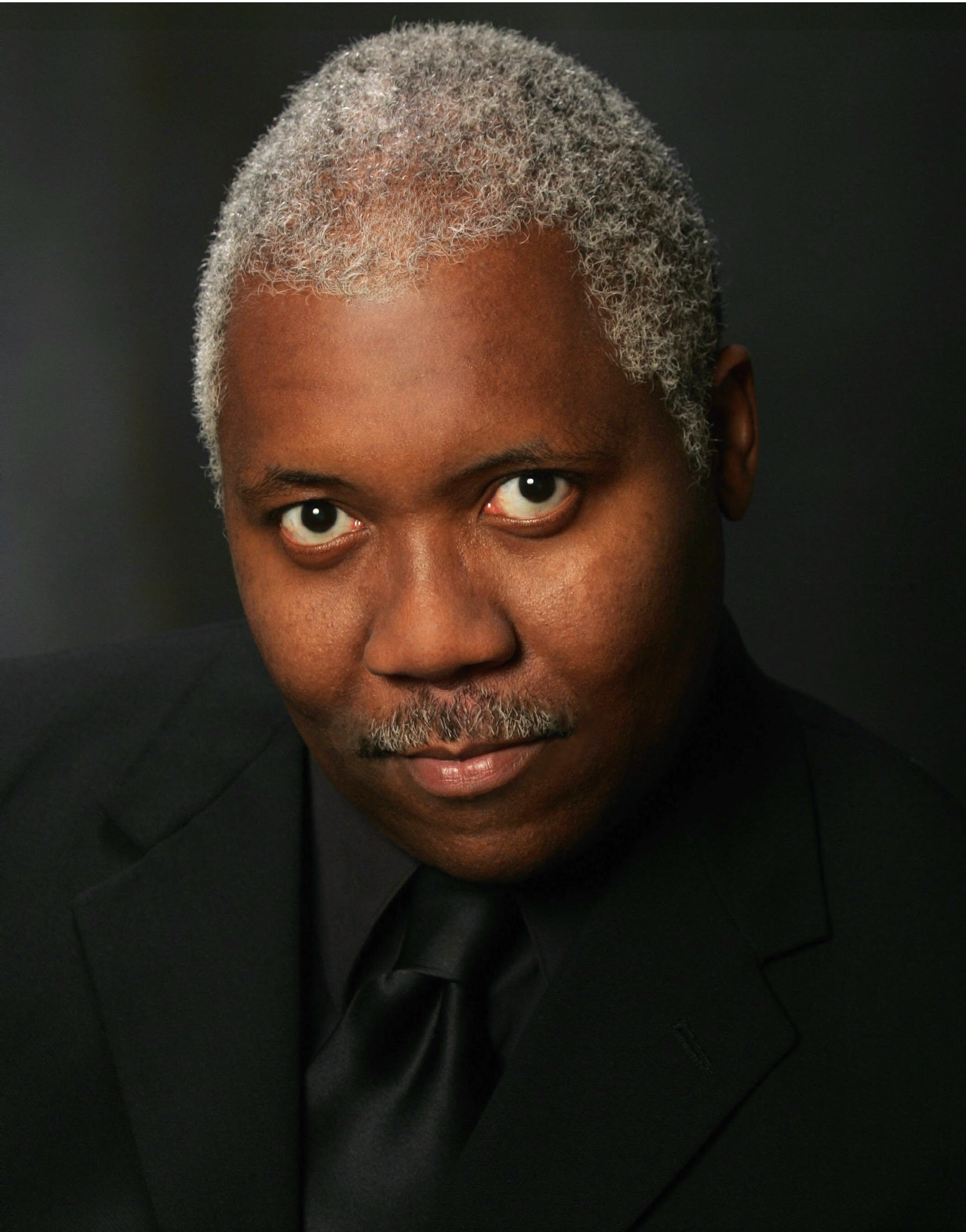
Jeff Coopwood

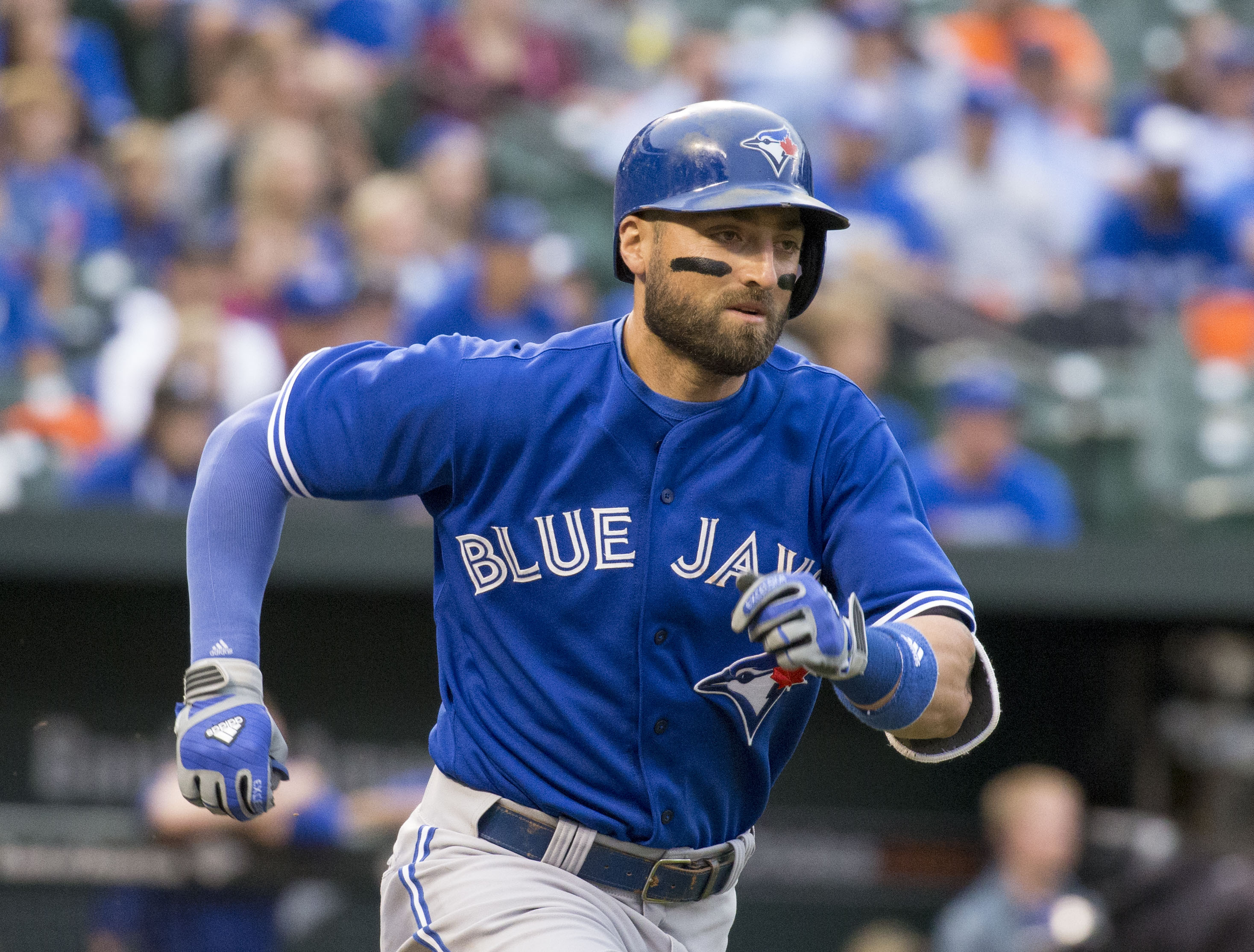
Kevin Pillar

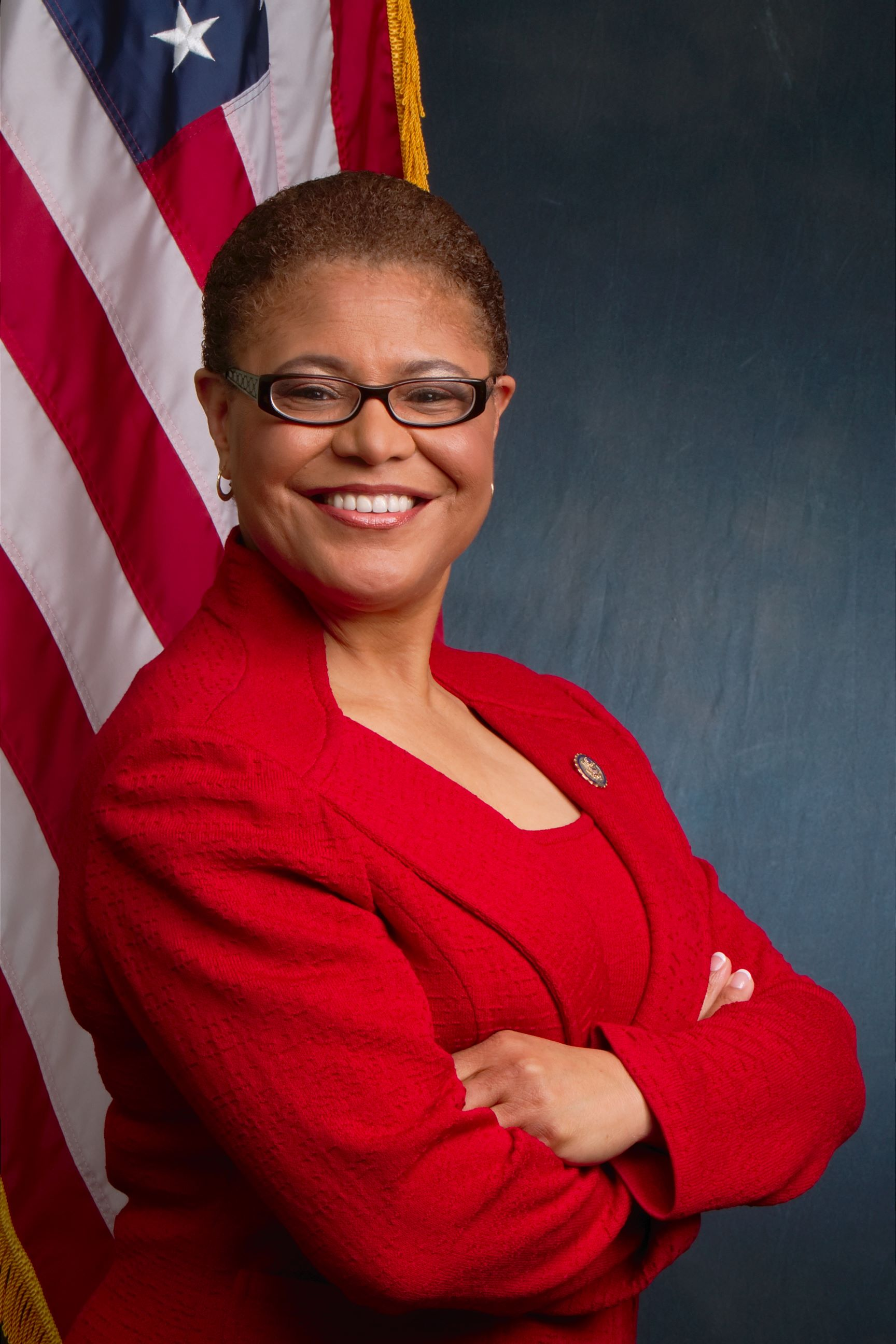
Karen Bass

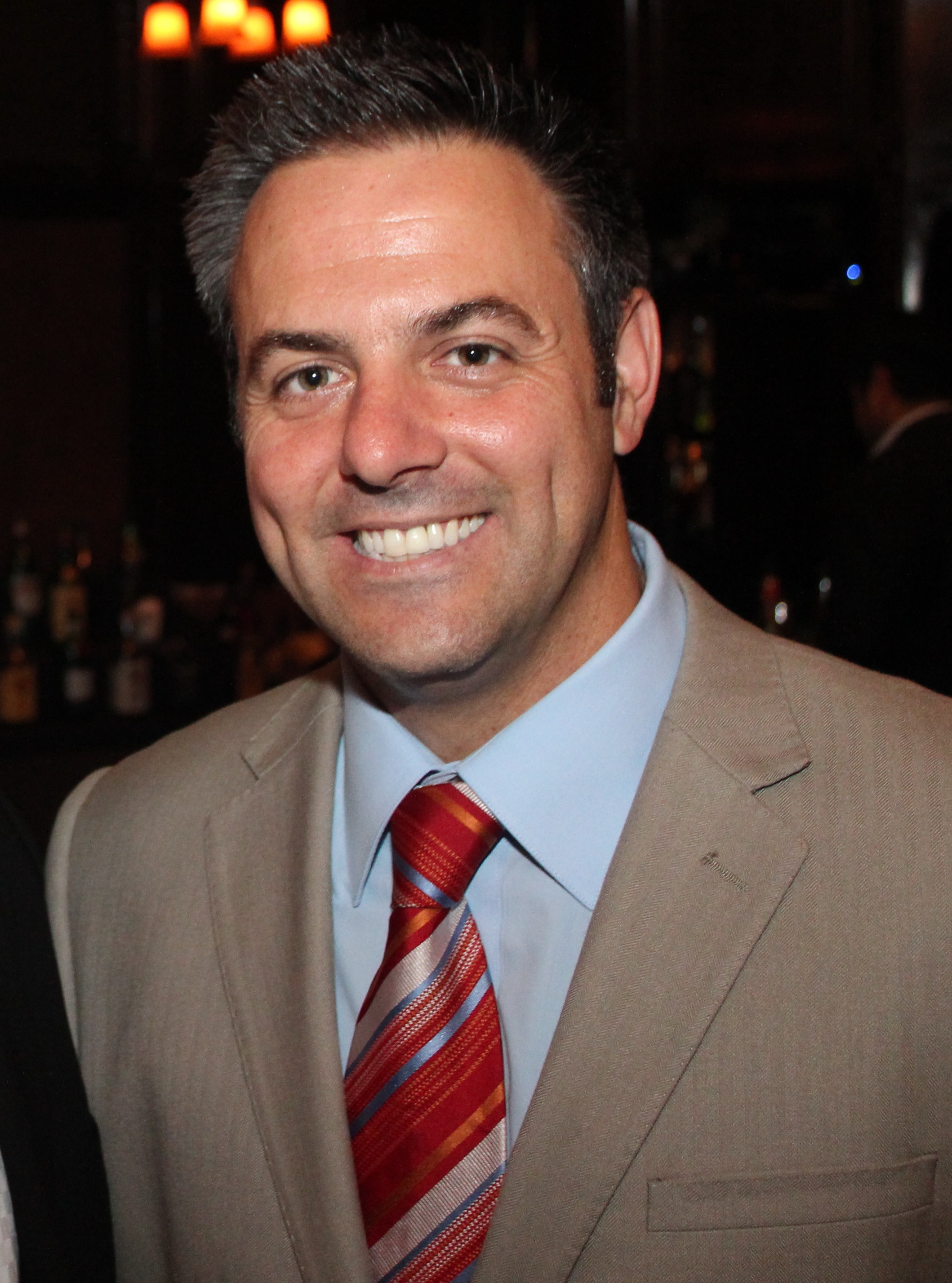
Joe Buscaino

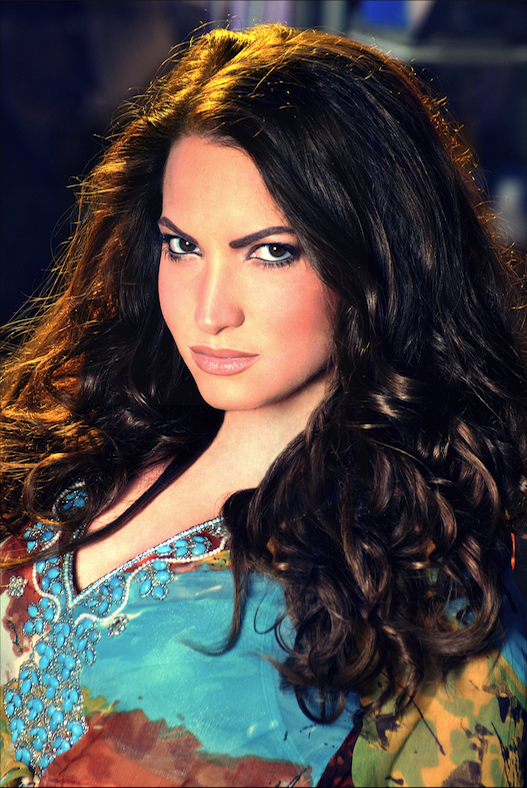
Yael Markovich

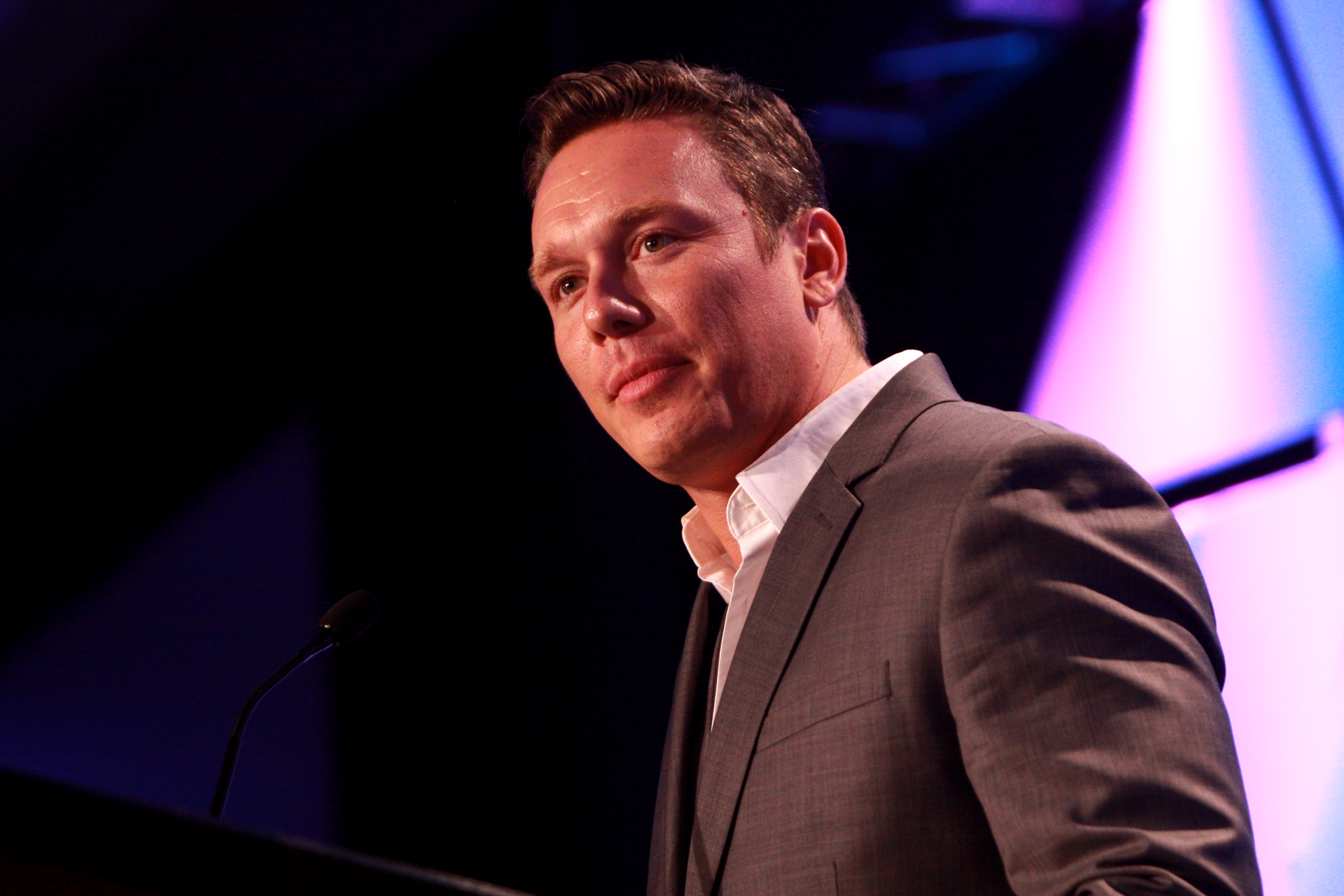
Ben Swann

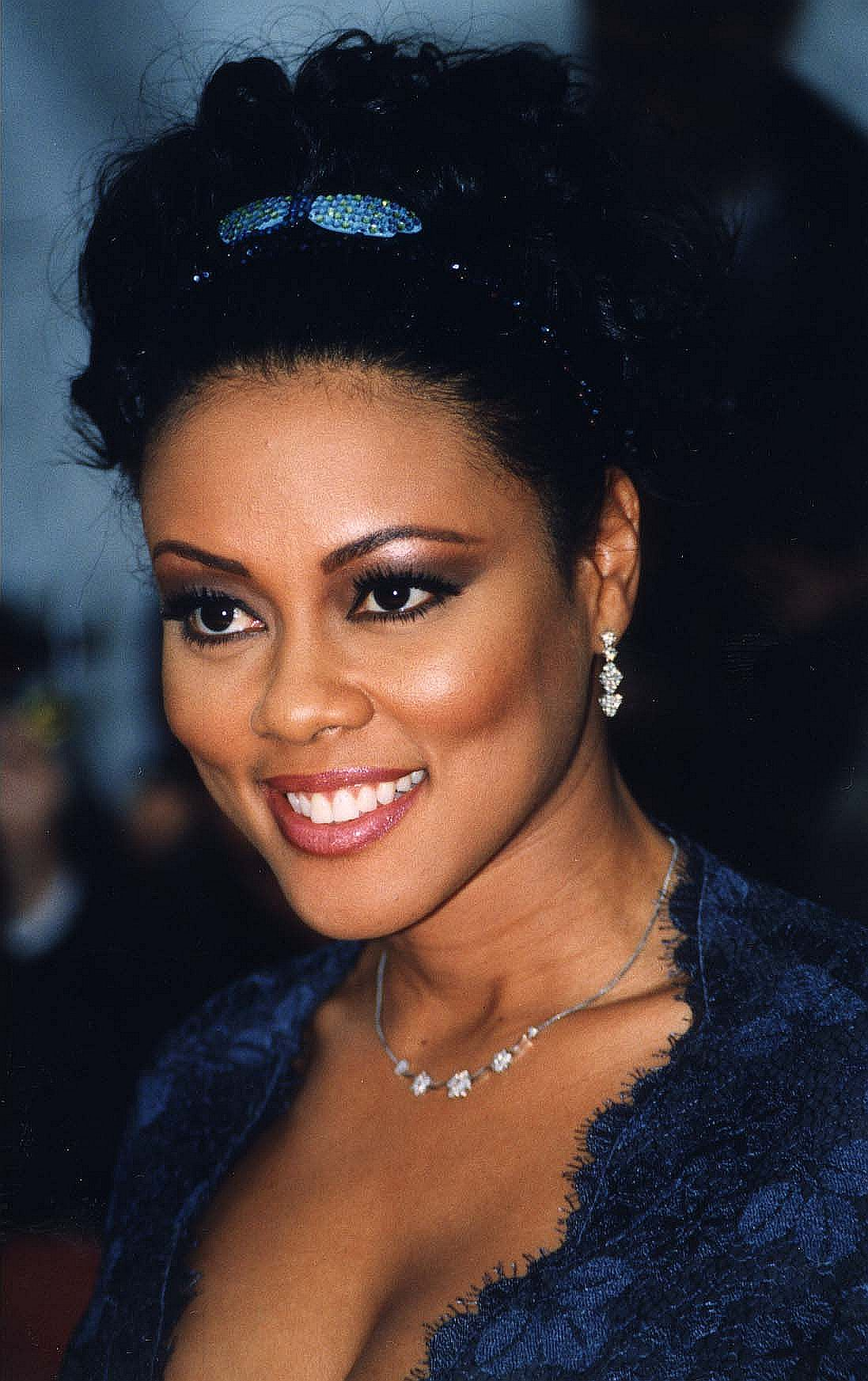
Lela Rochon

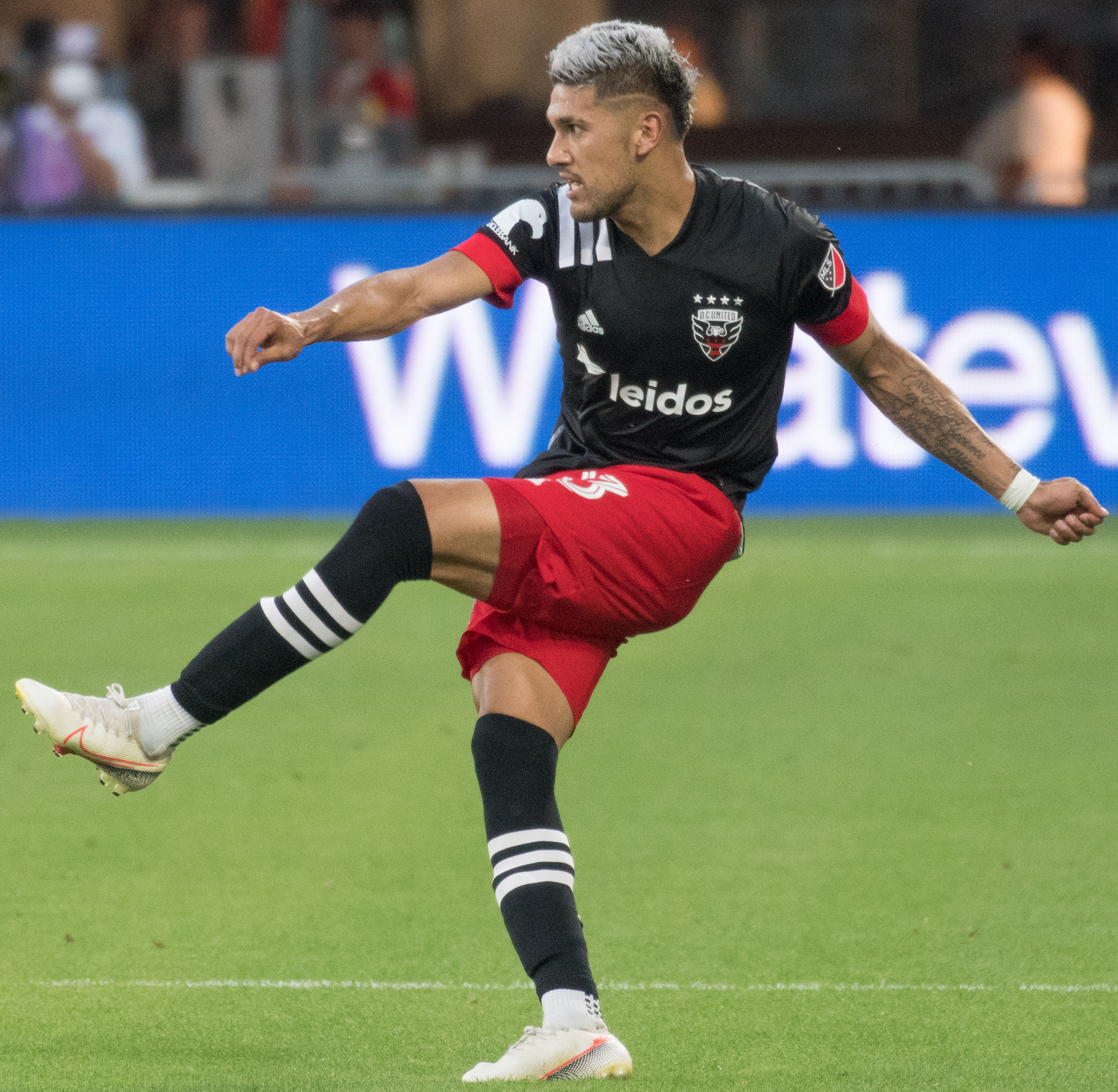
Tony Alfaro

=== Notable faculty ===
- Teodross Avery, Assistant Professor of Jazz Studies and Contemporary Music
- Nancy D. Erbe, Professor of Negotiation, Conflict Resolution & Peacebuilding
- Gilah Yelin Hirsch, Professor of Art
- C. Augustus Martin, Professor of Criminal Justice Administration, Director of School of Public Service and Justice
