= Mildred García =

American academic administrator

Mildred Garcia

9th Chancellor of the California State University System
- Incumbent
- Assumed office October 1, 2023
- Preceded by: Jolene Koester (acting)

5th President of California State University, Fullerton
- In office 2012–2018
- Preceded by: Milton Gordon
- Succeeded by: Fram Virjee

9th President of California State University, Dominguez Hills
- In office 2007–2012
- Preceded by: Boice Bowman
- Succeeded by: Willie J. Hagan

1st President of the Berkeley College System
- In office 2001–2007
- Preceded by: Position established
- Succeeded by: Rose Mary Healy

Personal details
- Education: New York City Community College (AS); Baruch College (BS); New York University (MA); Columbia University (MA, EdD)

Academic background
- Thesis: Community College Student Persistence: A Field Application of the Tinto Model (1987)
- Doctoral advisor: Robert Birnbaum

Academic work
- Discipline: Education
- Institutions: Arizona State University; Montclair State University; Pennsylvania State University; Teachers College, Columbia University; City University of New York; Berkeley College; California State University, Dominguez Hills; California State University, Fullerton

Mildred García is the current chancellor of the California State University system. She is also the former president of the American Association of State Colleges and Universities (AASCU) in Washington, D.C.

== Early life and education ==
García was born and raised in Brooklyn, New York. She is a first-generation college student.

García earned an A.A.S. from New York City Community College, a B.S. in Business Education from Baruch College, City University of New York, a M.A. in Business Education/Higher Education from New York University; an M.A. in Higher Education Administration from Teachers College, Columbia University; and a Doctor of Education degree, also from Columbia.

== Career ==
Garcia held academic positions at Arizona State University; Montclair State University; Pennsylvania State University; Teachers College, Columbia University; and at the Hostos, LaGuardia, and City Colleges of City University of New York.

García became the first system-wide president of Berkeley College in 2001 and served until 2007. From 2007 to 2012, García was president of CSU Dominguez Hills—the 11th female president and first Latina president in the California State University system. From 2012 to 2018, she held the post of president of CSU Fullerton.

García was the president of AASCU, a Washington, D.C.–based higher education association of 400 public colleges, universities, and systems from 2018 through 2023. She became chancellor of the California State University system on October 1, 2023.

=== Chancellorship (2023–present) ===
==== Executive compensation criticism ====
Upon García's appointment as chancellor in 2023, the CSU Board of Trustees approved a compensation package that included a base salary of $795,000, a $96,000 annual housing allowance, and $80,000 in deferred compensation. Coverage in CalMatters noted that executive and presidential salaries across the CSU system had grown substantially faster than those of faculty and lecturers in the decade preceding her appointment, contributing to criticism from some union leaders and students who contrasted rising executive compensation with tuition increases and ongoing financial pressures at the campus level.

==== 2024 faculty strike ====
In January 2024, the California Faculty Association staged a systemwide strike across all 23 CSU campuses over salary, workload, and benefits. As chancellor, García issued systemwide statements during the walkout and following the tentative agreement that ended it, emphasizing the need to balance faculty compensation with long-term fiscal sustainability. The strike ended after one day when the parties reached an agreement that included a 5% general salary increase—less than the 12% raise the union originally sought. Reporting by CalMatters, the Los Angeles Times, and the Associated Press noted that faculty leaders criticized system management for what they described as slow progress in meeting their demands, while CSU officials highlighted fiscal constraints and potential impacts of larger raises on student services.

==== Sonoma State governance issues ====
During the 2024–2025 academic year, Sonoma State University confronted a significant budget shortfall and announced plans to eliminate more than 20 academic programs. In April 2025, a Sonoma County Superior Court judge temporarily blocked the cuts, finding that campus leaders had not followed required procedures for program discontinuation or the appropriate role of the Academic Senate. The ruling drew increased attention to shared-governance practices at Sonoma State. Amid the turmoil, the Sonoma State Academic Senate approved a resolution calling for a referendum of no confidence in García and other administrators, citing concerns about financial decision-making and transparency.

==== Sonoma State protest agreement ====
In May 2024, Sonoma State president Ming-Tung “Mike” Lee issued an agreement with pro-Palestinian student protesters that included commitments such as suspending study-abroad programs involving Israeli institutions. The CSU Chancellor's Office stated that Lee had sent his message “without the appropriate approvals,” and García placed him on administrative leave, describing the action as an issue of shared governance and process. Lee announced his retirement the following day. Reporting in Inside Higher Ed and Higher Ed Dive noted that system leaders later walked back elements of the agreement.

==== Federal antisemitism investigation ====
In September 2025, García informed CSU employees that the U.S. Equal Employment Opportunity Commission had opened a systemwide investigation into allegations of antisemitism on CSU campuses. According to reporting by the Los Angeles Times and the San Francisco Chronicle, the complaint—filed under the Trump administration—led to subpoenas at multiple campuses, including a request at Cal State Los Angeles for employee contact information. Faculty unions expressed concern over privacy and academic freedom, while others argued that the probe reflected unresolved tensions over campus climate and political expression within the system.

== Awards ==
- Alfredo G. de los Santos Jr. Distinguished Leadership Award, American Association of Hispanics in Higher Education (AAHHE), 2019
