= Raymond F. Palmer =

American autism researcher

Raymond Francis Palmer
- Education: California State University, Long Beach; California State University, Dominguez Hills; University of Southern California
- Scientific career
- Fields: Family medicine, child psychiatry
- Workplaces: University of Texas Health Science Center at San Antonio
- Thesis: Cardiovascular reactivity as a moderator of the relation between cynical hostility and serum lipids : are there genetic influences? (1995)

Raymond F. Palmer is a tenured professor of family and community medicine at the University of Texas Health Science Center at San Antonio (UTHSCSA), who works on disease-related gene-environment interactions and disease prevention across the lifespan. As a biostatistician and epidemiologist, he uses longitudinal statistical methods to examine age-related cognitive changes, executive functioning, and physical decline. He has also studied connections between prenatal and early-life environmental factors and conditions such as autism and attention deficit hyperactivity disorder (ADHD). He has documented differences affecting Mexican Americans and non-Latino white populations in both children and the elderly.

== Education ==
Palmer has a bachelor's degree in psychology from California State University, Long Beach (1980), as well as an M.A. in psychology from California State University, Dominguez Hills (1985) and a PhD in preventive medicine from the University of Southern California (1995).

== Research ==
As a biostatistician and epidemiologist, Palmer uses longitudinal statistical methods to examine age-related cognitive and physical decline. He is particularly interested in children and the elderly,, populations that are believed to be at higher risk for cognitive impairment due to environmental exposures. He uses techniques such as latent class growth analysis (LCGA) to deal with missing information and heterogeneity in data dealing with age-related change.

=== Family medicine and aging ===
Palmer has been a member of Residency Research Network of Texas (RRNeT) Investigators group, an initiative formed in 1998 to increase faculty and residents' involvement in community research and study health issues related to family medicine in Texas. Palmer is a member of the Health & Aging Brain among Latino Elders (HABLE) Study Team, organized in 2017; was a principal investigator for the Hispanic Established Population for Epidemiological Study of the Elderly (HEPESE), which was conducted from 2010 to 2011; and was a core co-lead of The Health and Aging Brain Study (HABS-HD) Study Team, established in 2017. This work examines health disparities and risk factors related to brain aging and Alzheimer’s disease (AD) in populations including Mexican Americans and non-Latino whites.

=== Autism ===
In a 2004 study, Palmer et al. correlated Environmental Protection Agency data about the release of mercury (Hg) in 254 Texas counties with special education cases and autism diagnoses in the state's 1,200 school districts. In 2009, Palmer published results tracking industrial chemical releases in 1,040 Texas school districts and autism rates in nearby areas. For every 1000 pounds of mercury released by industry, he reported a 2.6% increase in autism rates. He also found a 3.7% increase in autism rates related to nearby power plant emissions. The study further showed that autism risk decreased when farther away from the source of mercury emissions. At a press conference, Palmer stated that "This is not a definitive study, but just one more that furthers the association between environmental mercury and autism." That there is a relationship between mercury and autism spectrum disorder (ASD) has since been supported by meta-analysis and review, indicating that increased Hg levels in individuals with ASD follow post-natal exposure to a polluted environment. This may be related to genetic differences and the impairment of the body's ability to excrete heavy metals such as mercury.

Palmer has also studied the differences in autism rates between Hispanic children and white children. In a 2009 study of data from 1,184 schools in 254 Texas counties, he concluded that Hispanic children are less likely to be diagnosed with the disorder than white children. He said that this difference is unlikely to be solely an artifact of socioeconomic factors. Subsequent researchers have shown differences in autism prevalence based on gender and location and changes over time. For the first time, in 2020, a study of autism in 8 year olds from 20 centers across the United States reported a lower prevalence of ASD among white children than among other racial and ethnic groups. This suggests a possible reversal of the direction of racial and ethnic differences in autism prevalence or rates of diagnosis compared to those observed by Palmer and others in the past.

In 2012, Palmer received a Suzanne and Bob Wright Trailblazer research award from Autism Speaks, to study baby teeth for environmental toxins that children could have been exposed to during the prenatal and early-life periods. As of 2026, the UT Health Science Center San Antonio continues to collect teeth for the ongoing “tooth fairy studies”. Old baby teeth from kids with and without autism are donated to the project, and examined using mass spectrometry to detect a history of the substances that children were exposed to as they grew. Sometimes DNA samples can be obtained from pulp in the teeth and used to examine interactions between genetics and chemical exposure. In an exploratory study published in 2024, Palmer reported a significantly higher concentration of chemicals in the teeth of children with ASD compared to children without ASD. The chemicals that were identified included phthalates, plasticizers, pesticides, antimicrobials, solvents, and fragrance additives.

== Awards ==
- 2017, STFM Best Research Paper Award, Society of Teachers of Family Medicine (STFM), co-author of “Practical Opportunities for Healthy Diet and Physical Activity: Relationship to Intentions, Behaviors, and Body Mass Index” (2016)

== Selected publications ==
=== Aging ===
- Espino, D. V.; Lichtenstein, M. J.; Palmer, R. F.; Hazuda, H. P. (May 2001). "Ethnic differences in mini-mental state examination (MMSE) scores: where you live makes a difference". Journal of the American Geriatrics Society. 49 (5): 538–548. doi:10.1046/j.1532-5415.2001.49111.x. PMID 11380745.
- Royall, Donald R.; Palmer, Raymond; Chiodo, Laura K.; Polk, Marsha J. (March 2004). "Declining executive control in normal aging predicts change in functional status: the Freedom House Study". Journal of the American Geriatrics Society. 52 (3): 346–352. doi:10.1111/j.1532-5415.2004.52104.x. PMID 14962147.
- Royall, Donald R.; Palmer, Raymond; Chiodo, Laura K.; Polk, Marsha J. (January 2005). "Executive control mediates memory's association with change in instrumental activities of daily living: the Freedom House Study". Journal of the American Geriatrics Society. 53 (1): 11–17. doi:10.1111/j.1532-5415.2005.53004.x. PMID 15667370.
- Royall, Donald R.; Palmer, Raymond; Chiodo, Laura K.; Polk, Marsha J. (November 2005). "Normal rates of cognitive change in successful aging: the freedom house study". Journal of the International Neuropsychological Society: JINS. 11 (7): 899–909. doi:10.1017/s135561770505109x. PMID 16519269.
- Palmer, Raymond F.; Royall, Donald R. (October 2010). "Missing data? Plan on it!". Journal of the American Geriatrics Society. 58 Suppl 2: S343–348. doi:10.1111/j.1532-5415.2010.03053.x. PMID 21029065.
- Salazar, Ricardo; Royall, Donald R.; Palmer, Raymond F. (March 2015). "Neuropsychiatric symptoms in community-dwelling Mexican-Americans: results from the Hispanic Established Population for Epidemiological Study of the Elderly (HEPESE) study". International Journal of Geriatric Psychiatry. 30 (3): 300–307. doi:10.1002/gps.4141. PMC 4898196. PMID 24838594.
- O'Bryant, Sid E.; Johnson, Leigh A.; Barber, Robert C.; Braskie, Meredith N.; Christian, Bradley; Hall, James R.; Hazra, Nalini; King, Kevin; Kothapalli, Deydeep; Large, Stephanie; Mason, David; Matsiyevskiy, Elizabeth; McColl, Roderick; Nandy, Rajesh; Palmer, Raymond; Petersen, Melissa; Philips, Nicole; Rissman, Robert A.; Shi, Yonggang; Toga, Arthur W.; Vintimilla, Raul; Vig, Rocky; Zhang, Fan; Yaffe, Kristine; HABLE Study Team (2021). "The Health & Aging Brain among Latino Elders (HABLE) study methods and participant characteristics". Alzheimer's & Dementia. 13 (1) e12202. doi:10.1002/dad2.12202. PMC 8215806. PMID 34189247.
- Royall, Donald R.; Palmer, Raymond F. (2023). "The effects of CNS atrophy and ICVD on tests of executive function and functional status are mediated by intelligence". Cerebral Circulation - Cognition and Behavior. 5 100184. doi:10.1016/j.cccb.2023.100184. PMC 10550593. PMID 37811522.
- Petersen, Melissa E.; Zhou, Zhengyang; Hall, James R.; Phillips, Nicole; Meeker, Karin L.; Borzage, Matthew T.; Braskie, Meredith N.; Clark, Alexandra L.; Shi, Yonggang; Rissman, Robert A.; Zhang, Fan; Vintimilla, Raul; Casas, Antonio; Rhodes, Jill; Barber, Robert C.; Johnson, Leigh; Yaffe, Kristine; Toga, Arthur W.; O'Bryant, Sid E.; HABS-HD Study Team (2025). "Health and Aging Brain Study-Health Disparities (HABS-HD) methods and partner characteristics". Alzheimer's & Dementia. 11 (3) e70140. doi:10.1002/trc2.70140. PMC 12340423. PMID 40799724.
- Petersen, Melissa E.; Zhang, Fan; Hall, James; Brock, Courtney; Rissman, Robert A.; Como, Tori; Julovich, David; Mapstone, Mark; Ances, Beau M.; Meeker, Karin; Palmer, Raymond; Barber, Robert; Mason, David; Johnson, Leigh; Yaffe, Kristine; Toga, Arthur W.; Cohen, Annie; O'Bryant, Sid E.; HABS-HD Study Team (2025). "Characterization of plasma AT(N) biomarkers among a racial and ethnically diverse community-based cohort: an HABS-HD study". Alzheimer's & Dementia. 11 (1) e70045. doi:10.1002/trc2.70045. PMC 11837735. PMID 39975470.

=== Patient care and outcomes ===
- Jaén, Carlos Roberto; Crabtree, Benjamin F.; Palmer, Raymond F.; Ferrer, Robert L.; Nutting, Paul A.; Miller, William L.; Stewart, Elizabeth E.; Wood, Robert; Davila, Marivel; Stange, Kurt C. (2010). "Methods for evaluating practice change toward a patient-centered medical home". Annals of Family Medicine. 8 Suppl 1 (Suppl 1): S9–20, S92. doi:10.1370/afm.1108. PMC 2885721. PMID 20530398.
- Parchman, Michael L.; Zeber, John E.; Palmer, Raymond F. (2010). "Participatory decision making, patient activation, medication adherence, and intermediate clinical outcomes in type 2 diabetes: a STARNet study". Annals of Family Medicine. 8 (5): 410–417. doi:10.1370/afm.1161. PMC 2939416. PMID 20843882.
- Jaén, Carlos Roberto; Ferrer, Robert L.; Miller, William L.; Palmer, Raymond F.; Wood, Robert; Davila, Marivel; Stewart, Elizabeth E.; Crabtree, Benjamin F.; Nutting, Paul A.; Stange, Kurt C. (2010). "Patient outcomes at 26 months in the patient-centered medical home National Demonstration Project". Annals of Family Medicine. 8 Suppl 1 (Suppl 1): S57–67, S92. doi:10.1370/afm.1121. PMC 2885729. PMID 20530395.
- Nutting, Paul A.; Crabtree, Benjamin F.; Stewart, Elizabeth E.; Miller, William L.; Palmer, Raymond F.; Stange, Kurt C.; Jaén, Carlos Roberto (2010). "Effect of facilitation on practice outcomes in the National Demonstration Project model of the patient-centered medical home". Annals of Family Medicine. 8 Suppl 1 (Suppl 1): S33–44, S92. doi:10.1370/afm.1119. PMC 2885723. PMID 20530393.
- Ferrer, Robert L.; Burge, Sandra K.; Palmer, Raymond F.; Cruz, Inez (March 2016). "Practical Opportunities for Healthy Diet and Physical Activity: Relationship to Intentions, Behaviors, and Body Mass Index". Annals of Family Medicine. 14 (2): 109–116. doi:10.1370/afm.1886. PMC 4781513. PMID 26951585.

=== Autism ===
- Palmer, R. F.; Blanchard, S.; Stein, Z.; Mandell, D.; Miller, C. (2006). "Environmental mercury release, special education rates, and autism disorder: An ecological study of Texas". Health & Place. 12 (2): 203–9. doi:10.1016/j.healthplace.2004.11.005. PMID 16338635.
- Palmer, Raymond F.; Blanchard, Stephen; Wood, Robert (March 2009). "Proximity to point sources of environmental mercury release as a predictor of autism prevalence". Health & Place. 15 (1): 18–24. Bibcode:2009HePla..15...18P. doi:10.1016/j.healthplace.2008.02.001. PMID 18353703.
- Palmer, R. F.; Walker, T.; Mandell, D.; Bayles, B.; Miller, C. S. (2010). "Explaining Low Rates of Autism Among Hispanic Schoolchildren in Texas". American Journal of Public Health. 100 (2): 270–272. doi:10.2105/AJPH.2008.150565. PMC 2804636. PMID 20019320.
- Curtin, Paul; Austin, Christine; Curtin, Austen; Gennings, Chris; Arora, Manish; (for the Emergent Dynamical Systems Group); Tammimies, Kristiina; Willfors, Charlotte; Berggren, Steve; Siper, Paige; Rai, Dheeraj; Meyering, Kristin; Kolevzon, Alexander; Mollon, Josephine; David, Anthony S.; Lewis, Glyn; Zammit, Stanley; Heilbrun, Lynne; Palmer, Raymond F.; Wright, Robert O.; Bölte, Sven; Reichenberg, Abraham (May 2018). "Dynamical features in fetal and postnatal zinc-copper metabolic cycles predict the emergence of autism spectrum disorder". Science Advances. 4 (5) eaat1293. Bibcode:2018SciA....4.1293C. doi:10.1126/sciadv.aat1293. PMC 5976276. PMID 29854952.
- Frye, Richard E.; Cakir, Janet; Rose, Shannon; Delhey, Leanna; Bennuri, Sirish C.; Tippett, Marie; Palmer, Raymond F.; Austin, Christine; Curtin, Paul; Arora, Manish (7 July 2020). "Early life metal exposure dysregulates cellular bioenergetics in children with regressive autism spectrum disorder". Translational Psychiatry. 10 (1): 223. doi:10.1038/s41398-020-00905-3. PMC 7341836. PMID 32636364.
- Frye, Richard E.; Cakir, Janet; Rose, Shannon; Delhey, Leanna; Bennuri, Sirish C.; Tippett, Marie; Melnyk, Stepan; James, S. Jill; Palmer, Raymond F.; Austin, Christine; Curtin, Paul; Arora, Manish (May 2021). "Prenatal air pollution influences neurodevelopment and behavior in autism spectrum disorder by modulating mitochondrial physiology". Molecular Psychiatry. 26 (5): 1561–1577. doi:10.1038/s41380-020-00885-2. PMC 8159748. PMID 32963337.

=== Chemical intolerance ===
- Katerndahl, David A.; Bell, Iris R.; Palmer, Raymond F.; Miller, Claudia S. (2012). "Chemical intolerance in primary care settings: prevalence, comorbidity, and outcomes". Annals of Family Medicine. 10 (4): 357–365. doi:10.1370/afm.1346. PMC 3392295. PMID 22778124.
- Palmer, RF; Almeida, M; Perales, RB; Rincon, R (July 2023). "A genome-wide SNP investigation of chemical intolerance". Environmental Advances. 12 100380. Bibcode:2023EnvAd..1200380P. doi:10.1016/j.envadv.2023.100380.
