= Gilah Yelin Hirsch =

Canadian artist

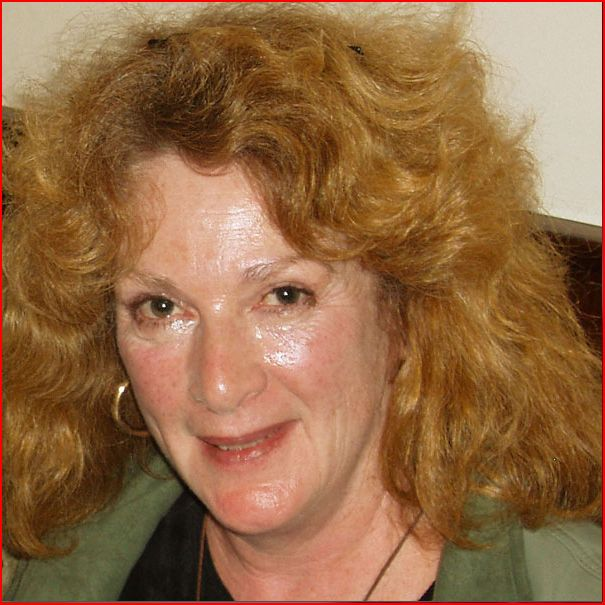
- Born: 1944 (age 81–82); Montreal, Quebec, Canada
- Education: UC Berkeley (BA), UCLA (MFA)
- Website: https://gilah.com/

Gilah Yelin Hirsch (born 1944) is a multidisciplinary artist who works as a painter, writer, curator, and filmmaker. Her work explores the connections between science, art, and spirituality. She has been a leader in the International Society for the Study of Subtle Energies and Energy Medicine (ISSSEEM). Hirsch was a founding member of one of the earliest women's art organizations, the Los Angeles Council of Women in the Arts (LACWA) and was active in the feminist art movement in Southern California. She was a professor of art at California State University, Dominguez Hills in Los Angeles since 1973 and became Professor Emerita in 2020. Presently, Hirsch continues painting, writing, theorizing, and filmmaking, and is often invited to present her work in conferences and webinars world-wide.

== Early life ==
Hirsch grew up in a Montreal Jewish community in the mid-1940s, reading and learning from the Torah in Hebrew and Yiddish at an early age. Her secular schooling was in English and French. While striving to learn about the world, Hirsch faced much emotional strife during her formative years because of her mother's mental illness and father's physical illness. To help her endure these physical and emotional assaults, Hirsch read "... the great philosophers, writers, early feminists, Freud and Jung, all included in the floor-to-ceiling library of [her] parents' small apartment."

Hirsch later published Demonic to Divine: The Double Life of Shulamis Yelin, a book that includes excerpts of her mother's diaries and some of her stories.

Hirsch earned a B.A. from the University of California, Berkeley in 1967, and an MFA in pictorial arts from UCLA in 1970. After graduating she taught at Santa Monica College and the University of Judaism, (now American Jewish University). Then in 1973, Hirsch joined the art department at California State University Dominguez Hills in Los Angeles, and obtained tenure in 1978. She is now Professor Emerita.

== Career ==
Hirsch was a founding member of the Los Angeles Council of Women Artists (LACWA) (1971), the "mother" organization of many subsequent feminist art organizations. She also named and facilitated the Joan of Art Seminars, (originated by June Wayne), teaching artists the business aspects of their professional careers. Since then (1972), this has become common practice and a regular component of art school curricula. Hirsch said, "Who knew that what we were doing would become historic and significant in the history of art? Prior to that, women did not exist in art."

In 1974, Hirsch brought the life and work of Canadian artist Emily Carr to the attention of the American academic community at the College Art Association, Washington, DC.

Hirsch curated the exhibition, Metamagic, in 1978 at the California State University Dominguez Hills University Art Gallery in Los Angeles. This exhibit was the first held nationally in a major exhibition space to be focused on the spiritual in art and attracted worldwide attention. In 2009, she coordinated Stepping into the Light, an exhibition of portraits by California State University Dominguez Hills art students of women who had been sexually assaulted; these works were exhibited in the Young Women's Christian Association (YWCA) in Carson. The exhibition was went on to show in New York, London, New Zealand, China, Mexico, and the Congo and other parts of Africa.

Hirsch spent the fall semester of 1979 as visiting artist at Saint Martin's School of Art, London, England. She introduced her painting and its related philosophical explorations at the Menninger Foundation's annual conference on consciousness in Council Grove, Kansas (1982). Hirsch has been a presenter for numerous Council Grove conferences (sponsored by the Menninger Foundation, Life Science Institute, Center for Ecology and Energy Medicine) and has convened two conferences (1995, 2006). In 1983, Hirsch first presented her theory on the origin of alphabet, Cosmography: The Writing of the Universe, at the Council Grove Conference.

In 1985, Hirsch received a senior artist grant from the National Endowment for the Arts, which – with a sabbatical from California State University – facilitated her year-long travel in Asia. In December 1986, she met Ngawangdanhup Narkyid (Kuno), the official biographer of the Dalai Lama in Dharamsala, India, initiating a friendship that would prove to be life-changing for the artist.

Among Hirsch's numerous exhibitions since 1968, she has shown at the Los Angeles County Museum of Art (LACMA) in California, the Whitney Museum of American Art in New York, Hebrew Union College in California, 2011 Vincent Gallery, Moscow, Russia, 2009 Symbol Galeria, Budapest (Hungary), 2007 Piano Nobile Gallery, Kraków (Poland), 2006 Soviart Gallery, Kyiv (Ukraine), 2006 Artoteka Gallery, Bratislava and 2005 Limes Galeria, Komarno (Slovakia), and the Jerusalem Biennale. Her archives are housed in the Smithsonian Archives of American Art.

Hirsch has also pursued an interest in architecture, and over a period of 35 years restored a 1900s duplex in Venice, California. Her house is featured in the 2010 book Cottages in the Sun: Bungalows of Venice, California.

== Films ==
Hirsch wrote and produced two documentary films, Cosmography: The Writing of the Universe (1995) and Reading the Landscape (2019), which was a Silver Winner at the International Independent Film Awards (Winter 2019).

== Books and publications ==
Hirsch authored three books to date and has been published in countless journals with various areas of focus. She connects them all to her artwork.

- The Traveling Exhibition, 2005 – 2009: Gilah Yelin Hirsch, (2010)
- Demonic to Divine (2015)
- Archaeology of Metaphor: The Art of Gilah Yelin Hirsch (2023)

== Presentions ==
Besides being a CSU Dominguez Hills Professor of Art Emerita (Department of Art & Design), Hirsch has given many lectures and presentations around the world.

== Significant events ==
- Los Angeles Council of Women Artists (LACWA), 1971.
- California State University Professor of Art & Design, 1973–2020.
- Inception of Cosmography (Resident Fellow of Dorland Mountain Colony, Temecula, CA), 1981.
- Theory of Cosmography Presentation (The Art of Gilah Yelin Hirsch, Menninger Foundation, Council Grove Conference, KS), 1982.
- The Alyce and Elmer Green Award, International Society for the Study of Subtle Energies & Energy Medicine, "for her innovative blending of science and art", 2010.
- Smithsonian Archives of American Art, Washington DC, 2017–present
