= La Rue Washington =

American baseball player (born 1953)

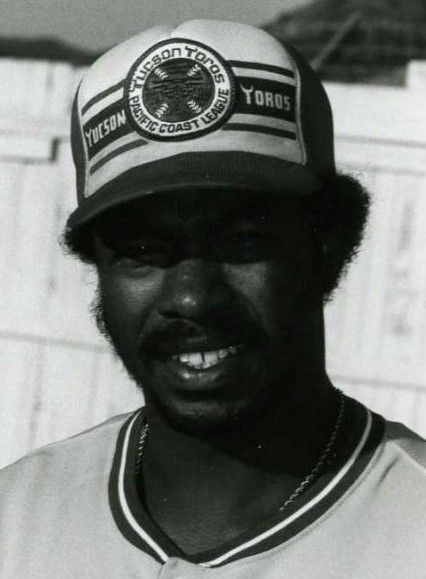
- Outfielder
- Born: September 7, 1953 (age 72); Long Beach, California, U.S.
- Batted: Right Threw: Right

MLB debut
- September 7, 1978, for the Texas Rangers

Last MLB appearance
- September 30, 1979, for the Texas Rangers

MLB statistics
- Batting average: .238
- Home runs: 0
- Runs batted in: 2
- Stats at Baseball Reference

Teams
- Texas Rangers (1978–1979)

La Rue Washington (born September 7, 1953) is a former outfielder in Major League Baseball who played for the Texas Rangers in 1978 and 1979. Listed at 6' 0", 170 lb., he batted and threw right-handed.

Born in Long Beach, California, Washington was selected by the Rangers in the 23rd round of the 1975 MLB draft out of California State University, Dominguez Hills.
