= Karen Sandler (author) =

- Born: Gardena, California, U.S.
- Occupations: Writer; software engineer; ghostwriter
- Writing career
- Period: 1990s–present
- Genres: Romance, science fiction, fantasy, horror, paranormal
- Website: karensandler.net

Karen Sandler (born in Gardena, California) is an American author of romance, young adult, science fiction, and mystery novels.

== Biography ==
Karen Sandler was born in Gardena, California to a Jewish family, the daughter Samuel Stier and Barbara Joan (Russo) Stier, and raised nearby, in Hawthorne. After receiving a B.A. in mathematics with a minor in physics in 1976 from California State University, Dominguez Hills, Sandler worked as a software engineer at Rockwell International in Downey, California on the Space Shuttle project. In 1978 she became a member of the technical staff at Hughes Aircraft Company, working with communications satellites. In 1979, she completed her M.S. in computer science at UCLA. She married her husband, Gary Sandler, in 1981, and later had two sons. The family moved from Southern to Northern California in 1993, at which time Sandler became a stay-at-home mom.

While raising her two boys, Sandler wrote in her spare time, completing three romance novels before selling her first (Just My Imagination) to Kensington Books. One of the pioneers of electronic publishing, Sandler saw her first electronic book, Eternity, published by Hard Shell Word Factory in 1998. She's a member of Authors Guild, the Society of Children's Book Writers and Illustrators.

== Bibliography ==
=== Young adult science fiction ===
- Tankborn (2011)
- Awakening (2013)
- Rebellion (2014)

Lee and Low/Tu Books

=== Middle grade time travel ===
- Time in a Bottle

Hard Shell Word Factory (e-Book, Trade Paperback, 2004)
Author edition (Timewrecked, e-book, 2012)

=== Adult mystery ===
- Clean Burn (Janelle Watson Mysteries)

Exhibit A Books (Trade Paperback, ebook, 2013)

=== Romantic comedy ===
- Just My Imagination

Kensington Publishing (Mass Market, 1998)
Thorndike Press (Large Print, 2002)
Hard Shell Word Factory (e-book, Trade Paperback, 2005)
Author edition (Loves Me, Loves Me Not, e-book, 2012)

- Table for Two

Kensington Publishing (Mass Market, 1998)
Thorndike Press & Chivers (Large Print, 2003)
Hard Shell Word Factory (e-book, Trade Paperback, 2005)
Author edition (His Make-Believe Wife, e-book, 2012)

- The Right Mr. Wrong

Hard Shell Word Factory (e-book, Trade Paperback, 2002)
Thorndike Press (Large Print, 2005)
Author edition (Blonde Luck, Love Be a Lady, e-book, 2012)

- Chocolate Magic

Five Star (Hardcover, 2004, Trade & Large Print 2005)
Awe-struck Books (e-book, 2005)
Author edition (Sweet Dream Lover, e-book, 2012)

=== Paranormal/science fiction romance ===
- Eternity

Hard Shell Word Factory (e-book, Trade Paperback, 2001)
Thorndike Press (Large Print, 2004)

- Unforgettable

Berkley Jove (Mass Market, 1999)
Ulverscroft (Large Print, 2006)
Author edition (The In-Between, Another Chance at Heaven e-book, 2012)

- Night Whispers

Berkley Jove (Mass Market, 1999)
Ulverscroft (Large Print, 2006)
Author Edition (Dark Whispers, e-book, 2012)

=== Silhouette special edition ===
- The Boss's Baby Bargain (2002)
- Counting on a Cowboy (2003)
- A Father's Sacrifice (2004)
- His Baby to Love (2005)
- The Three-Way Miracle (2006)
- Her Baby's Hero (2006)
- His Miracle Baby (2008)
- Her Miracle Man (2008)
- Their Second-Chance Child (2009)
- The Family He Wanted (2009)
