= Kyle Polak =

American soccer player and coach

Personal information
- Full name: Kyle Wilson Polak
- Date of birth: February 6, 1984 (age 42)
- Place of birth: Huntington Beach, California, U.S.
- Height: 6 ft 0 in (1.83 m)
- Position: Goalkeeper

Team information
- Current team: Cape Fear SC (Goalkeeper coach)

Youth career
- Wolfpack SC
- 1999–2003: Fountain Valley Barons
- 2002–2003: Cal State Fullerton Titans
- 2004–2006: Dominguez Hills Toros

Senior career*
Years	Team	Apps	(Gls)
2007	Chivas USA	0	(0)
2008–2009	Wilmington Hammerheads	4	(0)
2009–2011	Charleston Battery	0	(0)
2011–2012	Wilmington Hammerheads	10	(0)
2011	→ Charleston Battery (loan)	0	(0)

Managerial career
- 2008–2012: Wilmington Family YMCA (Athletic director)
- 2011–2012: Wilmington Hammerheads (Assistant coach)
- 2013–: Cape Fear SC (Goalkeeper coach)
- * Club domestic league appearances and goals

Kyle Polak (born February 6, 1984) is an American former soccer player, who is currently working as Goalkeeper coach by Cape Fear SC.

== Career ==
Polak started his active career in the Wolfpack Soccer Club in Fountain Valley, California. He played besides from 1999 to 2003 for the Barons, the Athletic team of the Fountain Valley High School. After his graduating signed for his studies by the California State University, Fullerton.

=== College ===
Polak played two years of college soccer at the California State University, Fullerton before transferring to California State University, Dominguez Hills as a junior. Polak holds the record for career wins (44) and career shut outs (24) at Dominguez Hills, and was named Male Athlete of the Year. Daktronics Men's Soccer far West 1st Team. NSCAA first team All-Region and First Team All-California Collegiate Athletic Association 2006.

Second-team all California Collegiate Athletic Association (2004–05) + First team all California Collegiate Athletic Association (2006). + Daktronics Men's Soccer Far West 1st-Team (2006) + NSCAA first team All-Region (2006)

=== Professional ===
After spending a year with Major League Soccer team Chivas USA's reserves in 2007, Polak signed with the Wilmington Hammerheads in the USL Second Division prior to the 2008 season. He didn't make any first team appearances for the Hammerheads in his rookie season, spending the entire year as backup to first choice keeper John O'Hara; he finally made his pro debut on July 2, 2009, in a 3–2 loss to Charlotte Eagles when Hammerheads #1 Daryl Sattler picked up an injury. He signed than September 3, 2009, for League rival Charleston Battery, who played because of injuries, never a game with the club.

On March 24, 2011, Polak signed for a second stint with Wilmington, now playing in the USL Pro league. He signed then a two-month loan contract with USL Pro League rival Charleston Battery, Polak played never a game for Battery and returned in summer 2011 to Wilmington. He played than the following two years in only ten games, before joined to Cape Fear SC.

== Coaching career ==
Polak began his working as Assistant athletic director by the Wilmington Family YMCA in North Carolina and worked for them until August 2011. In August his signing by Wilmington Hammerheads, was named as the club Assistant coach and worked in this position until December 2012. In December 2012 was named as Goalkeeper coach by the Cape Fear Soccer Club.

== Honors ==
Wilmington Hammerheads

- USL Second Division Regular Season Champions (1): 2009
