= John Tracy (aerospace executive) =

American chief technology officer (born 1954)

John J. Tracy (born 1954, in Los Angeles, California) is the retired chief technology officer (CTO) of The Boeing Company, the world's largest aerospace company. At Boeing, he held the dual roles of CTO and Senior Vice President of Engineering, Operations & Technology from June 2006 to mid 2016.

During his tenure as CTO, Tracy led Boeing's engineering team, which created noteworthy aerospace products including the Boeing 787 commercial airplane, the first jetliner to feature a composite fuselage; the Boeing 747-8 Intercontinental airplane, an updated version of Boeing's largest commercial airplane; the X-37, an experimental 30-foot unmanned space plane that's the first reusable spacecraft since the Space Shuttle; and Phantom Eye, a long-endurance, hydrogen-powered, 150-foot-long unmanned demonstrator aircraft.

== Early life ==
Tracy was born in Los Angeles, California, the second of two children. His father, John Wesley Tracy, worked in Human Resources at North American Aviation, which would later be acquired by Boeing. His mother, Victoria Alegria, was a homemaker. Tracy earned a bachelor's degree in physics from California State University-Dominguez Hills in 1976, a secondary school teaching credential from Chapman University in 1976, a master's degree in physics from California State University-Los Angeles in 1981, and a doctorate in engineering from the University of California-Irvine in 1987.

== Career ==
After spending three years as a high school physics and mathematics teacher in Los Angeles and two years as a physicist at Hercules Aerospace, Tracy joined McDonnell Douglas in 1981 as an engineer scientist. At that company he followed a path into management, which continued after the firm was acquired by Boeing in 1996. From 2004 to 2006 he served as the Vice President of Engineering for the company's Integrated Defense Systems business unit. In 2006 he was named the company's Chief Technology Officer and Senior Vice President of Engineering, Operations & Technology.

During his career, Tracy developed strong expertise in composites, aircraft structures and materials, composite structural mechanics, launch vehicle structures, smart structures, and aging aircraft. He has testified during hearings of committees in both the U.S. Senate and the U.S. House of Representatives on topics relating to the U.S. aerospace industry's ability to compete globally.

Tracy retired in July 2016, after the 100th anniversary of the founding of The Boeing Company.

== Executive roles at Boeing ==
2006-2016: Chief Technology Officer and Senior Vice President, Engineering, Operations & Technology

2004-2006: Vice President, Engineering, Integrated Defense Systems

2001-2004: Vice President, Structural Technologies, Prototyping, and Quality, Phantom Works

== Honors and awards ==
- Elected Member of the National Academy of Engineering (For leadership in advanced composites design and manufacturing technology for air and space vehicles.)(2013
- Honorary Fellow of the American Institute of Aeronautics and Astronautics (2016)
- International Von Karman Wings Award (2014)
- Honorary Fellow of the Royal Aeronautical Society
- Fellow of the Royal Aeronautical Society
- Fellow of the American Society of Mechanical Engineers (2004).
- Fellow of the American Institute of Aeronautics and Astronautics (2006)
- 2006, Great Minds in STEM: Hispanic Engineer of the Year. Honor recognizes overall leadership and technical or scientific achievement.
- 2009, Great Minds in STEM: Induction into the Hispanic Engineer National Achievement Awards Conference (HENAAC) Hall of Fame.
- 2014, Society of Hispanic Professional Engineers: Renaissance Engineer Award. Tracy became only the second individual ever to receive this award from SHPE since the organization's founding in 1974.
- 2016, Black Engineer of the Year Awards: Career Achievement Award.
- 2016, U.S. News & World Report: Induction into the publication's STEM Leadership Hall of Fame.
- 2016, Society for the Advancement of Material and Process Engineering (SAMPE): George Lubin Memorial Award.
