= Chase Gentry =

American soccer player (born 1997)

Personal information
- Date of birth: March 20, 1997 (age 29)
- Place of birth: West Covina, California, United States
- Height: 6 ft 1 in (1.85 m)
- Position: Goalkeeper

College career
Years	Team	Apps	(Gls)
2014–2017	Cal State Dominguez Hills Toros	65	(0)

Senior career*
Years	Team	Apps	(Gls)
2018	Tulsa Roughnecks	5	(0)
- * Club domestic league appearances and goals as of 17:47, 17 October 2018 (UTC)

Chase Gentry (born March 20, 1997) is an American soccer player who plays as a goalkeeper.

== Career ==
=== College ===
Gentry played four years of college soccer at California State University, Dominguez Hills between 2014 and 2017.

=== Professional ===
On February 6, 2018, Gentry signed for United Soccer League side Tulsa Roughnecks.
