= Willie J. Hagan =

American university administrator

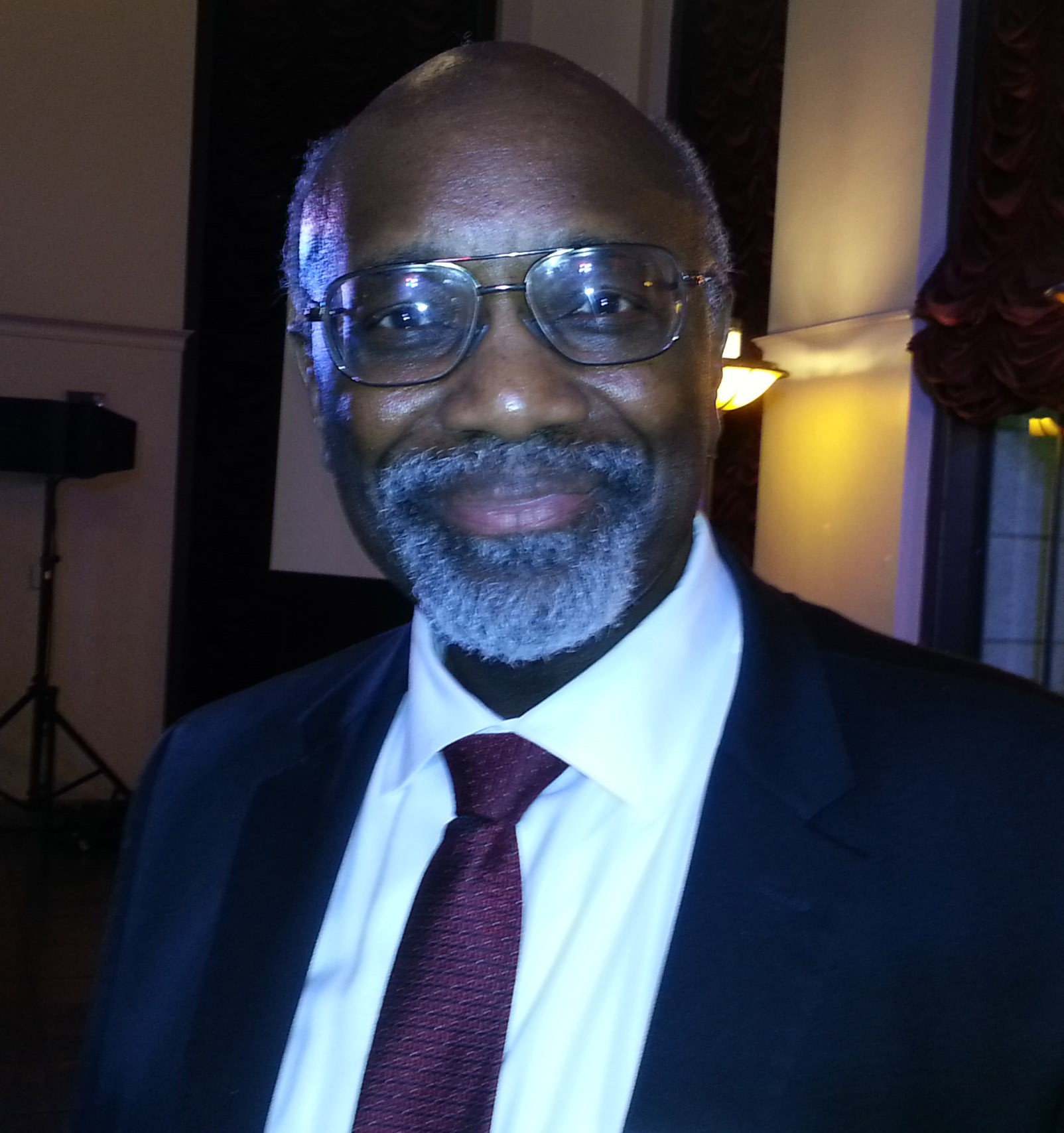
- Hagan in 2016

7th President of California State University, Dominguez Hills
- In office May 2, 2014 – June 30, 2018
- Succeeded by: Thomas A. Parham

Interim President of California State University, Dominguez Hills
- In office June 11, 2012 – May 1, 2014
- Preceded by: Mildred García

Interim President of California State University, Fullerton
- In office January 9, 2012 – June 10, 2012
- Preceded by: Milton A. Gordon
- Succeeded by: Mildred García

Personal details
- Education: University of Connecticut (PhD.); University of California Los Angeles (MFA)
- Profession: University president, educator

Academic background
- Thesis: Helplessness through modeling: The role of age and perceived similarity in competence (1994)
- Doctoral advisor: Reuben Baron

Academic work
- Discipline: Psychology
- Institutions: University of Connecticut; California State University, Fullerton; California State University, Dominguez Hills

Willie J. Hagan is an American educator and public university administrator. He was the 7th president of California State University, Dominguez Hills, a public university located in the city of Carson, California, in the South Bay region of Los Angeles County.

== Early life and education ==
During much of his youth, Hagan was predominantly raised by his mother, Dorothy Marie Hagan, while for six months a year, his father served in the United States Navy aboard a nuclear submarine, during the Cold War.

Hagan earned a Ph.D. in psychology, from the University of Connecticut, in 1994. His dissertation was called "Helplessness through modeling: The role of age and perceived similarity in competence." He also earned a Master of Fine Arts, in screenwriting, from the University of California Los Angeles, in 1998. While there, he wrote a screenplay called “Ayla,” in which the female protagonist leaves male-dominated Istanbul, for a new life in the United States.

== Career ==
From 1973 to 1996, Hagan also served at the University of Connecticut, which culminated in his term as associate vice president for administration. During his 23-year tenure, he also lobbied both federal and state governments on behalf of the university, as well as the Connecticut Board of Governors for Higher Education. He also led the United States' political delegations to London and Taiwan, as a member of the American Council of Young Political Leaders.

Having joined CSU Fullerton, in 1996, as vice president for administration and later as interim vice president for university advancement, he subsequently served as vice president for administration and finance and chief financial officer. On January 9, 2012, Hagan then began serving as interim president at California State University, Fullerton, upon the retirement of university president, Milton A. Gordon.

On June 11, 2012, Hagan began service as the interim president of CSU, Dominguez Hills.

In May 2013, he was named the permanent president and on May 2, 2014, he was inaugurated as the seventh president of the university. After five years, Hagan announced his retirement in 2017 for the next year.

== Tenure ==
Hagan has advanced the Male Success Alliance (MSA) program at CSU, Dominguez Hills. It is a nationally recognized program which targets the low graduation rates of African-American and Latino males from college and high school.

In addition, there are several college-bound initiatives which he promotes: the "Promise Program," where the university goes into middle and high schools and works with students to complete their academic requirements and gain admittance to the university; the "Summer Bridge Academy," which works with students who have academic deficiencies in their core courses; "Super Saturday," a day-long college fair for middle and high school students, parents, families and friends to learn about colleges, majors, programs and available resources; and "Super Sunday," another outreach program where the university goes into churches to bring the college fair experience directly to students and their families there.

On August 10, 2016, California Campus Compact announced that its executive board had selected Hagan, and University of San Diego president, James T. Harris III as new members. Their three-year terms, began retroactively, on July 1, 2016.

== Honors and awards ==
On February 3, 2016, Hagan was among those honored by the City of Los Angeles, with the Hall of Fame award. Hagan was the recipient of the award for “Outstanding Achievement in Education” for his role in “reinvigorating” CSU Dominguez Hills' mission for its students and communities it serves.

== Personal life ==
Hagan is married to his wife, Betty, who is a retired speech pathologist and special education teacher at Katella High School in the Anaheim Union High School District, after a career of over 35 years. He has a daughter, Lynea and two stepsons, Danny and Steven. Steven and his wife, Traci, have a daughter, his grandchild Katie.

Academic offices
Preceded by Mildred García	7th President of California State University, Dominguez Hills; May 2, 2014– current	Incumbent
Preceded by Mildred García	Interim President of California State University, Dominguez Hills; June 11, 2012 – May 1, 2014	Succeeded by Permanent
Preceded by Milton A. Gordon	Interim President of California State University, Fullerton; January 9, 2012 – June 10, 2012	Succeeded by Mildred García
