= Yael Markovich =

Israeli-American beauty queen and model

Yael Markovich יעל מרקוביץ
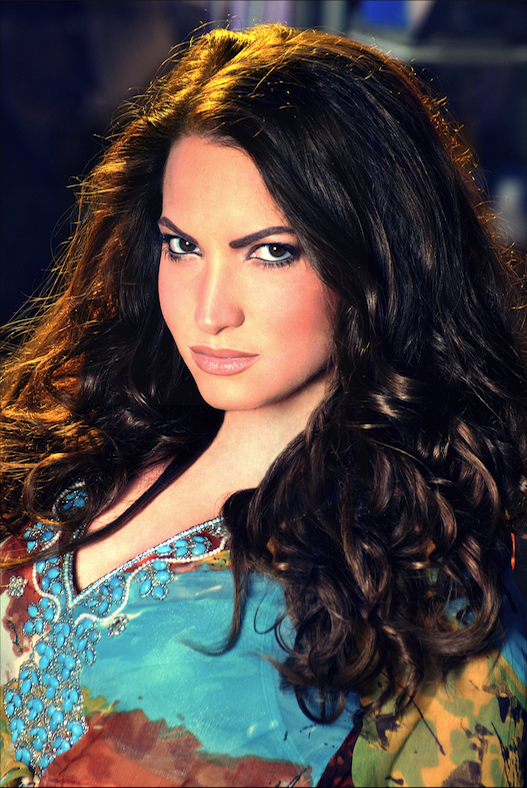
- Markovich in 2012
- Born: Yael Markovich; September 15, 1984 (age 42); Haifa, Israel
- Education: California State University Dominguez Hills (BSN); Santa Ana College (ADN/ASN)
- Occupations: Beauty Pageant Titleholder; Model; Registered Nurse
- Height: 5 ft 5 in (1.65 m)
- Beauty pageant titleholder
- Title: Miss Grand Israel 2013; Miss International Israel 2012; Miss Supranational Israel 2011
- Years active: 2005-present
- Hair color: Brown
- Eye color: Brown
- Major competitions: Miss Grand International 2013 (unplaced); Miss International 2012 (unplaced); Miss Supranational 2011 (unplaced)

Yael Markovich (Hebrew: יעל מרקוביץ, pronounced Ya-el born September 15, 1984 in Haifa, Israel) is an Israeli-American model and beauty pageant titleholder. Markovich is the only Miss Israel who represented her country in three worldwide beauty pageants.

== Early life ==
Markovich was born in Haifa, Israel. Markovich is Jewish, attended a Jewish day school and had a Bat Mitzvah.

== Career ==
=== Modeling ===
Markovich has been featured on websites such as Maxim, AskMen, IGN, and Playboy's The Smoking Jacket. In addition, Markovich has graced the covers of Venus Says Magazine, the December 2012/January 2013 issue of The Jewish Journal's sister publication TRIBE magazine; cover of Israeli Week Newspaper the week of 6 February 2013 – 12 February 2013, the February 2013/March 2013 issue of 303 Magazine, a Denver, Colorado based fashion magazine, and the cover page of Israeli national newspaper Yediot Achronot (Ynet America). In early 2013, Yael was invited by Playboy Israel to pose for Playmate of the Month for the month of September. Due to lack of funding, the publisher declared bankruptcy before they were able to publish her non-nude pictorial. The Israeli Post featured an article about Yael and the CEO of Playboy Israel in August 2013.

== Pageants ==
=== Miss Supranational Israel 2011 ===
Markovich was crowned Miss Supranational Israel 2011, and went on to represent her country in the 3rd annual Miss Supranational pageant held in Plock, Poland, on 26 August 2011. She holds the title for being the first Miss Supranational Israel.

=== Miss International Israel 2012 ===
Markovich was crowned Miss International Israel 2012. After 7 years of absence, Israel made its debut at the Miss International 2012 pageant. Markovich represented Israel in the 52nd Miss International pageant on 21 October 2012 in Okinawa, Japan.

=== Miss Grand International Israel 2013 ===
Markovich was crowned Miss Grand International Israel 2013 and would have represented her country in the 1st annual Miss Grand International pageant on 19 November 2013 in Bangkok, Thailand. However, the modeling agency that represents Markovich, withdrew her from the competition for lack of agreement between the organizers and the modeling agency. Even though she did not compete, she still holds the title for being the first Miss Grand International Israel.

== Controversy ==
On 26 March 2013 controversy was stirred when Markovich published her negative experience with the Miss Supranational Organization and her visit to Poland, on a pageant website. The article made headlines in Israel and had attracted dozens of Israeli national media outlets, such as Ynet.co.il and Shavua Israeli (Israeli Week), that shared Markovich's experience by publishing a more detailed interview in Hebrew. On 29 March 2013 Miss Supranational Organization rebutted, by posting on their Facebook page a response to the allegations.

== Personal life ==
She has Syrian, Turkish, and Polish ancestry.

Markovich owned a day spa in Beverly Hills, California. In November 2014, Yael announced on social media that she had sold her salon.

Yael founded the Miss Israel Organization. The Miss Israel Organization holds the franchises for Miss International Israel and Miss Grand Israel.
