= Edvard Fallesen =

Danish military personnel (1817–1894)

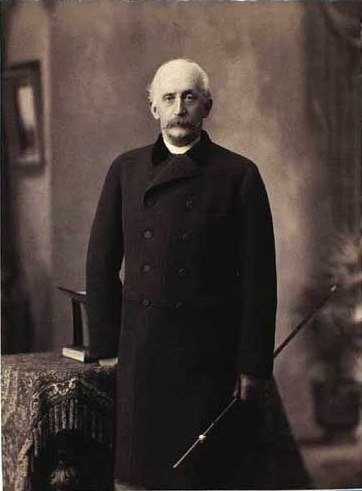
- Born: Morten Edvard Fallesen; 29 January 1817; Copenhagen, Denmark
- Died: 6 July 1894 (aged 77); Ville d'Avray, France
- Occupations: military officer; politician; theatre manager

Morten Edvard Fallesen (29 January 1817 – 6 July 1894) was a Danish army officer, politician and theatre manager. He fought in the First and Second Schleswig War and served as a member of both the upper and lower houses of the Danish Parliament. From 1876 until his death at the age of 77, he was the General Director of the Royal Danish Theatre. Fallesen was appointed Chamberlain to King Christian IX in 1872 and awarded the Order of the Dannebrog in 1876.

== Life and career ==
Fallesen was born in Copenhagen, the son of Lorentz Nikolai Fallesen, a Protestant clergyman and theologian. He studied at the University of Copenhagen and then at the Royal Military College. After receiving his commission as a First Lieutenant in 1846, he was appointed to the artillery corps of the Danish Army. Fallesen served in both the First and Second Schleswig War, eventually rising to the rank of Captain and serving as a member of the international commission that formulated the 1864 Treaty of Vienna. However, his health had suffered during the second Schleswig campaign, and he retired from active combat duty in 1865. His final military appointment was as Colonel of the Bornholm Regiment in 1866.

Fallesen had been active in politics from 1858 when he became the member for Assens in the Folketing (at the time the lower house of the Danish Parliament). He held the seat until 1866. From 1874 until 1882 he served as the member for Bornholm in the Landsting (upper house of the Danish Parliament). Known for the eloquence of his debating style, he was essentially independent but on major issues voted with the conservative Højre Party.

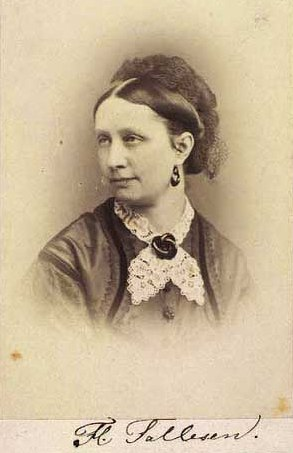
Danish actress Flora Falleson (1832–1900), Falleson's second wife

In 1876 Fallesen was awarded the Order of the Dannebrog and in July of that year was appointed head of the Royal Danish Theatre, a position he held until his death in 1894. Although considered an unlikely choice for the post, his stewardship was credited with reinvigorating the company, reform of its practices and repertoire, and improvement in working conditions for its actors and staff. According to theatre historian Laurence Senelick, his management style had benefited from his experience and skills as a politician and his close personal ties to King Christian IX to whom he had been appointed Chamberlain in 1872.

Falleson was married twice. His first marriage in 1851 to Pouline Funck (1825–1879) was dissolved in 1858. She was a ballet dancer who had made her debut in the corps de ballet of the Royal Danish Theatre in 1840 and her debut as a soloist in 1848. Her mother, Wilhelmine Rosine Funck, was an opera singer at the theatre, and her father, Poul Funck, was a ballet dancer and noted choreographer. Falleson's second wife was the actress Amanda Flora Mathilde née Thomsen whom he married in 1865. The daughter of Ove Thomsen, a Danish journalist and politician, she had made her debut at the Royal Danish Theatre in 1857 as Madame Renaud in Husholdningspolitik (Household Diplomacy) and for several seasons acted at the Casino theatre in Copenhagen.

Edvard Fallesen died at the age of 77 after having been taken ill in Ville d'Avray, France where he had been on holiday. He is buried in the Solbjerg Parkkirkegård cemetery in Frederiksberg.
