= Servage Hosting =

Servage GmbH
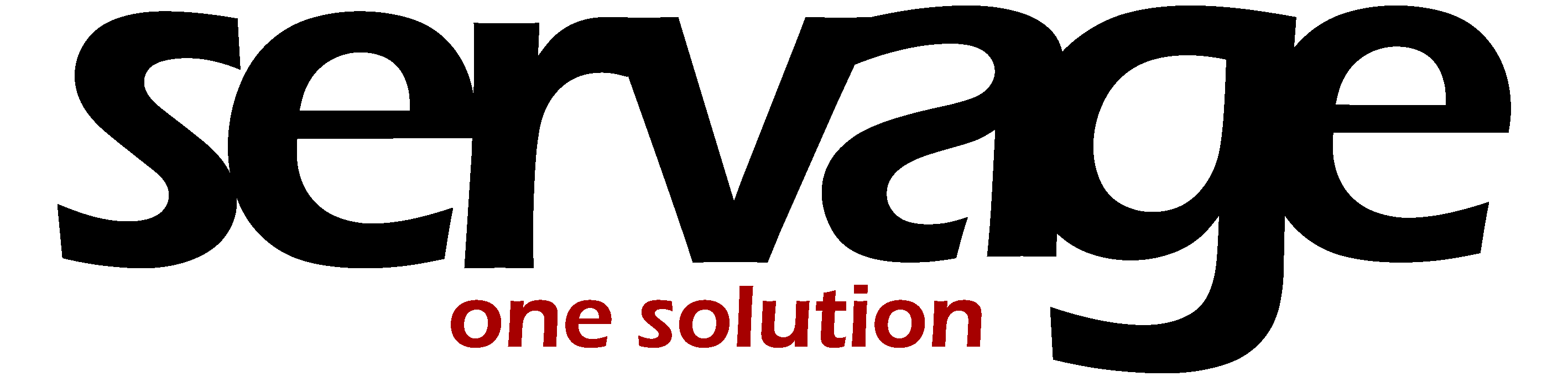
- Servage One Solution Logo
- Type: Private company
- Industry: Web hosting service
- Founded: Germany 2004
- Founder: Steffan Sondermark Fallesen
- Headquarters: Neustadt 16, Flensburg, Germany
- Key people: Ari Liukko (CEO)
- Products: Web services
- Website: servage.net

Servage GmbH is a German web hosting provider headquartered in Flensburg, Germany. The company is doing business as Servage Hosting. The company is a subsidiary to the Swedish company Servage AB (publ). The corporate name Servage is an offspring of "Serve" and "Age". As such, the name equates to the company's branding toward modern service.

== Early years ==
The company was incorporated in 2004 by Steffan Sondermark Fallesen and later sold to the publicly listed Swedish telecommunication firm Tele5 Voice Services AB for $3.5 million cash in May 2007 and left the company in October 2009. In 2008 Tele5 Voice Services AB changed its name to Servage AB as chairman of the Tele5 Voice Services AB board Per Bergström felt that Servage was a better suited brand name for an international corporation.

During the first three years the company operated only an English version but in recent years German, Polish, Danish and Swedish versions are also offered. Company is now among the 20 largest German web hosts.

== Criticism ==
Servage has been criticized for overselling its services in order to keep up with competition in recent years. There have also been large numbers of Servage customers reporting that their sites have been repeatedly hacked, resulting in malicious code being inserted into their web-pages. Servage claims that the issue is resolved by their new server operating system ServageOS.

Servage has also used the term "WebDrive" which is a registered trademark of South River Technologies

== Network ==
Servage is operating network AS 29671 which interconnects to Versatel, TeliaSonera, Tiscali and Cogent Communications.

In an attempt to become fully open source powered Servage changed its entire network infrastructure to the open-source routing platform GNU Zebra in 2007. Prior to the change Servage had been using Cisco routers.

As of 28 April 2010, mass hacking of Servage hosted sites identified by url=http://blog.unmaskparasites.com/2010/04/28/hackers-abuse-servage-hosting-to-poison-google-image-search/. Hackers hotlink images scraped from google image search on hundreds of hacked Servage domains, then manage to take the place of the original host domain in the google image SERPs. When a surfer clicks the hijacked image, traffic from google is redirected to malware site.

== ServageOS ==
October 21, 2008 the company released a new customized Linux version (ServageOS) for use on its server clusters. Most notable features is full process separation between customers and other similar security enhancements suitable for hosting environments.

== Servage Control Panel ==
Servage has an in-house developed Control Panel, some of the functions found inside the Control Panel are mentioned below.

- E-Mail Management

- Optional Antispam System

- Autoinstaller

- FTP Management

- Online Filemanager

- WebDrive

- Full DNS Control

- Integrated Accounting

- Help Center

== Award Nominations ==
- 2010 XBIZ Award Nominee: Web Host of the Year

== Additional information ==
=== Servage Magazine ===
Servage runs a blog, or as it is called Servage Magazine which offers tips for web hosting customers regardless if they have a Servage Hosting accounts or not, the blog is interactive and allows for comments from the readers. The blog is updated regularly and the feed is also available at Servage's page on Facebook.

=== Servage Wiki ===
Along with the blog/magazine, Servage also provides an online knowledge base in Wiki-form, Servage Wiki, with information about an account with Servage. Being a Wiki it is encouraging contribution by anyone possessing relevant knowledge on a subject.
