= Steffan Tubbs =

Steffan Tubbs is a former radio host on Denver, Colorado's News/Talk 710 KNUS. He used to host "The Steffan Tubbs Show" on News/Talk 710 KNUS weekday afternoons from 3pMT - 7pMT M-F, which ended in November 2023, per an announcement made by him on the show's Facebook page in August 2023. He was the host of Colorado's Morning News and on 850 KOA having begun his radio career at the station in 1994. His voice was a continued presence during a six-year career with ABC News; he was a national radio anchor for the service on the evening of September 11, 2001. He returned to the Denver market after reporting and anchoring for WNYW Fox5-TV, the Fox affiliate in New York City.

In 2006, Tubbs founded Mountain Time Media www.mountaintm.com

In April 2025, Tubbs was quoted as a spokesman for the Drug Enforcement Administration's Rocky Mountain Division.

He is the author of two books:

▪ "They Said. They Said." - which examines the 2019 death of Kate Rafferty Petrocco in Adams County, Colorado.

▪"Life, Liberty & Resilience" - a look at a segregated World War II veteran from rural Mississippi.

The documentary film "Life, Liberty & Resilience" won the San Luis Obispo International Film Festival's Audience Choice Award in March 2014. The film was also shown at the Boston Film Festival, St. Louis Film Festival, Tupelo Film Festival, Black Hills Film Festival, the Unspoken Film Festival and the Crossroads Film Festival.

Tubbs' documentary films released through Mountain Time Media include:

▪ "Droughtland" (2014)

▪ "ACRONYM: The Cross-Generational Battle With PTSD" (2015)

▪ "25 Steps" (2018) narrated by Peter Coyote. Winner, Best Documentary Short, Glendale (CA) International Film Festival

▪ "Ethan's Reach" (2020)

▪ "Denver in Decay (2020)

Tubbs received his undergraduate degree in Journalism at California Polytechnic State University, San Luis Obispo and received his Masters with the external Master of Arts in Humanities/History program at California State University, Dominguez Hills in 2010.

Tubbs is a four-time winner of the Edward R. Morrow Award and has been embedded twice with U.S. troops in Iraq (2006 & 2010.)

Tubbs' trademark close to his program: "Remember Our Troops." He hosts the weekly program "The American Veteran Show" on 710 KNUS Sundays at NOON MT. The program began in 2016. www.americanveteranshow.com
