= Steffan Sondermark Fallesen =

Danish businessman

- Born: 7 May 1981 (age 45); Vejen, Denmark
- Occupation: Investor
- Spouse: Patricia Søndermark
- Website: Steffan Sondermark Fallesen

Steffan Søndermark Fallesen (born 1981) is an Internet entrepreneur. He founded Servage Hosting (one of Germany's largest hosting companies) immediately after moving to Flensburg. He sold Servage Hosting to the Swedish firm Tele5 Voice Services AB in May 2007 and left the company in October 2009. His recent activity has been in investment banking and company development through his holding company Sondermark Holding GmbH.

During his teenage years he built a portfolio of websites in his native language, such as popular chat sites and a free email service similar to Hotmail. For years these properties were hugely popular and among the most visited sites in Denmark.

After identifying problems with the Java implementation in Microsoft Windows, by exploiting these erroneous implementations he was able to identify cyber criminals, even while using proxy servers. This system is known to have been actively used by the Danish Security and Intelligence Service (PET) and likely other entities.
