= Servage AB =

Servage AB (publ)
- Company type: Public company
- Industry: Cloud Services, Outsourcing
- Founded: Sweden
- Founder: Ari Liukko
- Headquarters: Norra Stationsgatan 93, 113 64 Stockholm, Sweden
- Key people: Ari Liukko (CEO), Per Bergström (COB), Maria Myräng (CFO), Sten Hubendick (CTO)
- Products: Cloud services, Dedicated Services
- Website: http://www.servagegroup.se

Servage AB (publ) is a Swedish cloud service provider headquartered in Stockholm, Sweden. The company is the parent company of Levonline, Servage Communication and Servage Hosting. The corporate name Servage resulted from the words: "Serve" and "Age", that when combined (almost) spells out the company name. The name relates to the company's ambition to serve its customers while always keeping the systems up-to-date with the most modern technologies.

== Servage GmbH / Tele5 Voice Services AB Merger & Name Change ==
In 2007 Servage Hosting became a fully owned subsidiary of Tele5 Voice Services AB, and in 2008 Tele5 Voice Services AB changed its name to Servage AB. The chairman of the Tele5 Voice Services AB board Per Bergström felt that Servage was a better suited brand name for an international corporation.
