= Treisman =

Treisman is a surname. Notable persons with that name include:

- Anne Treisman (1935–2018), British psychologist
- Daniel Treisman (b. 1964), British-American political scientist
- David Treisman, known as David Caminer (1915–2008), British electronic systems analyst
- Philip Treisman, American mathematician
- Sir Richard Henry Treisman, Fellow of the Royal Society, see list of Fellows

== See also ==
- David Triesman, Baron Triesman, Labour member of the House of Lords
