= California Historical Landmarks in Los Angeles County =

List table of the properties and districts listed on the California Historical Landmarks in Los Angeles County, Southern California.

- Note: Click the "Map of all coordinates" link to the right to view a Google map of all properties and districts with latitude and longitude coordinates in the table below.

Image		Landmark name	Location	City or town	Summary
Adamson House	966	Adamson House	Adamson House; 34°02′04″N 118°40′51″W	Malibu	23200 Pacific Coast Hwy, Malibu, CA
Adobe de Palomares	372	Adobe de Palomares	491 East Arrow Highway; 34°05′26″N 117°44′35″W	Pomona	
Angeles National Forest	717	Angeles National Forest	Angeles National Forest; 34°16′11″N 118°10′06″W	multiple cities	
Avila Adobe	145	Avila Adobe	El Pueblo de Los Angeles Historic Monument; 34°03′26″N 118°14′16″W	Los Angeles	Also on the NRHP list as NPS-72000231
Banning Park	147	Banning Park	401 East M St. 33°47′23″N 118°15′32″W	Wilmington	
Beach Boys Historic Landmark	1041	Beach Boys Historic Landmark	3701 W. 119th St. 33°55′31″N 118°20′15″W	Hawthorne	
Beale's Cut Stagecoach Pass	1006	Beale's Cut Stagecoach Pass	Sierra Hwy and Clampitt Rd. 34°20′32″N 118°30′34″W	Santa Clarita	
Bella Union Hotel site	656	Bella Union Hotel site	Fletcher Bowron Square; 34°03′17″N 118°14′27″W	Los Angeles	
Brand Park	150	Brand Park	15174 San Fernando Mission Blvd. 34°16′21″N 118°27′26″W	Los Angeles	
Campo de Cahuenga	151	Campo de Cahuenga	3919 Lankershim Blvd; 34°08′24″N 118°21′42″W	North Hollywood	Also on the NRHP list as NPS-72001602
Casa Adobe De San Rafael	235	Casa Adobe De San Rafael	1330 Dorothy St. 34°09′58″N 118°15′50″W	Glendale	
Casa De Governor Pio Pico	127	Casa De Governor Pio Pico	Pio Pico State Historic Park; 33°59′37″N 118°04′16″W	Whittier	Also on the NRHP list as NPS-73000408
Casa De San Pedro	920	Casa De San Pedro	Meyler and Quartermaster Rds. 33°43′15″N 118°17′06″W	San Pedro	
The Cascades	653	The Cascades	Foothill Blvd. & Balboa Blvd. 34°19′22″N 118°29′51″W	Sylmar	
Catalina Adobe	637	Catalina Adobe	2211 Bonita Dr. 34°10′48″N 118°13′57″W	Glendale	Also on the NRHP list as NPS-76000487
Cecil B. DeMille Studio Barn	554	Cecil B. DeMille Studio Barn	2100 N. Highland Ave. 34°06′31″N 118°20′10″W	Hollywood	Also on the NRHP list as 14000034
Centinela Springs	363	Centinela Springs	Centinela Park, 700 Warren Ln. 33°58′29″N 118°20′33″W	Inglewood	
Chatsworth Calera	911	Chatsworth Calera	Woolsey Canyon Rd. & Valley Circle Blvd. 34°14′05″N 118°38′31″W	Chatsworth	
Christmas Tree Lane	990	Christmas Tree Lane	Santa Rosa Ave. 34°11′25″N 118°08′09″W	Altadena	Also on the NRHP list as NPS-90001444
Dominguez Ranch House	152	Dominguez Ranch House	18127 S Alameda; 33°52′01″N 118°13′03″W	Compton	Also on the NRHP list as NPS-76000486
Drum Barracks	169	Drum Barracks	1053 Cary St. 33°47′05″N 118°15′24″W	Wilmington	Also on the NRHP list as NPS-71000161
E.J. Baldwin's Queen Anne Cottage	367	E.J. Baldwin's Queen Anne Cottage	Los Angeles State and County Arboretum; 34°08′27″N 118°03′09″W	Arcadia	Also on the NRHP list as NPS-80000804
Ennis House	1011	Ennis House	2655 Glendower Ave. 34°06′58″N 118°17′34″W	Los Angeles	Also on the NRHP list as NPS-71000145
Fred C. Nelles Youth Correctional Facility	947	Fred C. Nelles Youth Correctional Facility	Fred C. Nelles Youth Correctional Facility; 33°58′34″N 118°03′04″W	Whittier	
First home of Pomona College	289	First home of Pomona College	Mission Blvd. & S White St. 34°03′17″N 117°45′32″W	Pomona	
First Jewish site in Los Angeles	822	First Jewish site in Los Angeles	Chavez Ravine; 34°04′11″N 118°14′28″W	Los Angeles	
First United States Air Meet	718	First United States Air Meet	18501 South Wilmington Avenue; 33°51′42″N 118°14′06″W	Carson	
Freeman House	1011	Freeman House	1962 Glencoe Way; 34°06′20″N 118°20′19″W	Los Angeles	Also on the NRHP list as NPS-71000146
Gamble House	871	Gamble House	4 Westmoreland Pl. 34°09′06″N 118°09′39″W	Pasadena	Also on the NRHP list as NPS-71000155
Glendora Bougainvillea	912	Glendora Bougainvillea	E Bennett Ave. at N. Minnesota Ave. 34°08′23″N 117°51′38″W	Glendora	Also on the NRHP list as NPS-78000683
Governor Stoneman Adobe, Los Robles	669	Governor Stoneman Adobe, Los Robles	1912 Montrobles Pl. 34°06′51″N 118°08′10″W	San Marino	
Grave of George Caralambo	646	Grave of George Caralambo	Founders' Memorial Park; 33°59′12″N 118°02′47″W	Whittier	
Griffith Ranch	716	Griffith Ranch	12685 Foothill Blvd at Vaughn St. 34°17′24″N 118°24′41″W	San Fernando	
Hancock Park	170	Hancock Park	5801 Wilshire Blvd; 34°03′49″N 118°21′25″W	Los Angeles	
Harold Lloyd Estate	961	Harold Lloyd Estate	1740 Green Acres Place; 34°05′17″N 118°25′37″W	Beverly Hills	Also known as Greenacres. Also on the NRHP list as NPS-84000876
Hay Tree	1038	Hay Tree	16475 Paramount Blvd. 33°53′03″N 118°09′38″W	Paramount	
Henry Gage Mansion	984	Henry Gage Mansion	7000 E. Gage; 33°58′19″N 118°08′04″W	Bell Gardens	
Upload Photo	664	Heritage House	Willowbrook Ave. & Myrrh St. 33°53′34″N 118°13′28″W	Compton	
Hugo Reid Adobe	368	Hugo Reid Adobe	Los Angeles State and County Arboretum; 34°08′27″N 118°03′11″W	Arcadia	
Jose Dolores Sepulveda Adobe	383	Jose Dolores Sepulveda Adobe	Madison St. & Courtney Way; 33°47′49″N 118°20′53″W	Torrance	
Upload Photo	386	La Casa de Carrión	919 Puddingstone Dr. 34°05′46″N 117°47′20″W	La Verne	
La Mesa Battlefield	167	La Mesa Battlefield	4490 Exchange Ave at Downey Rd. 34°00′09″N 118°12′17″W	Vernon	
Lang Southern Pacific Station	590	Lang Southern Pacific Station	Soledad Canyon; 34°25′52″N 118°22′44″W	Santa Clarita	
Liberty Hill site	1021	Liberty Hill site	5th St. & Harbor Blvd. 33°44′26″N 118°16′50″W	San Pedro	
Llano del Rio	933	Llano del Rio	State Hwy 138; 34°30′23″N 117°49′37″W	Llano	
Long Beach Marine Stadium	1014	Long Beach Marine Stadium	Pete Archer Rowing Center; 33°46′09″N 118°07′58″W	Long Beach	
Los Angeles Memorial Coliseum	960	Los Angeles Memorial Coliseum	University of Southern California; 34°00′51″N 118°17′16″W	Los Angeles	Also on the NRHP list as NPS-84003866
Los Angeles Plaza	156	Los Angeles Plaza	El Pueblo de Los Angeles Historic Monument; 34°03′25″N 118°14′16″W	Los Angeles	
Los Encinos State Historic Park	689	Los Encinos State Historic Park	Los Encinos State Historic Park; 34°09′38″N 118°29′58″W	Encino	
Lugo Adobe	301	Lugo Adobe	El Pueblo de Los Angeles Historic Monument; 34°03′23″N 118°14′18″W	Los Angeles	
Lummis Home	531	Lummis Home	200 E. Ave 43 and Pasadena Freeway; 34°05′35″N 118°12′22″W	Los Angeles	Also on the NRHP list as NPS-71000148
Lyons Station Stagecoach Stop	688	Lyons Station Stagecoach Stop	Eternal Valley Memorial Park, 23287 N Sierra Hwy; 34°21′46″N 118°30′27″W	Newhall	
Manhattan Beach pier	1018	Manhattan Beach pier	Manhattan Beach; 33°53′01″N 118°24′49″W	Manhattan Beach	
Mentryville	516	Mentryville	27201 W. Pico Canyon Rd. 34°22′45″N 118°36′40″W	Newhall	
Merced Theatre	171	Merced Theatre	El Pueblo de Los Angeles Historic Monument; 34°03′22″N 118°14′23″W	Los Angeles	
Mirror Building	744	Mirror Building	145 S. Spring St. 34°03′07″N 118°14′43″W	Los Angeles	
Mission San Fernando Rey de España	157	Mission San Fernando Rey de España	15151 San Fernando Mission Blvd. 34°16′23″N 118°27′40″W	Mission Hills	Also on the NRHP list as NPS-71001076
Mission San Gabriel Arcángel	158	Mission San Gabriel Arcángel	537 W Mission Dr. 34°05′51″N 118°06′23″W	San Gabriel	Also on the NRHP list as NPS-71000158
Mission Vieja	161	Mission Vieja	N. Gabriel Blvd. & N. Lincoln Ave. 34°01′51″N 118°04′24″W	Montebello	
The Mojave Road	963	The Mojave Road	Drum Barracks to Route 66 crosses LA County line into San Bernardino County; 33°47′05″N 118°15′29″W		
Naval and Marine Corps Reserve Center	972	Naval and Marine Corps Reserve Center	1700 Stadium Way; 34°04′10″N 118°14′33″W	Los Angeles	
Nuestra Señora Reina de los Angeles	144	Nuestra Señora Reina de los Angeles	535 N Main St. 34°03′25″N 118°14′22″W	Los Angeles	
Oak of the Golden Dream	168	Oak of the Golden Dream	I-5 and Lyons Ave. 34°23′N 118°35′W	Newhall	
Old Mill	302	Old Mill	1120 Old Mill Rd. 34°07′08″N 118°07′41″W	San Marino	Also on the NRHP list as NPS-71000154
Old Plaza Firehouse	730	Old Plaza Firehouse	El Pueblo de Los Angeles Historic Monument; 34°03′22″N 118°14′20″W	Los Angeles	
Old Salt Lake	373	Old Salt Lake	Harbor Dr. & Yacht Club Way; 33°51′07″N 118°23′49″W	Redondo Beach	
Old Santa Monica Forestry Station	840	Old Santa Monica Forestry Station	Rustic Canyon; 34°02′13″N 118°30′54″W	Los Angeles	
Old Short Cut	632	Old Short Cut	Angeles National Forest; 34°19′36″N 118°00′21″W	La Cañada Flintridge	
Old Trapper's Lodge	939.5	Old Trapper's Lodge	Los Angeles Pierce College; 34°11′06″N 118°35′00″W	Woodland Hills	
Old Whaling Station	381	Old Whaling Station	Portuguese Bend; 33°44′05″N 118°21′16″W	Rancho Palos Verdes	
Original building of the University of Southern California	536	Original building of the University of Southern California	University of Southern California; 34°01′11″N 118°16′58″W	Los Angeles	
Upload Photo	451	Ortega-Vigare Adobe	616 S. Ramona St. 34°05′41″N 118°06′28″W	San Gabriel	
Pacific Asia Museum	988	Pacific Asia Museum	46 North Los Robles Ave. 34°08′48″N 118°08′28″W	Pasadena	Also on the NRHP list as NPS-77000300
Paradox Hybrid Walnut Tree	681	Paradox Hybrid Walnut Tree	12300 Whittier Blvd. and Mar Vista; 33°58′26″N 118°02′45″W	Whittier	
Pasadena Playhouse	887	Pasadena Playhouse	39 El Molino Ave. 34°08′43″N 118°08′14″W	Pasadena	Also on the NRHP list as NPS-75000435
Pico House	159	Pico House	El Pueblo de Los Angeles Historic Monument; 34°03′24″N 118°14′22″W	Los Angeles	Also on the NRHP list as NPS-72000231
Pioneer Oil Refinery	172	Pioneer Oil Refinery	23802 Pine Street; 34°22′42″N 118°33′50″W	Santa Clarita	Also on the National Register of Historic Places.
Plummer House and oldest house in Hollywood	160	Plummer House and oldest house in Hollywood	23537 Calabasas Rd. 34°09′27″N 118°38′23″W	Calabasas	
Point Dume	965	Point Dume	Point Dume; 34°00′03″N 118°48′25″W	Malibu	
Pomona Water Powerplant	514	Pomona Water Powerplant	San Antonio Canyon, Camp Baldy Rd. 34°12′44″N 117°40′34″W	Claremont	
Port of Los Angeles Long Wharf in Santa Monica	881	Port of Los Angeles Long Wharf in Santa Monica	Will Rogers State Beach; 34°01′53″N 118°31′38″W	Pacific Palisades	
Portolá Trail Campsite 1	655	Portolá Trail Campsite 1	Elysian Park; 34°04′19″N 118°13′38″W	Los Angeles	
Portolá Trail Campsite 2	665	Portolá Trail Campsite 2	325 South La Cienega Blvd. 34°03′41″N 118°22′33″W	Beverly Hills	
Rancho Los Cerritos Historic Site	978	Rancho Los Cerritos Historic Site	4600 Virginia Rd. 33°50′11″N 118°11′40″W	Long Beach	Also on the NRHP list as NPS-70000135
Rancho San Francisco	556	Rancho San Francisco	The Old Road & Henry Mayo Dr. 34°26′25″N 118°36′19″W	Valencia	
Rio San Gabriel Battlefield	385	Rio San Gabriel Battlefield	Washington Blvd. & Bluff Rd. 33°59′31″N 118°06′40″W	Montebello	
Rómulo Pico Adobe	362	Rómulo Pico Adobe	10940 N Sepulveda Blvd. 34°16′08″N 118°28′03″W	Mission Hills	Also on the NRHP list as NPS-66000211
St. Francis Dam Disaster Site	919	St. Francis Dam Disaster Site	San Francisquito Canyon; 34°32′49″N 118°30′45″W	Santa Clarita (unincorporated)	
St. Vincent's Place	567	St. Vincent's Place	St. Vincent Court; 34°02′44″N 118°15′13″W	Los Angeles	
San Fernando Cemetery	753	San Fernando Cemetery	San Fernando Cemetery, Bledsoe & Foothill; 34°19′15″N 118°26′53″W	Sylmar	
Santa Fe Trail Historical Park	975	Santa Fe Trail Historical Park	3675 Santa Anita Ave, El Monte, CA; 34°04′28″N 118°02′31″W	El Monte	
Savannah Memorial Park	1046	Savannah Memorial Park	9263 Valley Blvd. 34°04′52″N 118°04′04″W	Rosemead	
Serra Springs	522	Serra Springs	University High School; 34°02′42″N 118°27′29″W	Los Angeles	
Site of Home of Diego Sepúlveda	380	Site of Home of Diego Sepúlveda	700 block of Channel St. 33°45′14″N 118°17′33″W	San Pedro	
Site of the Los Angeles Star	789	Site of the Los Angeles Star	Fletcher Bowron Square; 34°03′16″N 118°14′28″W	Los Angeles	
SS Catalina	894	SS Catalina	33°44′55″N 118°16′29″W	Ensenada, Baja California	It was scrapped in 2009. Also on the NRHP list as NPS-76000495.
Temporary detention camp for Japanese Americans Pomona assembly center	934.01	Temporary detention camp for Japanese Americans Pomona assembly center	1101 W McKinley Ave; 34°04′53″N 117°45′59″W	Pomona	
Temporary detention camp for Japanese Americans Santa Anita assembly center	934.07	Temporary detention camp for Japanese Americans Santa Anita assembly center	285 W. Huntington Dr. 34°08′19″N 118°02′46″W	Arcadia	
Timm's Point and Landing	384	Timm's Point and Landing	Sampson Way at Southern Pacific Slip; 33°43′42″N 118°16′31″W	San Pedro	
Tuna Club of Avalon	997	Tuna Club of Avalon	100 St. Catherine Way; 33°21′18″N 118°19′53″W	Avalon	
Watts Towers	993	Watts Towers	1765 East 107th St. 33°56′20″N 118°14′30″W	Los Angeles	Also on the NRHP list as NPS-77000297
Well, Alamitos #1	580	Well, Alamitos #1	Temple Ave. & Hill St. 33°47′50″N 118°09′32″W	Signal Hill	Discovery well in the Signal Hill oil field, June 23, 1921.
Well, CSO 4	516	Well, CSO 4	W. Pico Canyon Rd. 34°22′10″N 118°37′49″W	Stevenson Ranch	Also on the NRHP list as NPS-66000212
Western Hotel	658	Western Hotel	557 W. Lancaster Blvd. 34°41′54″N 118°08′20″W	Lancaster	
Workman Home and Family Cemetery	874	Workman Home and Family Cemetery	15415 E Don Julian Rd; 34°01′12″N 117°57′51″W	City of Industry	
Upload Photo	1063	Black Cat Tavern	3909 Sunset Blvd; 34°05′31″N 118°16′47″W	Los Angeles	

== See also ==
- List of California Historical Landmarks
- National Register of Historic Places listings in Pasadena, California
- National Register of Historic Places listings in Los Angeles County, California
- National Register of Historic Places listings in Los Angeles, California
