= Ayer Cottage =

Building in Pomona, California, United States

First home of Pomona College
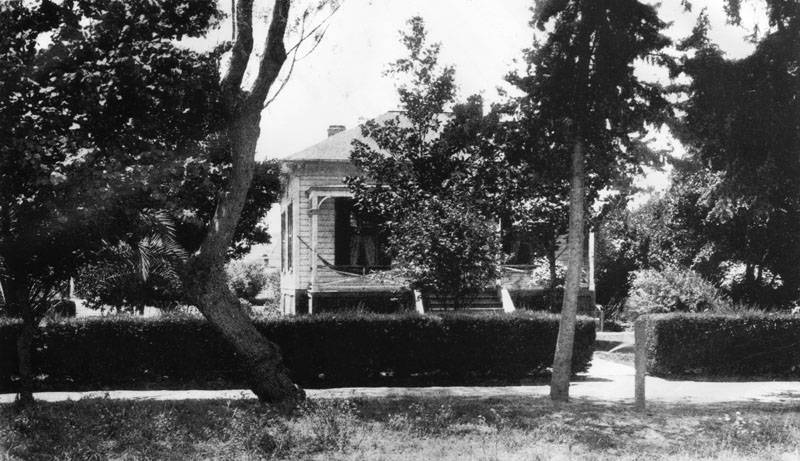
- Ayer Cottage in 1887

- Location within the Los Angeles metropolitan area
- 34°03′17″N 117°45′33″W
- Location: Corner Mission Blvd and South White Street, Pomona, California

History
- Built: 1887

California Historical Landmark
- Designated: June 27, 1938
- Reference no.: 289

Ayer Cottage was the place of first meeting of Pomona College on September 12, 1888, in Pomona, California in Los Angeles County. It was designated a California Historic Landmark (No. 289) on June 27, 1938. It was built in 1887, and in 1888 rented to the college so that classes could be held there. The cottage had five rooms, each used as classrooms. The cottage has been moved to 1492 S Hamilton Blvd Pomona CA stand at about 500 S White St., although a commemorative marker on the site is present.

== Role in Pomona College history ==
Pomona College was incorporated on October 14, 1887, by a group of Congregationalists who wanted to recreate a "college of the New England type" in Southern California. Tuition was initially set at $60 per year for the Collegiate Department. After holding classes at Ayer College for two years, it planned to relocate to Piedmont Mesa north of Pomona, but was instead offered the site of an unfinished hotel in Claremont, California, a few miles away. The trustees chose to accept the offer, and the college relocated there in 1889 but kept its name. The hotel building would eventually become Sumner Hall, the current location of the college's admissions office. The college's first graduating class, in 1894, had ten members.

Pomona College founders’ values led to the college's belief in educational equity. Like other Congregationalist-founded colleges such as Harvard, Dartmouth, Middlebury, and Bowdoin, Pomona received its own governing board, ensuring its independence. The board of trustees was originally composed of graduates of Williams, Dartmouth, Bates and Yale, among others.

Pomona College went on to become the founding member of the Claremont Colleges consortium in the 1920s. Today, it is fully nonsectarian, and is widely considered the premier liberal arts college on the West Coast.

== Marker ==
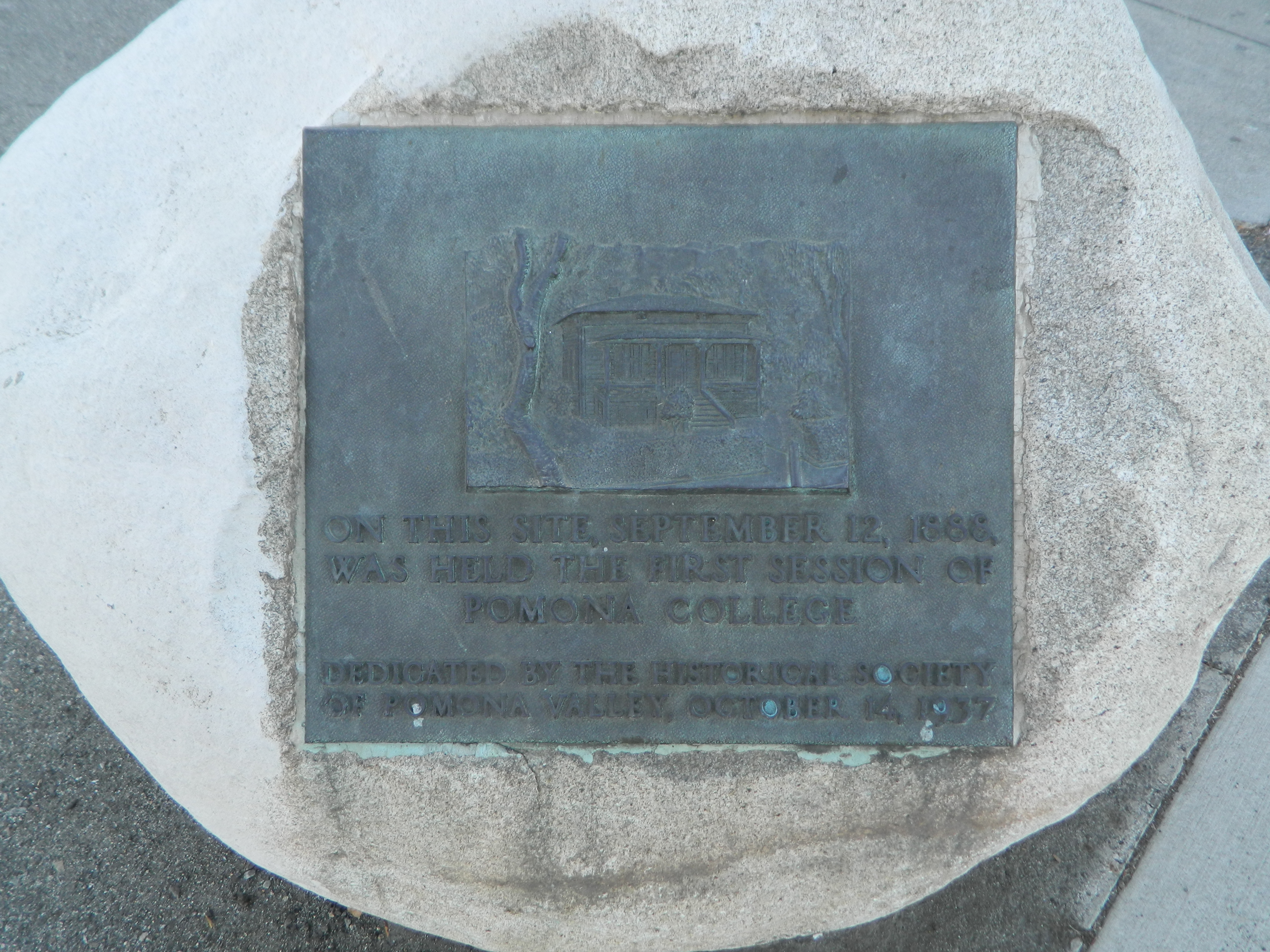
The marker on the site

The marker on the site reads:

On this site, September 12, 1888, was held the first session of Pomona College. 1937 by Historical Society of Pomona Valley. (Marker Number 289.)

California Historical Landmarks reports:

NO. 289 FIRST HOME OF POMONA COLLEGE - Pomona College, incorporated October 14, 1887, held its first class in this small frame cottage on September 12, 1888. Those in attendance consisted of a mere handful of eager students, five faculty members, and the president, Professor Edwin C. Norton. Five months later, in January 1889, the college moved to an unfinished boom hotel on a plot of land in the town of Claremont.

== See also ==
- California Historical Landmarks in Los Angeles County
