= Griffith Ranch =

California historic landmark

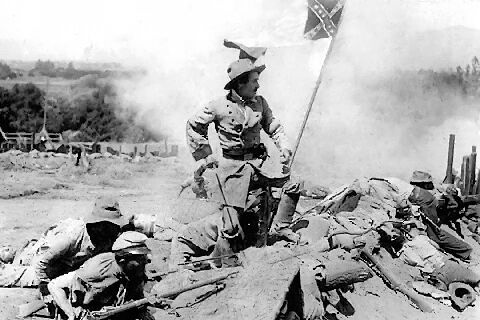
- 1915 Film Birth of a Nation shot on the Griffith Ranch

- Location within the Los Angeles metropolitan area
- 34°17′24″N 118°24′41″W
- Location: 12685 Foothill Blvd, San Fernando, Ca

History
- Built: 1912

California Historical Landmark
- Designated: Dec. 02, 1959
- Reference no.: 716

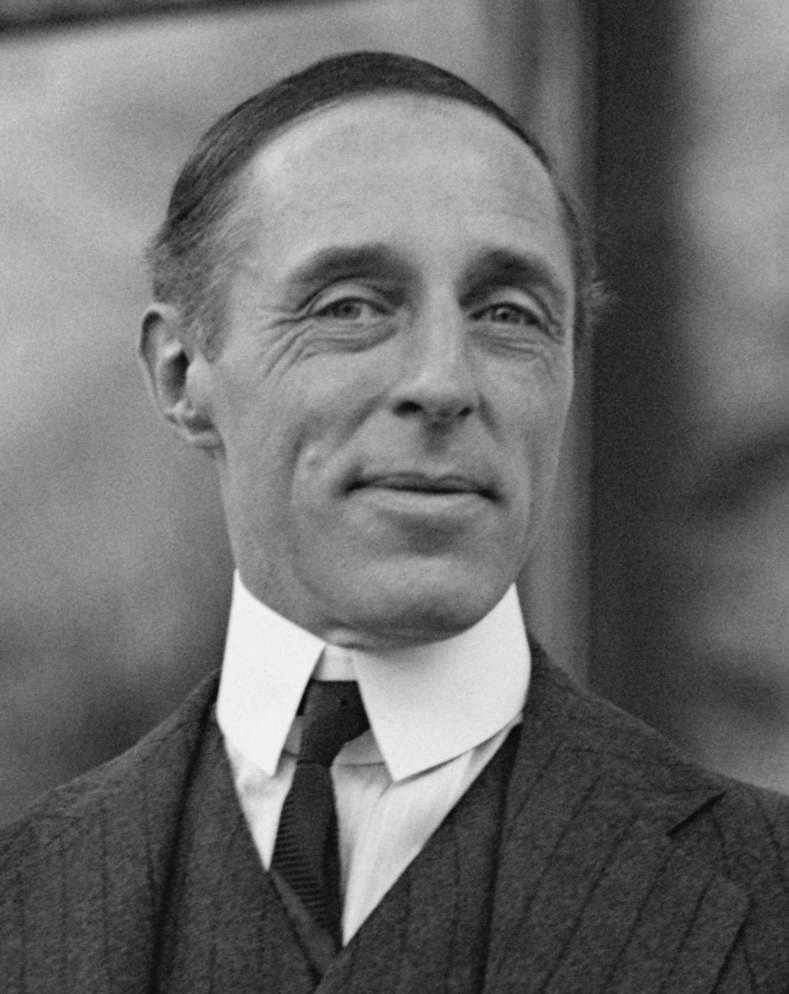
D. W. Griffith in 1922

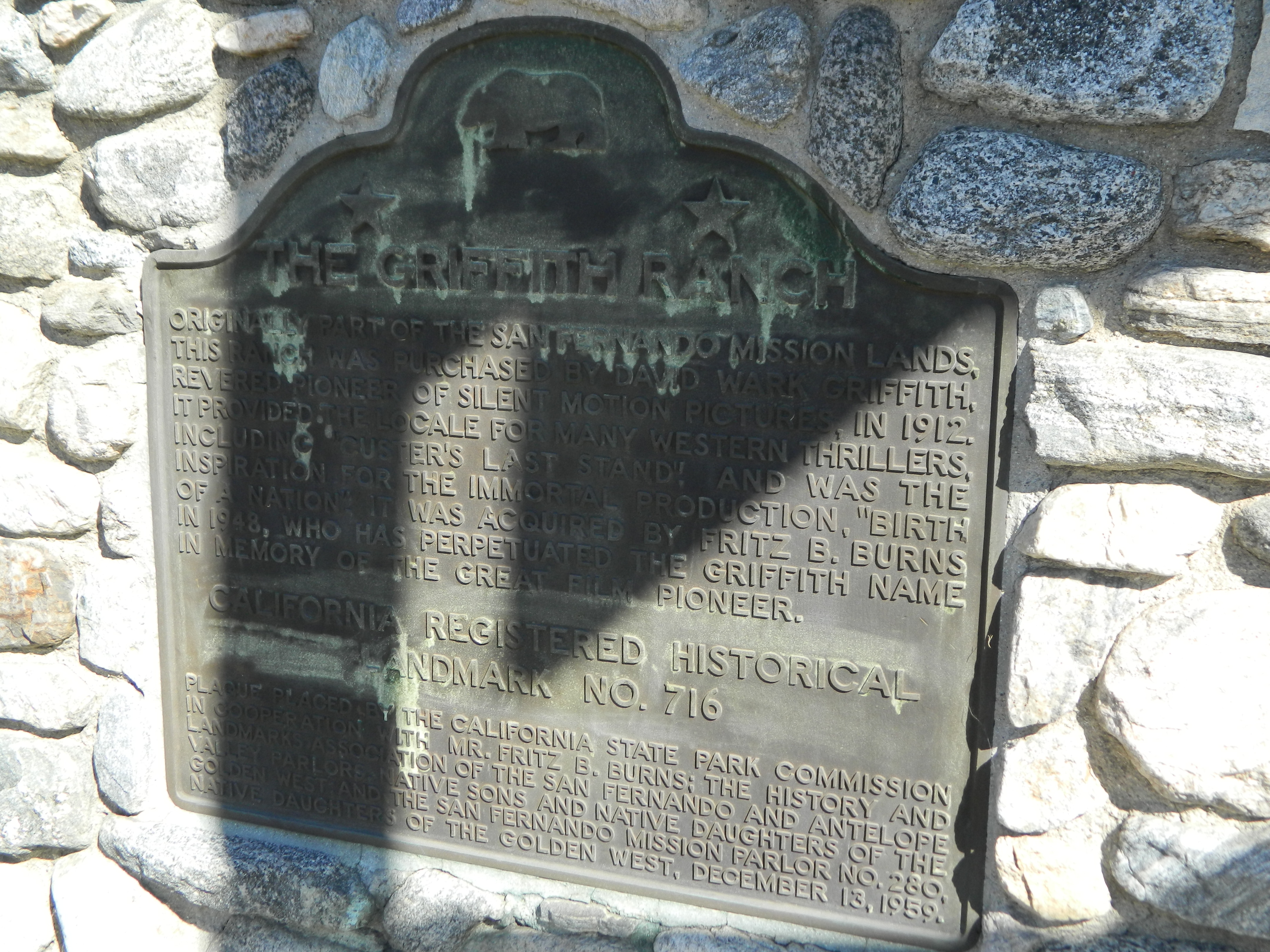
Site of Griffith Ranch marker

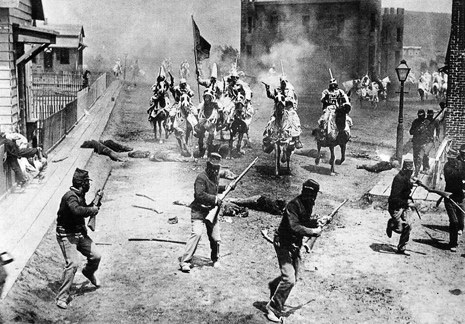
1915 Film Birth of a Nation shot on the Griffith Ranch

Griffith Ranch was owned by D. W. Griffith, a pioneer of silent motion pictures. He purchased the ranch in 1912, and is said to have filmed famous movies at the site, such as The Birth of a Nation (1915), Broken Blossoms (1919), Way Down East (1920) and Orphans of the Storm (1921). However, in almost all cases, such citations have not been validated. Griffith made about 500 films over the course of his career, filming some on his ranch. His last film was The Struggle (1931). The ranch is on what was formerly land belonging to the San Fernando Mission. The Griffith Ranch was designated a California Historic Landmark (No. 716) on Dec. 2, 1959. The ranch was sold in 1948 to residential developer Fritz B. Burns. In memory of the silent film pioneer, Burns did not change the ranch's name. The ranch is near the current Interstate 210 and California State Route 118 freeways in Sylmar, California at the north end of the San Fernando Valley.

== Marker ==
The marker on the site reads:

- NO. 716 GRIFFITH RANCH - Originally part of the San Fernando Mission lands, this ranch was purchased by David Wark Griffith, revered pioneer of silent motion pictures, in 1912. It provided the locale for many western thrillers, including Custer's Last Stand, and was the inspiration for the immortal production, Birth of a Nation. In 1948 it was acquired by Fritz B. Burns, who has perpetuated the Griffith name in memory of the great film pioneer.

== See also ==
- D. W. Griffith House in La Grange, Kentucky
- D. W. Griffith filmography
- List of California Ranchos
- California Historical Landmarks in Los Angeles County
- Ranchos of Los Angeles County, California
