= Hay Tree =

Historic site in Paramount, California

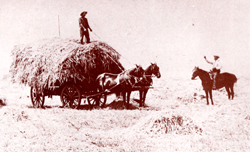
- Hynes hay framing 1920

- Location within the Los Angeles metropolitan area
- 33°53′03″N 118°09′38″W
- Location: 16475 Paramount Blvd., Paramount

History
- Built: 1883

California Historical Landmark
- Designated: August 8, 2003
- Reference no.: 1038

Hay Tree is a historic camphor tree in downtown Paramount, California, United States. The Hay Tree was designated a California Historic Landmark (No. 1038) on August 8, 2003. At the time of planting in 1883 the tree was in the town of Hynes. The towns of Hynes and Clearwater were incorporated into the town of Paramount in 1948. Paramount was officially incorporated on January 30, 1957. The Hay Tree is 50 feet (15 m) high and surrounded by a small grass park. The Hay Tree is a reminder of the area's busy hay and dairy industry. From 1930 to 1960 the towns of Hyne and Clearwater were known as the “Hay Capital” of the world. The area was also known as “The Milk Shed of Los Angeles” and “The World’s Largest Hay Market.” These titles were given for the vast hay fields and dairy farms in the area. There were over 25,000 milk cows in the towns of Hynes and Clearwater at this time. The price of the Hay on the international markets was set each morning at the Hay Tree. In the 1960s and 1970s the region slowly became an urban area. House and stores replaced milk production. Many of the dairy farms moved to nearby Ontario and Chino. The Hay Tree has both a California State Marker and a city education display. The site also has benches and wooden cow display. The Hay Tree is at the entrance to Paramount Civic center. A local artist wrote and performed a song about the tree.

== Marker ==
The marker reads:

- The Hay Tree: The 120-year-old, 50-foot-tall camphor is one of the few remnants of the once-thriving dairy and hay industry that dominated Southeastern Los Angeles County and Northwestern Orange County from the 1920s through the 1950s. Each morning beneath the wide-spanning branches of the Hay Tree, the price of hay was set for the region’s dairies; that price was then quoted in hay markets around the world.

== See also ==
- California Historical Landmarks in Los Angeles County
- List of California Ranchos
- Ranchos of Los Angeles County, California
