= Los Angeles Pierce College =

Community college in Los Angeles, California, US

Coordinates: 34.183921°N 118.5750531°W

- Type: Public community college
- Established: 1947
- Parent institution: LACCD
- Accreditation: ACCJC
- President: Aracely Aguiar
- Students: 23,000
- Location: Woodland Hills, Los Angeles, California, U.S.
- Campus: Urban, 426 acres (172 ha)
- Colors: Scarlet & white
- Nickname: Brahmas
- Sporting affiliations: CCCAA – WSC, SCFA (football)
- Mascot: Brahma Bull
- Website: piercecollege.edu

Los Angeles Pierce College, shortened to Pierce College or simply Pierce, is a public community college in the San Fernando Valley neighborhood of Woodland Hills in Los Angeles, California. It is part of the Los Angeles Community College District and is accredited by the Accrediting Commission for Community and Junior Colleges. It serves 22,000 students each semester.

The college began with 70 students and 18 faculty members on September 15, 1947. Originally known as the Clarence W. Pierce School of Agriculture, the institution's initial focus was crop cultivation and animal husbandry. Nine years later, in 1956, the school was renamed to Los Angeles Pierce Junior College, retaining the name of its founder, Dr. Pierce, as well as his commitment to agricultural and veterinary study. (Pierce still maintains a 225-acre (91 ha) working farm for hands-on training.)

== Academics ==
Pierce College offers courses on more than 100 subjects in 92 academic disciplines, and has transfer alliances with most of the universities in the state. Students at the school successfully transfer to UC and CSU schools.

Students can pursue any of the 44 associate's degrees or 78 Certificates of Achievement the school offers directly.

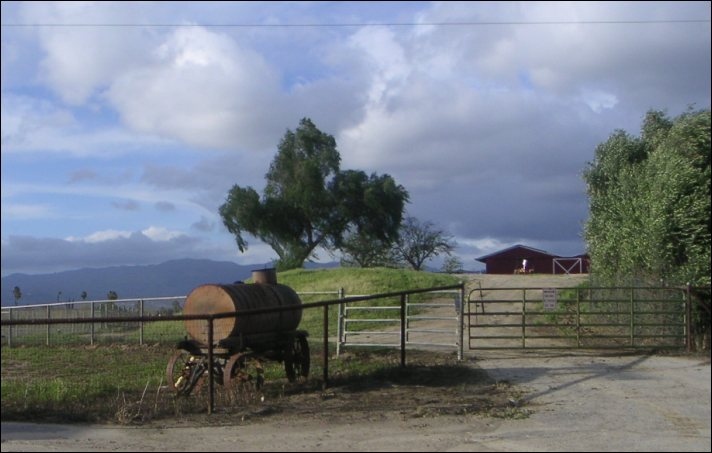
The western rural Farm Area, at Los Angeles Pierce College in Woodland Hills.

== Campus ==
Pierce College comprises 426 acres (172 ha) amidst a dense metropolis, an area larger than many university campuses, including that of UCLA. The grounds are landscaped with more than 2,200 trees, thousands of roses and a 1.9-acre (0.77 ha) botanical garden. The Pierce College farm houses small herds of cattle, sheep, goats, and a small poultry flock for its students to learn from.

In June 2017, the LACCD Board of Trustees voted to grant San Francisco Bay Area-based Pacific Dining a concession for dining services, replacing several small vendors at the five LACCD colleges including Pierce. Pacific Dining has not offered food at Pierce since 2020, resulting in few food options on campus.

== John Shepard Stadium ==
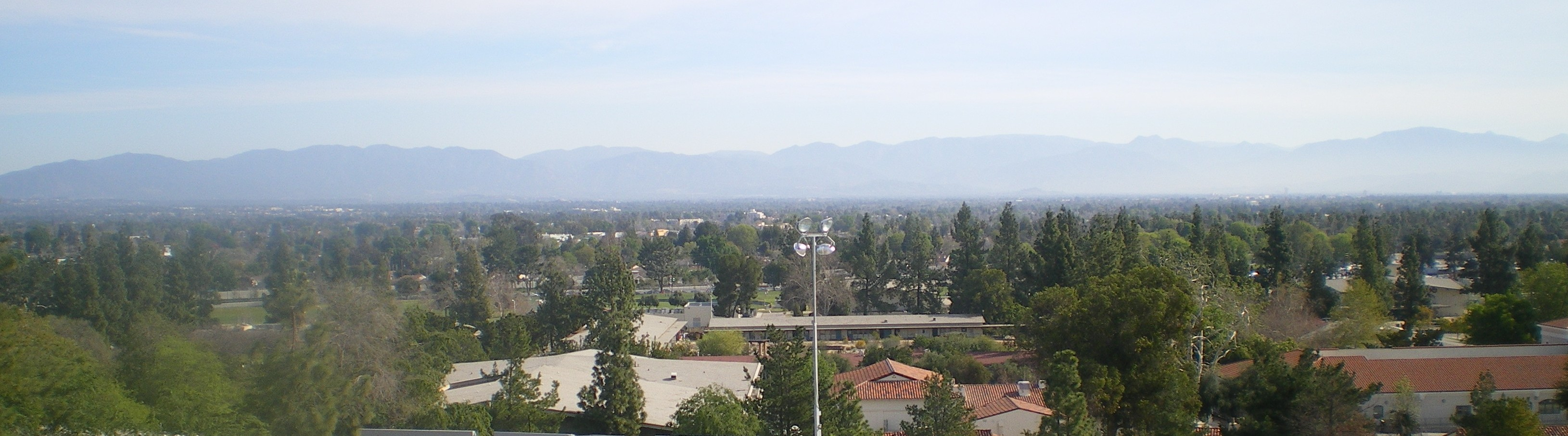
View from the Pierce College Performing Arts Building up in the Chalk Hills, northeast across San Fernando Valley to the San Gabriel Mountains.

Student body composition as of 2022
Race and ethnicity	Total
Hispanic	49%
White	28%
Unknown	10%
Asian	9%
Black	4%
Two or more races (Note: Other consists of Multiracial Americans & those who prefer to not say.)	4%
Foreign national	1%
Gender Distribution
Male	41%
Female	59%
Age Distribution
Under 18	9%
18–24	57%
25–64	33%
Over 65	1%

Besides hosting the Brahmas' football and women's soccer teams, John Shepard Stadium (current capacity 5,500) also has hosted many outdoor professional sporting events in San Fernando Valley history.

From 1976 to 1979, the San Fernando Valley's first professional sports team, the Los Angeles Skyhawks of the American Soccer League, played their home games at the Pierce College stadium.

The Los Angeles Express of the USFL played their last home game here on June 15, 1985. The stadium was expanded to 16,000-person capacity for the game.

Shepard Stadium hosts Nuts for Mutts, an annual dog show and pet fair that raises funds for the New Leash on Life Animal Rescue.

The stadium is also the former home stadium of the San Fernando Valley Quakes men's soccer team, which competed in the USL Premier Development League.

== Transport ==
Pierce College has its own stop on the Metro G/Orange Line, the Pierce College station, on Winnetka Avenue near Victory Boulevard. It is additionally served by Los Angeles Metro Bus lines 164 and 243. There are also multiple stands for the Access Paratransit service. Pierce College students are eligible for the Metro GoPass program, providing free transportation on the Metro system and several other partner transportation agencies. Pierce College also offers an on-campus shuttle bus for transportation within the campus limits.

== Solar power ==
Pierce College has a 191-kilowatt solar generation system that has 1,274 photovoltaic panels and a 360-kilowatt, natural gas co-generation system. This project is the largest of its kind to be undertaken by a U.S. community college, yielding around 4.4 million kilowatt-hours of electricity a year and reducing carbon dioxide emissions by more than 1,500 tons over its operating lifetime. The college also has a water retention pond beneath its soccer field, collecting run-off from the adjacent parking lot. The Los Angeles River is nearby to the north. Under propositions A and AA, a new water reclamation facility is also being planned, and the new facilities will meet rigorous Silver-level guidelines set by the U.S. Green Building Council for Leadership in Energy and Environmental Design.

== Old Trapper's Lodge ==
Old Trapper's Lodge
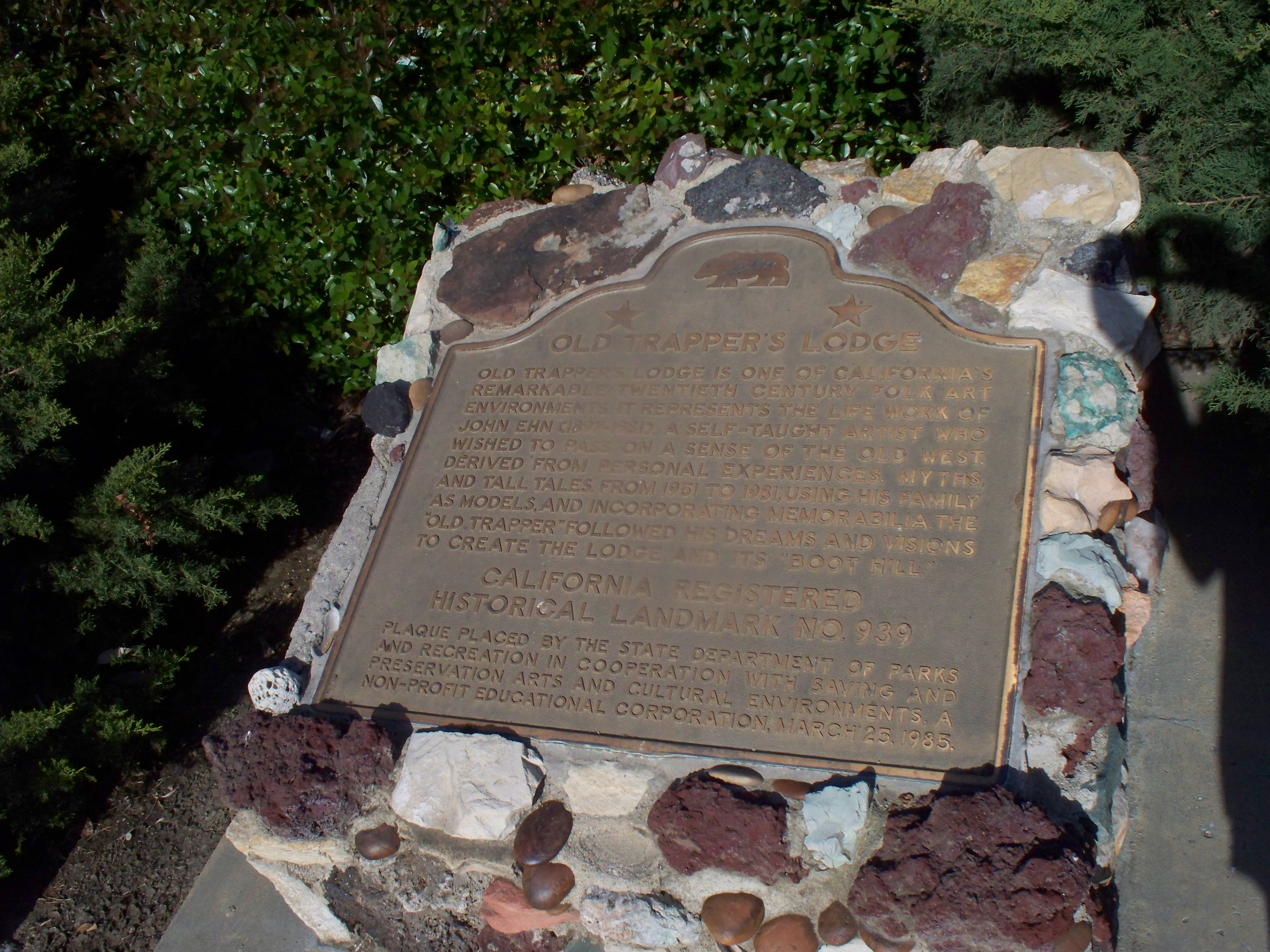
- Interactive map of Old Trapper's Lodge
- Location: Woodland Hills, Los Angeles

History
- Built: 1951 to 1981

Site notes
- Architect: John Ehn

California Historical Landmark
- Reference no.: 939.5

The campus is home to Old Trapper's Lodge, California Historical Landmark No. 939.5, an outsider art environment that pays homage to the pioneer upbringing of its creator John Ehn. It represents the life work of John Ehn (1897–1981), a self-taught artist who wished to pass on a sense of the Old West, derived from personal experiences, myths, and tall tales. From 1951 to 1981, using his family as models, and incorporating memorabilia, the 'Old Trapper' followed his dreams and visions to create the Lodge and its 'Boot Hill.' The artwork was moved from the original site in Sun Valley, CA, and relocated to the college.

== Pierce College Farm and Farm Center ==
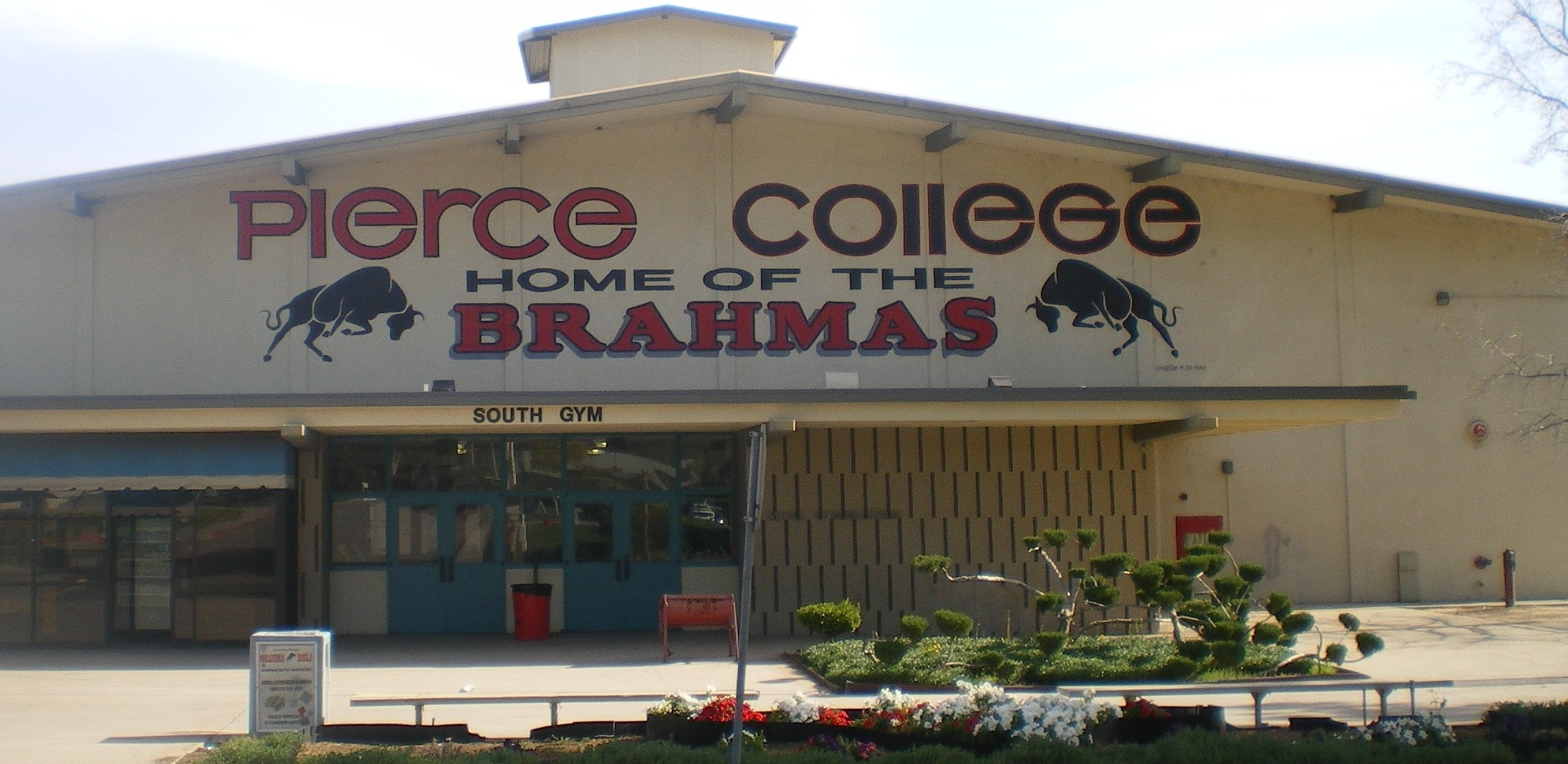
South Gym

The Pierce College Farm covers 226 acres (91 ha) of the college with several units for their animals. The farm has a $13 million equestrian center used for agricultural students' education that offers UC transferable courses for important animal and veterinary science programs.

In April of every year, the Foundation for Pierce College hosts Farmwalk, an outdoor festival including animals, activities, displays, games and music. The Farmwalk also includes face-painting, a petting-zoo and hayrides for children, all to benefit the Pierce College farm.

The Farm Center on the corner of Victory Boulevard and De Soto Avenue is a 32-acre (13 ha) parcel that was partnered between the Foundation for Pierce College and the McBroom family. The McBroom family have invested nearly $3.5 million to operate the Farm Center which covered utility, labor, insurance, and other operational costs. In October the Foundation sponsored an annual Harvest Festival, featuring pumpkins grown on the Pierce farm, a 5-mile (8.0 km) corn maze, rock climbing, games and rides for the children, a petting zoo, live music and Halloween frights for the whole family. In late December 2014, the Farm Center was evicted from Pierce College, and closed to the public.

The college also serves as a Los Angeles County large animal emergency evacuation center. During a slew of fires in Southern California in 2007, Pierce College sheltered and fed more than 150 horses under the direction of the L.A. County Volunteer Equine Response team. The horses were taken in for free at Pierce, and a veterinarian was onsite. Trained volunteers from Pierce's equestrian program assisted the county rescue effort.

== Weather station ==
The Pierce College weather station was one of the first to cooperate with the government to provide archived data online as well as being one of the oldest operational cooperative weather stations in the country. It was founded under the direction of Professor A. Lee Haines on July 1, 1949, two years after the college was founded. In 2009, the Pierce College Weather Station was awarded $85,000 used to provide the station with new sensors that are rare for co-op stations in the U.S. The Weather Station organizes tours showing their equipment and their functions upon request.

== Athletics ==
The college athletic teams are nicknamed the Brahmas and currently fields six men's and six women's varsity teams. Pierce competes as a member of the California Community College Athletic Association (CCCAA) in the Western State Conference (WSC) for all sports except football, which competes in Southern California Football Association (SCFA). In 2009 the Pierce Brahmas won the American Pacific Conference, losing in the first round of bowl playoffs to the National Champs Mt. San Antonio College.

== Student government ==
The students of Pierce College have established a student body association named Los Angeles Pierce College Associated Student Organization (ASO). The association is required by law to "encourage students to participate in the governance of the college".

The ASO periodically participates in meetings sponsored by a statewide community college student organization named Student Senate for California Community Colleges. The statewide Student Senate is authorized by law "to advocate before the Legislature and other state and local governmental entities".

== Notable alumni and staff ==
- Ellen Albertini Dow, actress (The Wedding Singer) aided her husband, Eugene Francis Dow, in founding the Theater Department.
- Jimmy Allen, NFL defensive back
- Gene LeBell, Stuntman
- Rick Auerbach, former MLB shortstop
- Nick Arbuckle, CFL quarterback
- Mark Balderas, keyboardist for RCA recording artist "Human Drama"
- Kevin Barnett, volleyball player
- Danny Bonaduce, actor (The Partridge Family) and radio personality
- Coco Crisp, baseball player
- Suzanne Crough, actress (The Partridge Family)
- Denny Crum, basketball coach
- Doug DeCinces, baseball player
- Marv Dunphy, volleyball coach
- Ron Goldman, murder victim (O. J. Simpson murder case)
- Robin Graham, missing person (since 1970)
- Gary LeRoi Gray, actor
- Keith Green, gospel musician and songwriter
- Melanie Griffith, actress
- Mark Harmon, college football player and actor
- Steve Hertz, baseball coach
- Bernard Jackson, NFL defensive back
- Keith Jardine, wrestler and football player; retired mixed martial artist, formerly for the UFC, Strikeforce, and King of the Cage
- Karen Kingsbury, novelist
- Erik Kramer, NFL quarterback
- Shia LaBeouf, actor
- Babe Laufenberg, NFL quarterback
- Bob Lazar, Area 51 conspiracy theorist
- Minnette Gersh Lenier, magician and teacher of literacy
- Kevin Mitnick, computer security consultant, author and hacker
- Mary Perry, volleyball player
- Steve Reed, baseball player
- Elliot Rodger, (did not graduate) perpetrator of the 2014 Isla Vista killings
- Riley Salmon, volleyball player, 2008 Beijing Olympics Gold Medalist
- Bob Samuelson, volleyball player
- Paul Schrier, actor
- Scott Shaw, author, actor, filmmaker
- Bobby Sherman, singer, actor and songwriter
- Max Steinberg (1989–2014), American-Israeli IDF lone soldier killed in the 2014 Gaza War
- Richard Stock, baseball player
- Uri Treisman, professor of math and of public affairs at University of Texas at Austin, founder and executive director of the Charles A. Dana Center
- Barry Van Dyke, actor and son of Dick Van Dyke
- Marion Vree, choral conductor, composer and educator
- Paul Walker, actor and philanthropist
- Ron Weaver, football player who prolonged his eligibility under an assumed name
- John Whitaker, actor
- Rodney Williams, American football player
- Anton Yelchin, actor
- Barry Zito, baseball player
