= Liberty Hill site =

California historic landmark

- Location within the Los Angeles metropolitan area
- 33°44′26″N 118°16′50″W
- Location: 5th St. & Harbor Blvd. San Pedro, California

History
- Built: 1923

California Historical Landmark
- Designated: March 3, 1997
- Reference no.: 1021

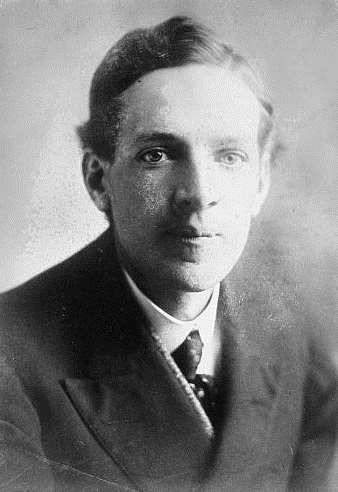
Upton Sinclair spoke at Liberty Hill site on May 15, 1923

Liberty Hill site in San Pedro, Los Angeles, California was the site of the 1923 strike by the Marine Transport Workers Industrial Union 510 a part of the Industrial Workers of the World (IWW). The strike was called to draw attention to the worker's low wages and poor working conditions. It was also to draw attention to some union activists that had been arrested and lockup for violating the California Criminal Syndicalism Act passed on April 30, 1919, by Governor William Stephens, which criminalized syndicalism. The strike tied up 90 ships in Port of Los Angeles San Pedro. The Liberty Hill site was designated a California Historic Landmark (No. 1021) on March 3, 1997.

On May 15, 1923, writer Upton Sinclair spoke to approximately 3,000 striking longshoremen at Liberty Hill. Sinclair used street theater to highlight ongoing suppression of freedom of speech by the LAPD, Sinclair began his address by reading the Bill of Rights. Within moments, he was arrested. The strike did not achieve its goal, but did start a movement that found success in the 1930s, the Congress of Industrial Organizations. The California Criminal Syndicalism Act was found unconstitutional in 1968.

- The Liberty Hill Foundation was started in 1976, it name was given from the 1923 Liberty Hill event. "

== Marker ==
Marker on the site reads:

- NO. 1021 LIBERTY HILL SITE - In 1923 the Marine Transport Workers Industrial Union 510, a branch of the Industrial Workers of the World (IWW), called a strike that immobilized 90 ships here in San Pedro. The union protested low wages, bad working conditions, and the imprisonment of union activists under California's Criminal Syndicalism Law. Denied access to public property, strikers and their supporters rallied here at this site they called "Liberty Hill." Writer Upton Sinclair was arrested for reading from the Bill of Rights to a large gathering. The strike failed but laid a foundation for success in the 1930s. The Syndicalism Law was ruled unconstitutional in 1968.

== See also ==
- California Historical Landmarks in Los Angeles County
