= Casa de Rancho San Antonio =

California historic landmark

Henry Gage Mansion
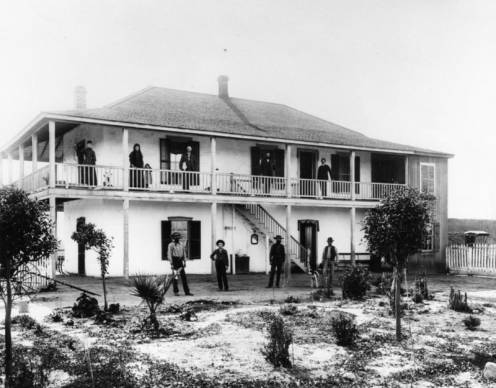
- The Vicente Lugo Adobe, torn down in 1951

- Location within the Los Angeles metropolitan area
- 33°58′19″N 118°08′04″W
- Location: 7000 E. Gage, Bell Gardens, California

History
- Built: 1810

California Historical Landmark
- Designated: May 26, 1989
- Reference no.: 984

The Casa de Rancho San Antonio, also known as the Gage Mansion, is the oldest remaining house in Los Angeles County. Construction began in 1795 by Antonio María Lugo, a prominent Californio ranchero. Today, the California Historic Landmark is located within the city of Bell Gardens, California.

== History ==
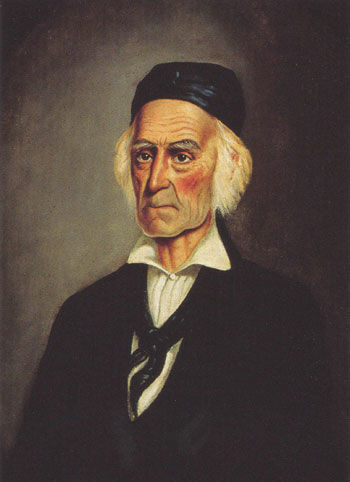
Antonio María Lugo, a prominent Californio ranchero, began building Casa de Rancho San Antonio in 1795.

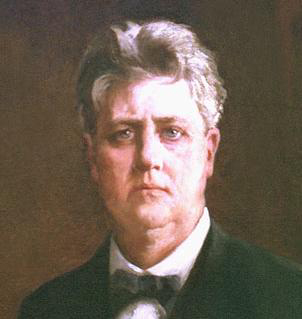
Henry Tifft Gage

Francisco Salvador Lugo and his son Antonio María Lugo began construction in 1795 on Casa de Rancho San Antonio on the land called Rancho San Antonio. Antonio Lugo served as the Alcalde (Mayor) of Los Angeles. The house is located at 7000 East Gage Avenue in Bell Gardens. It was built to qualify the younger Lugo, a former Spanish colonial soldier, for a land grant from the Spanish crown. In 1810, Antonio María Lugo completed the house and received the grant, naming his new grant Rancho San Antonio. The ranch eventually grew to encompass 29,513 acres (119.43 km^{2}), including what are now the cities of Bell Gardens, Commerce, and parts of Bell, Cudahy, Lynwood, Montebello, South Gate, Vernon and East Los Angeles. When California became part of the U.S. in 1850, Lugo, as did all recipients of Spanish/Mexican land grants, began losing portions of his land to the growing population of Anglo newcomers. The ranch adobe, however, continued to be owned and used by the Lugo family.

By 1865, most of the Lugo ranch, divided among five sons and three daughters, had been sold off for as little as a dollar per acre. The original adobe ranch home, however, remained in the family.

In 1880, attorney Henry Gage, a transplant from Saginaw, Michigan, married one of Lugo's great-granddaughters, Francis "Fanny" Rains. The original adobe ranch home was gifted to Gage as a wedding dowry and it became known as the Gage Mansion. When Gage acquired the mansion, he embarked on a restoration project that included the incorporation of fine French wallpaper and the prominent display of the Gage family crest in the fireplace tiles. In 1898, Gage was elected the 20th governor of California. He served in that office from 1899 to 1903. In 1910, he was appointed by President William Howard Taft to serve as U.S. Minister to Portugal. He resigned after only one year due to his wife's health problems. Gage lived in the single-story adobe ranch house until his death in 1924.

A century later, the Gage Mansion was all that remained of the once great Rancho San Antonio. In 1983 the Casa Mobile Home Park, a cooperative of mobile home owners renting lots on the property, purchased the land and the house from their ailing landlord, a Lugo descendant. Although they were aware of the historical significance of the old house, they had no means of maintaining it. In 1987 Bell Gardens City Councilwoman Letha Viles began working to get the house listed on the state historical registry, making it eligible for maintenance grants.

Unfortunately, the Gage Mansion has not been properly maintained, despite its eligibility for grants under the Mills Act. A 2017 article in Los Angeles Magazine outlined how the homeowners within the Casa Mobile Home Park will not increase their own monthly payments in order for the landmark to undergo the maintenance it so desperately needs. Homeowners reportedly do not care about the history, nor do they want the site again open to the public due to fear of strangers walking around the property.

== Marker ==
The California Historic Landmark marker reads:

- Contained within this building are the remaining portions of an adobe house built by Francisco Salvador Lugo and his son Antonio María Lugo. Francisco Lugo was a prominent early landholder and Antonio served as the Alcalde of Los Angeles. They completed the building by 1810. Henry Tifft Gage acquired the property in 1880 and lived here from 1883 until 1924. Gage served as the Governor of California from 1899 to 1903.

== See also ==
- California Historical Landmarks in Los Angeles County
- List of California Ranchos
- Ranchos of Los Angeles County, California
