= Heritage House (Compton, California) =

California historic landmark

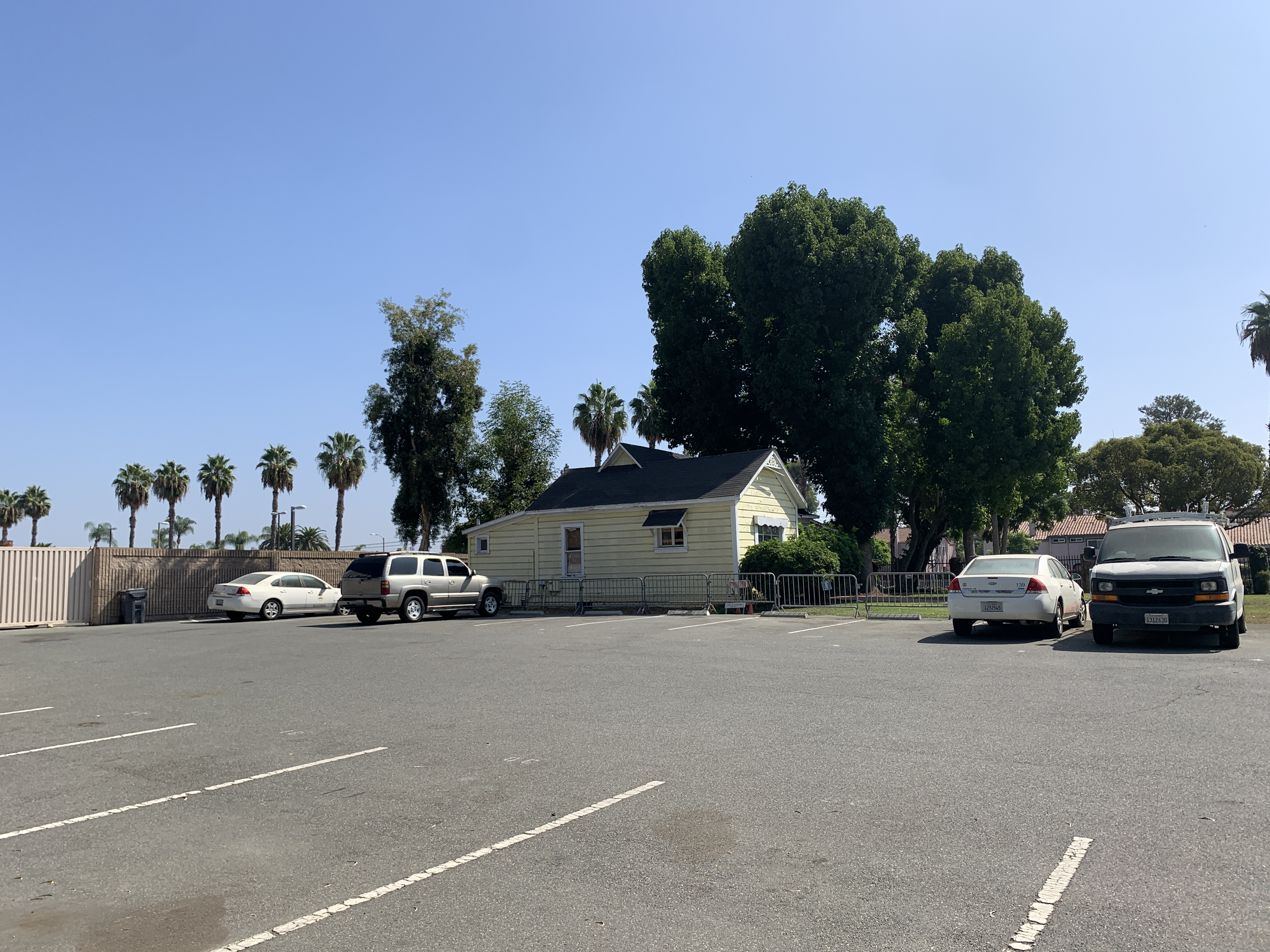

- Location within the Los Angeles metropolitan area
- 33°53′34″N 118°13′29″W
- Location: 205 S. Willowbrook Ave, Compton, Ca

History
- Built: 1810

California Historical Landmark
- Designated: Nov. 05, 1958
- Reference no.: 664

The Heritage House is the oldest remaining house in Compton, California. It was built in 1869 at 209 South Acacia Street. In 1869, when A. R. Loomis built it, the home had two rooms; later owners added more rooms. The Heritage House was designated a California Historical Landmark (No. 664) on Nov. 5, 1958. In 1959 the home was purchased by the City of Compton and moved to the northwest corner of Willowbrook Avenue and Myrrh Street in Compton. Since then the home has been restored and refurnished as a reminder of the early settlers of the community.

A.R. Loomis sold the home to the Gaines family. The City purchased the land and home to build a new fire station. As the house was known as the oldest home in Compton, there was a public call to protect it. The City of Compton moved the home to city-owned land next to Compton City Hall, in the Civic Center. City volunteers helped in the move of the home with money, labor and materials. After the home's restoration it was turned into a museum, with an opening ceremony on April 14, 1958. The museum was decorated to look like a home in the 1860s and 1870s. Most of the museum's decorations were donated. The care and upkeep of the museum was given to the non-profit organization Native Daughters of the Golden West.

== Marker ==
A California Historical Landmark marker on the site reads:

- As originally built in 1869 by A. R. Loomis, the house had only two rooms, but other rooms were added by subsequent occupants. It was marked as the 'Oldest House in Compton' in 1955 - in 1957, it was purchased by the city and moved from 209 South Acacia Street to its present site. It has been restored, refurnished, and renamed by the citizens of Compton as a tribute to early settlers of the community.

== See also ==
- California Historical Landmarks in Los Angeles County
- List of California Ranchos
- Ranchos of Los Angeles County, California
- Dominguez Rancho Adobe in Compton, California
- Lummis House is California Historic Landmark (No. 531) in Los Angeles.
