= Ortega-Vigare Adobe =

California historic landmark

- Location within the Los Angeles metropolitan area
- 34°05′40″N 118°06′28″W
- Location: San Gabriel, California

History
- Built: 1792

California Historical Landmark
- Designated: Nov. 2, 1949
- Reference no.: 451

The Ortega-Vigare Adobe is second oldest adobe in the San Gabriel Valley, built in 1792. The Ortega-Vigare Adobe was designated a California Historic Landmark (No.632) on Nov. 2, 1949. The Ortega-Vigare Adobe is located is in what is now the City of San Gabriel, California in Los Angeles County at 616 S Ramona Street, San Gabriel, Cal.

== Overview ==
The Ortega-Vigare Adobe is named after two of the past residents the Ortega family and the Vigare family. The Adobe is 1,000 feet south of the Mission San Gabriel Arcángel. A soldier of the mission built the Adobe between 1792 and 1806. The Adobe was passed down a few generations to his children. Don Jean Vigare became the owner in 1859. Soon it became San Gabriel's first bakery. Baking next to the Missions Lime orchard and a large cactus wall. After the bakery, the Adobe was returned to a private home again. Mrs. Lux Vigare, great-granddaughter of a soldier of the Mission San Gabriel Archangel lived at the Adobe the 1930s. In 1993 the Adobe was purchased, the new owner saved the Adobe demolition. The new owner restored the Adobe and installed modern convenience, with keeping the Spanish-style. The current Adobe is a 3760 square-foot home on a three-fourths of an acre. The adobe has the historic 24-inch-thick Adobe walls. The living room has high ceilings original large wood beams. The Adobe now has a cobblestone courtyard with an eighteenth century-fountain. The originally Adobe was in the traditional L-shaped, but is half the original size. Added later was a 864-square-foot guest house. In 2011 the Adobe was sold again.

== Marker ==
Marker on the site reads:

- "NO. 451 THE ORTEGA-VIGARE ADOBE – Erected during mission days, 1792–1805, this is the second oldest adobe in this region. Originally 'L'-shaped, it is now only half its original size. In 1859, the adobe became the property of Don Jean Vigare and in the early 1860s, as San Gabriel's first bakery, it was separated from the mission's lime orchard by a high cactus wall."

As of 2025, it remains a private residence.

== See also ==
- California Historical Landmarks in Los Angeles County
- List of California Ranchos
- Ranchos of Los Angeles County, California
