= Old Trapper's Lodge =

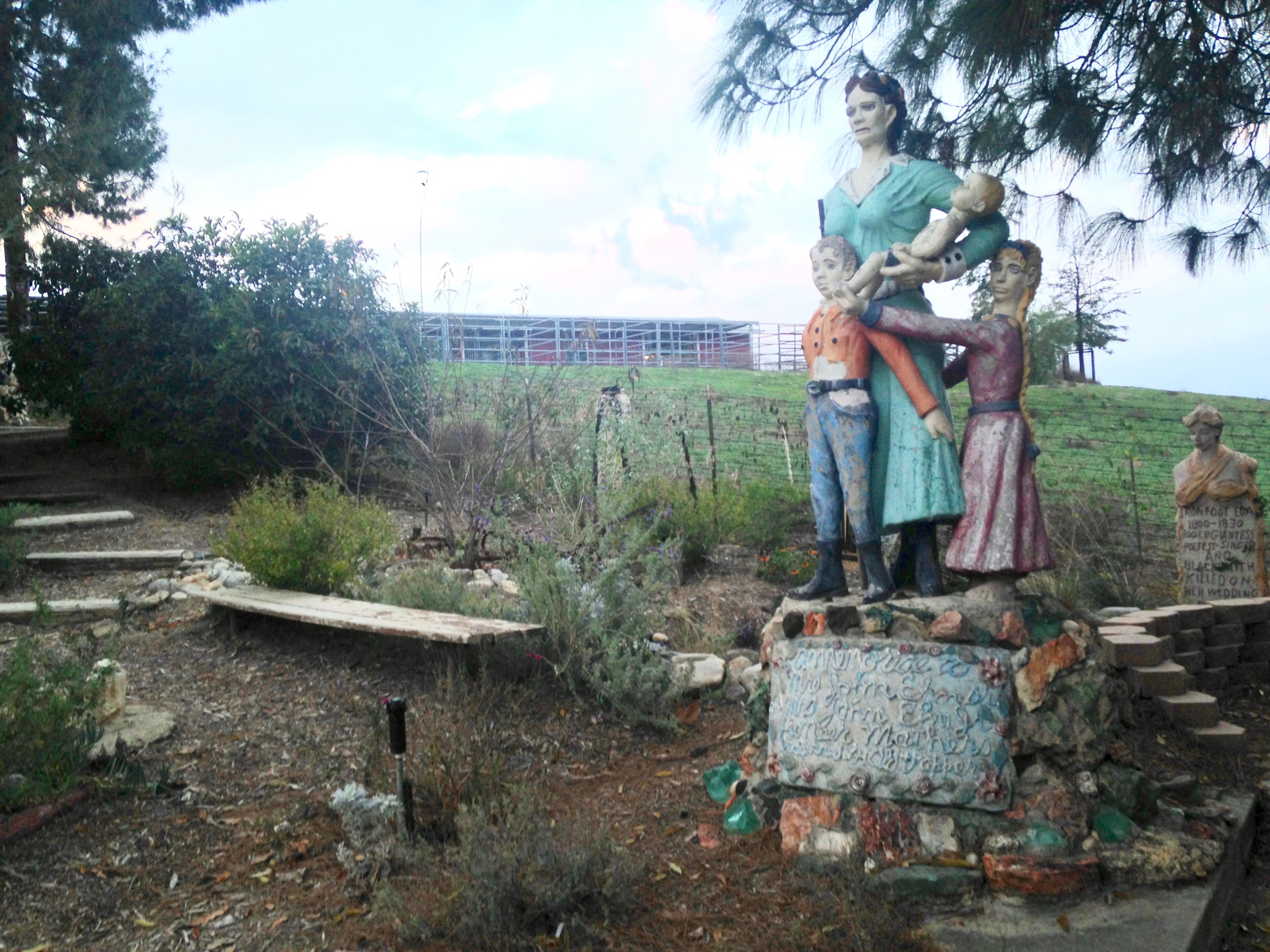

- Location within the Los Angeles metropolitan area Location within California Location within the United States
- 34°11′06″N 118°35′00″W
- Location: Los Angeles Pierce College

History
- Built: 1951 to 1981

Site notes
- Architect: John Ehn

California Historical Landmark
- Designated: March 25, 1985
- Reference no.: 939.5

The Old Trapper's Lodge is a California Folk Art display started in 1951 in the United States. It was designated a California Historical Landmark (No. 939-5) on March 25, 1985. The Old Trapper's Lodge art work is located in Los Angeles Pierce College's Cleveland Park at 6201 Winnetka Avenue in Woodland Hills, Los Angeles in Los Angeles County. The folk art is a life-size sculpture made by John Ehn (1897-1981), a self-taught artist who loved Old West culture. Ehn used his family as models and turned them into life-size outsider art Old West characters.

== History ==
The creator of The Old Trapper's Lodge, John Ehn, was born in 1897 into a temporary lodging camp outside Viola, Michigan. [ 1] Ehn left school in the 7th grade to care for his ailing father. It was said he worked a variety of jobs including: lumber mill, game warden, and trapper. In 1941, Ehn and his family moved to California. By this time Ehn was partially disabled, suffering from spinal inflammation. He opened a motel in Sun Valley called Old Trapper's Lodge. On the grounds of the motel, Ehn built a series of sculptures. Ehn was not a trained artist. However, after he commissioned a sculpture of himself by Claude Bell, a Californian theme park artist and sand sculptor, Ehn was inspired to use similar techniques. He drew inspiration from his family, and his passion for the Old West and it's mythology. There are 7 monumental sculptures in total. In 1981, Old Trappers Lodge became a registered California Historical Landmark. The registry singled-out the work as an example of "remarkable 20th century art". Ehn died shortly after, and his wife Mary died the next year. Their children ran the business until 1987, when the Burbank-Glendale-Pasadena Airport Authority bought the land to expand its runways. The Ehn family received a relocation settlement. The family worked with SPACES foundation (Saving and Preserving Arts and Cultural Environments) to place smaller sculptures in museums. The foundation also helped look for a place for the larger sculptures including the Boot Hill Cemetery sculpture. In 1988, an agreement, under the tutelage of then college president David Wolf, was made for Pierce College to place Old Trapper's Lodge on the campus in Alvin Cleveland Park. Under the agreement Pierce College would receive the sculptures as a loan and would maintain them.

== Controversy ==
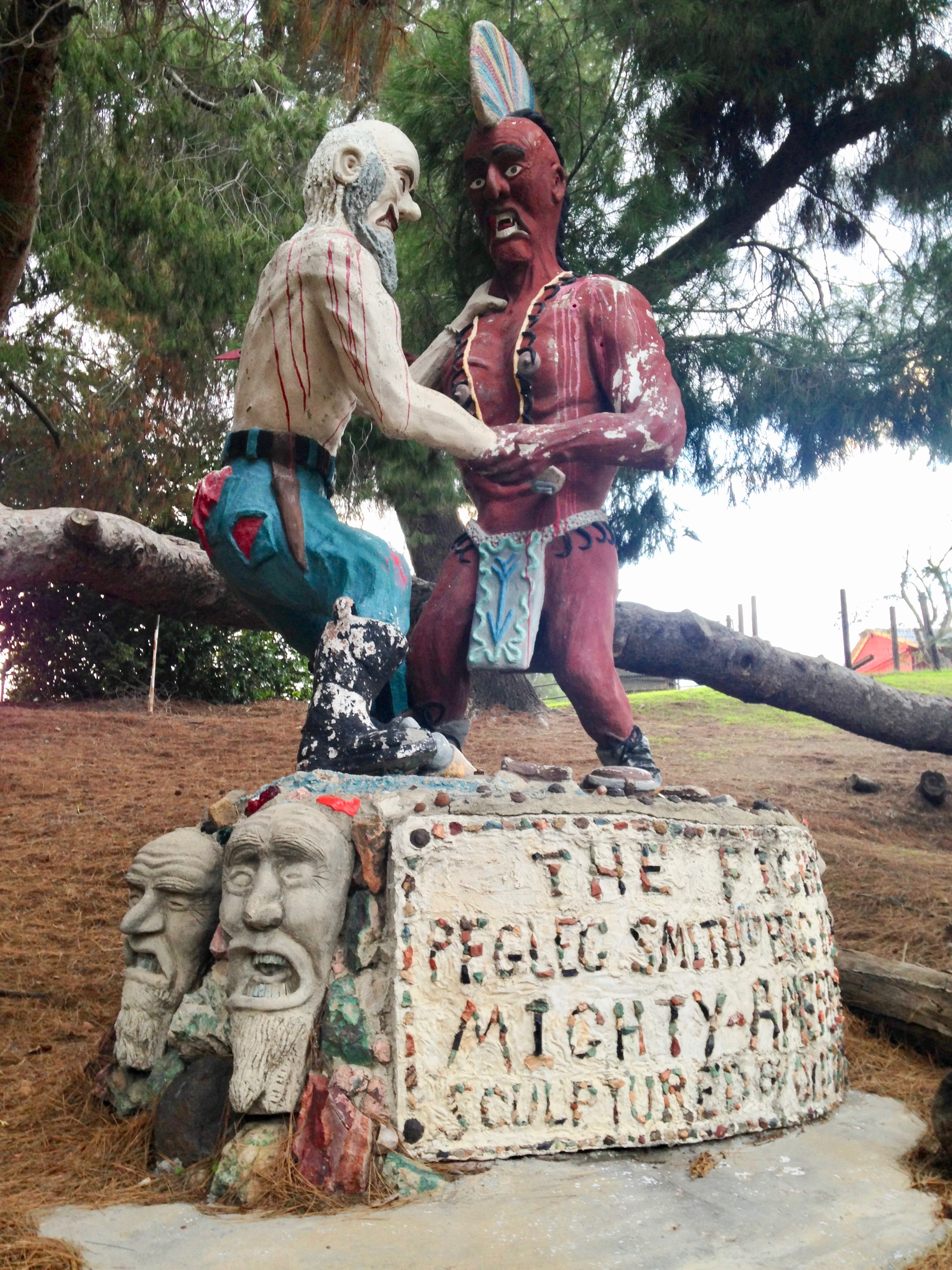
A red-skinned Native American and a white settler wrangle. There has been some public disdain for this and other parts of Old Trapper's Lodge.

Over the years the Ehn family relocated out of the area, and the administration at the college changed. The sculptures remained in a part of the campus known as Alvin Cleveland Park, but little was done to maintain them. In 2020, an arising of protests and disdain for public monuments commemorating racial subjugation took hold across the country. Professor James McKeever, a faculty member at Pierce College, led an effort to bring awareness to the sculpture's misrepresentation of Native Americans and other distorted portrayals of the "Wild West". McKeever said that nine years prior, a student mentioned the sculptures, and together with his social justice group consisting of Black, Latino, and Indigenous students, they set on path to remove the sculptures. The students agreed that the narrative the sculptures portrayed were racist and offensive by today's social standards.

== State Marker 939-5 ==
Several California Historical Landmarks share the number 939 — “Twentieth Century Folk Art Environments (Thematic)”. The plaque on the site reads:

- No. 939 Twentieth Century Folk Art Environments (Thematic) - OLD TRAPPER'S LODGE - Old Trapper's Lodge is one of California's remarkable Twentieth Century Folk Art Environments. It represents the life work of John Ehn (1897-1981), a self-taught artist who wished to pass on a sense of the Old West, derived from personal experiences, myths, and tall tales. From 1951 to 1981, using his family as models, and incorporating memorabilia, the 'Old Trapper' followed his dreams and visions to create the Lodge and its 'Boot Hill.'

== Gallery ==
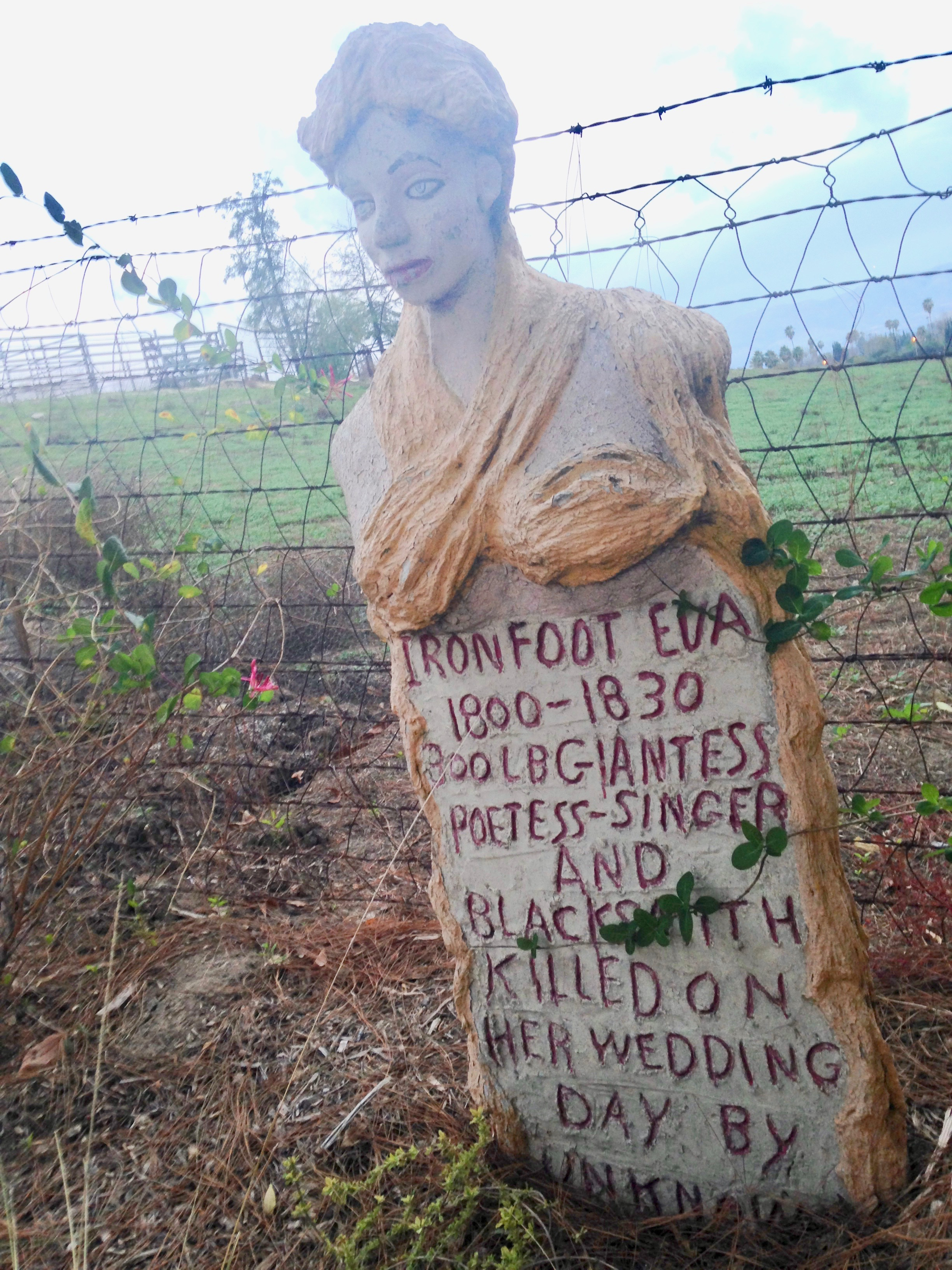

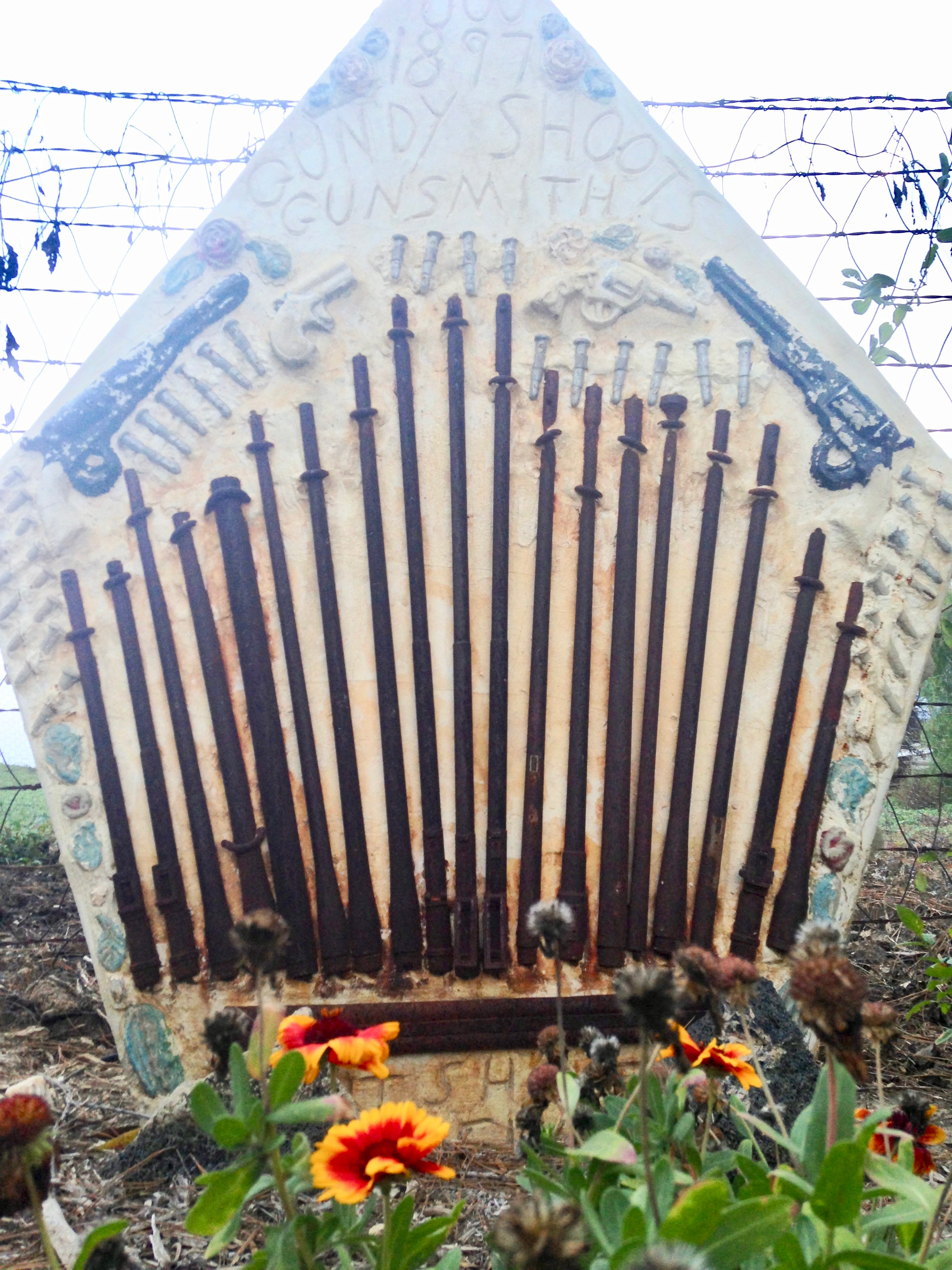

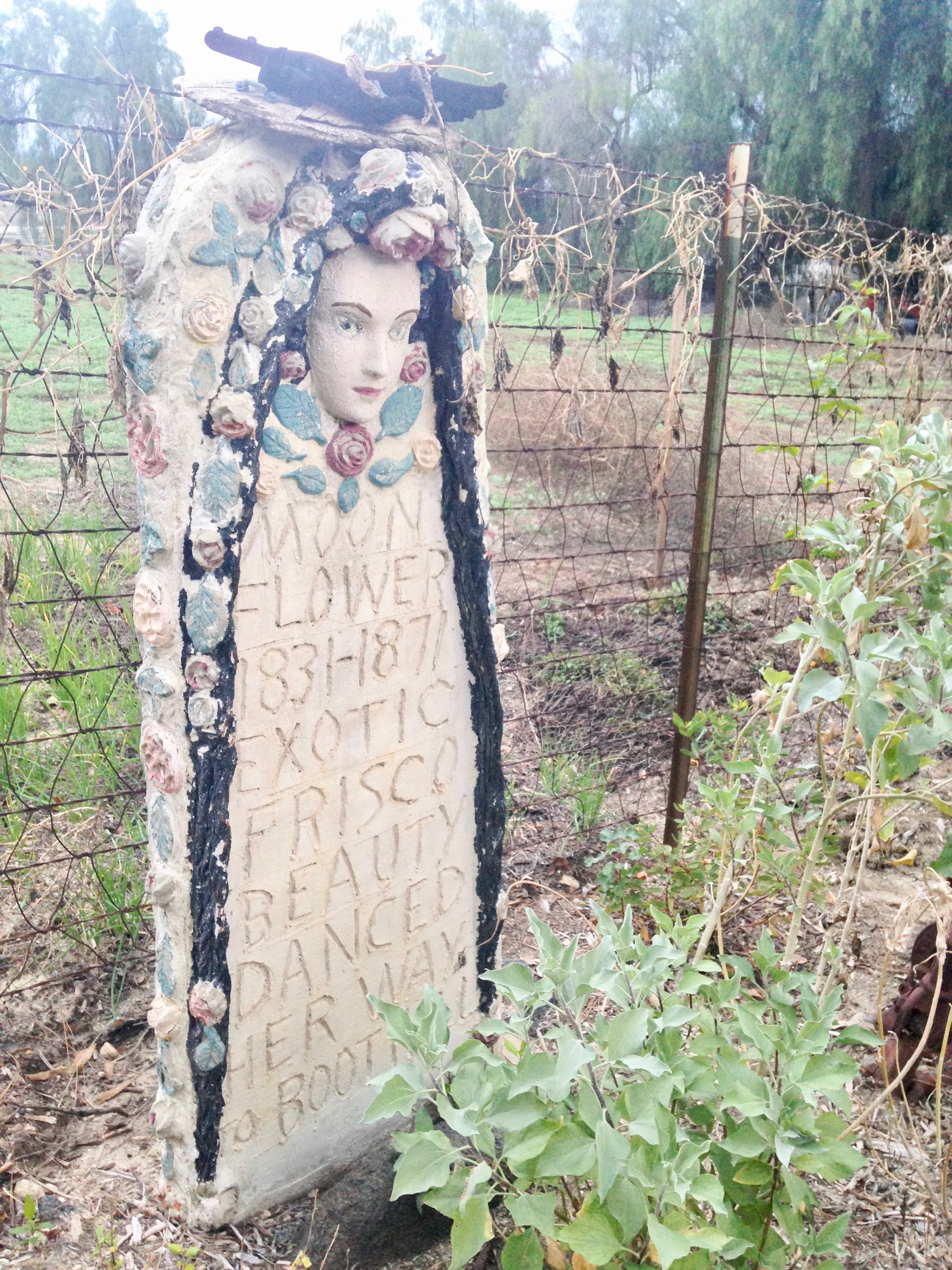

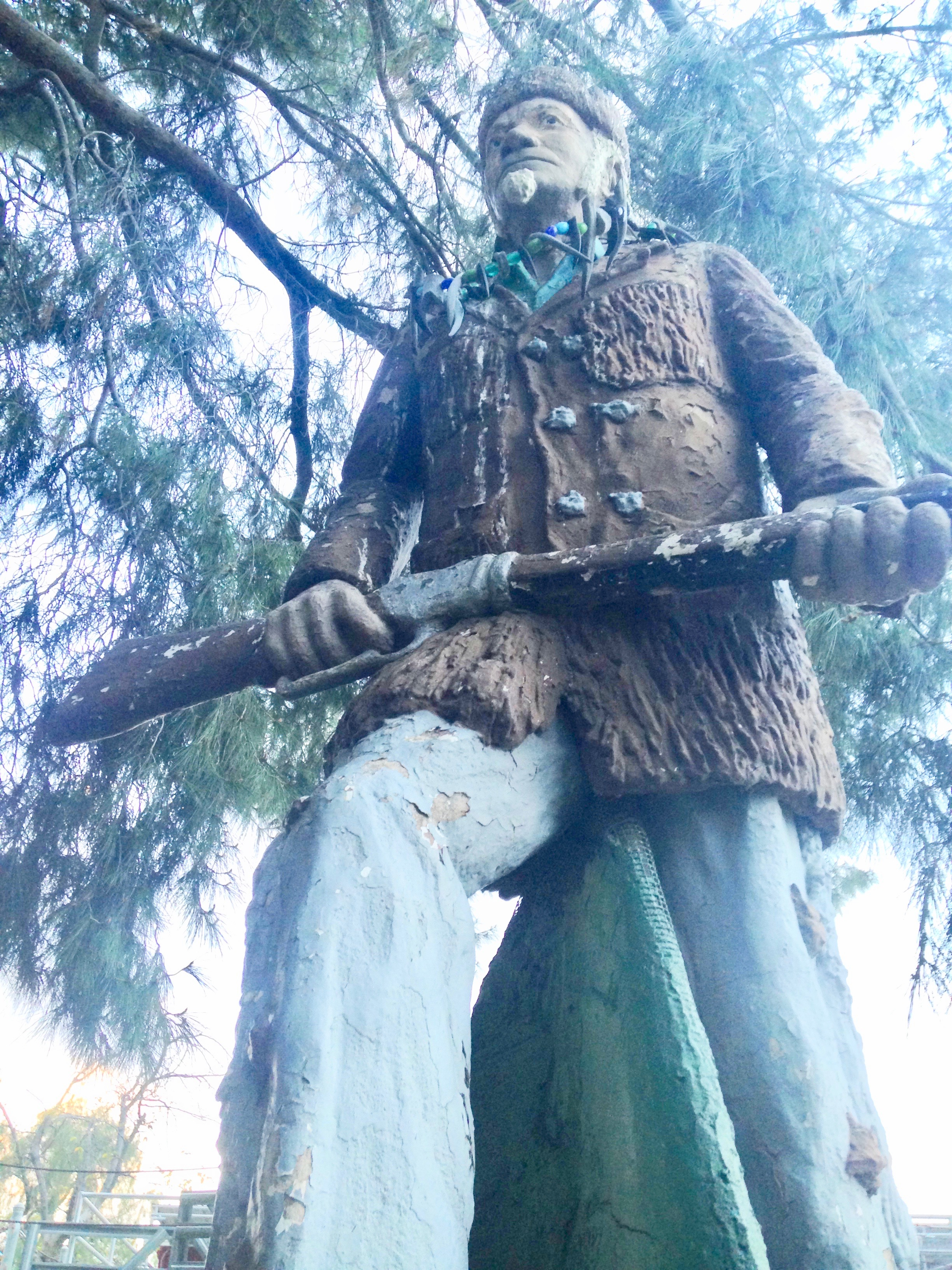

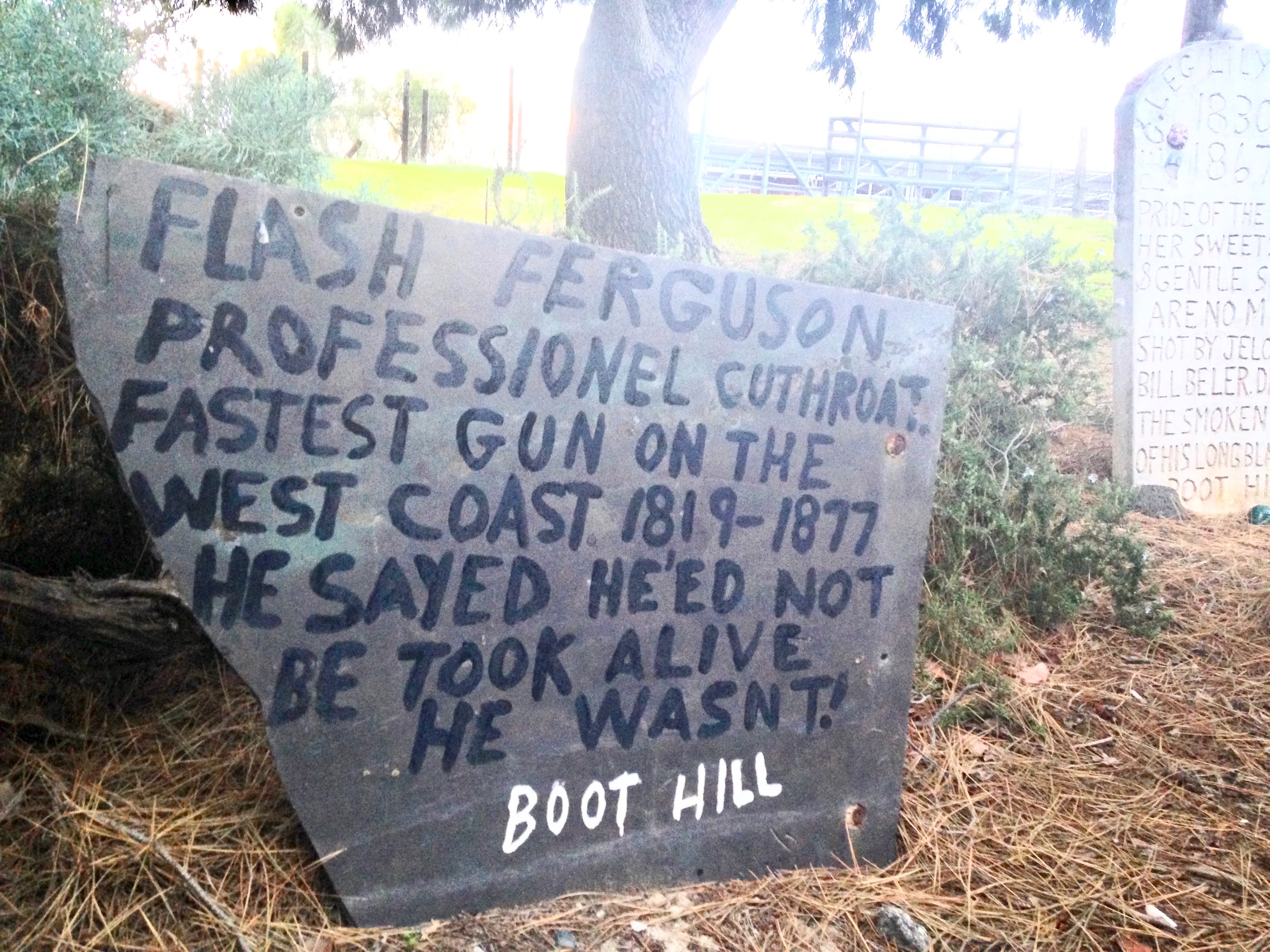

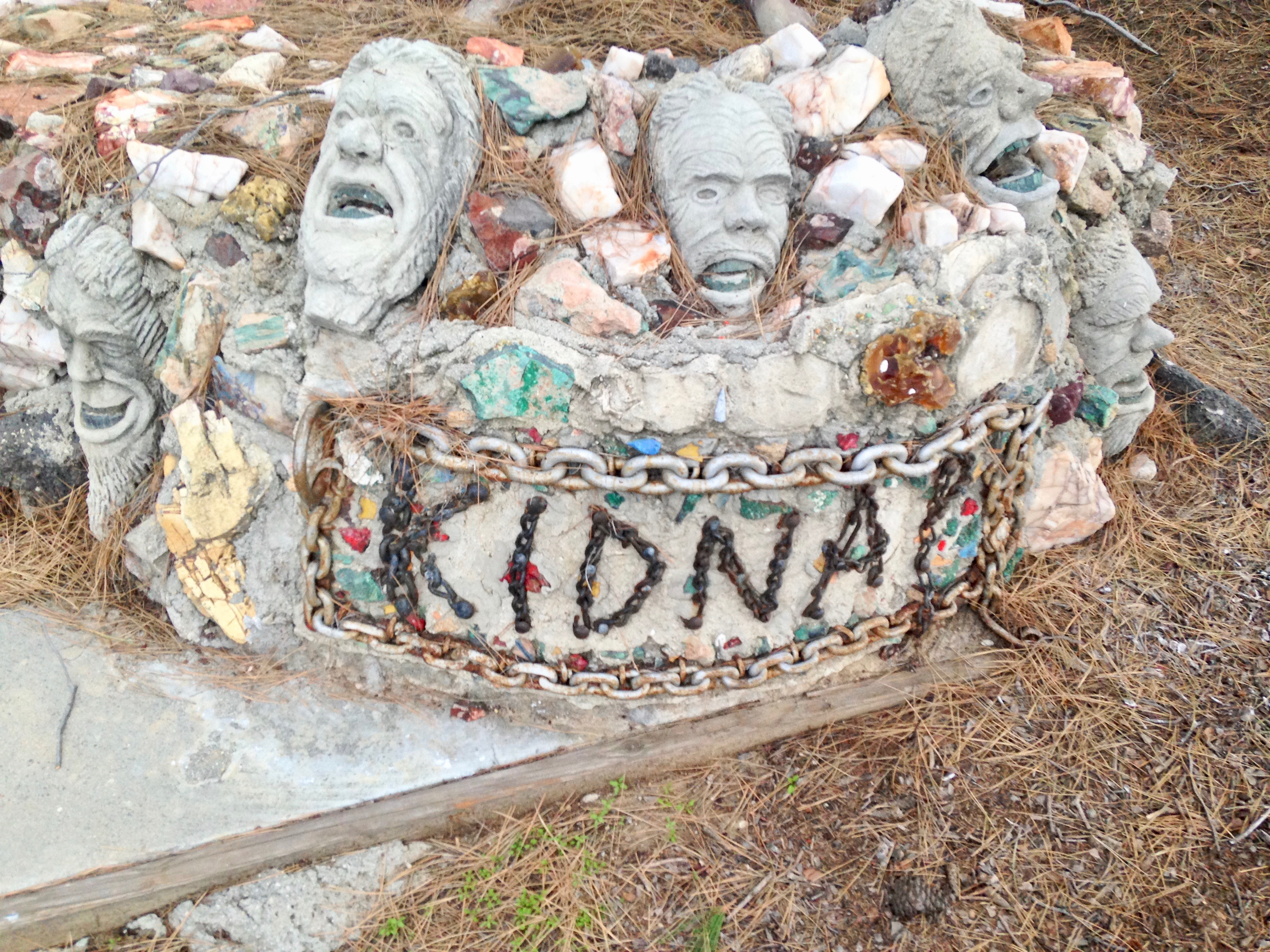

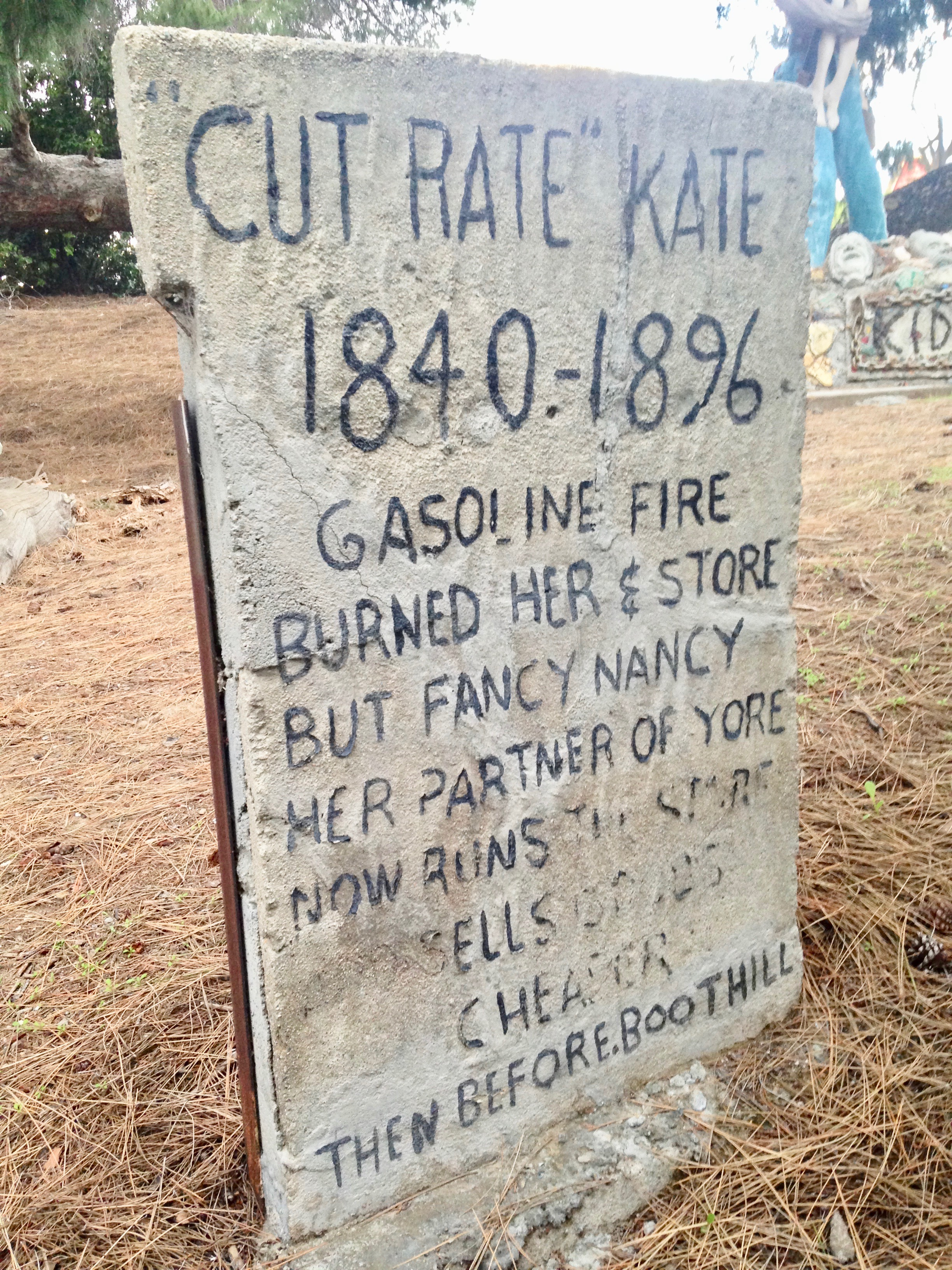

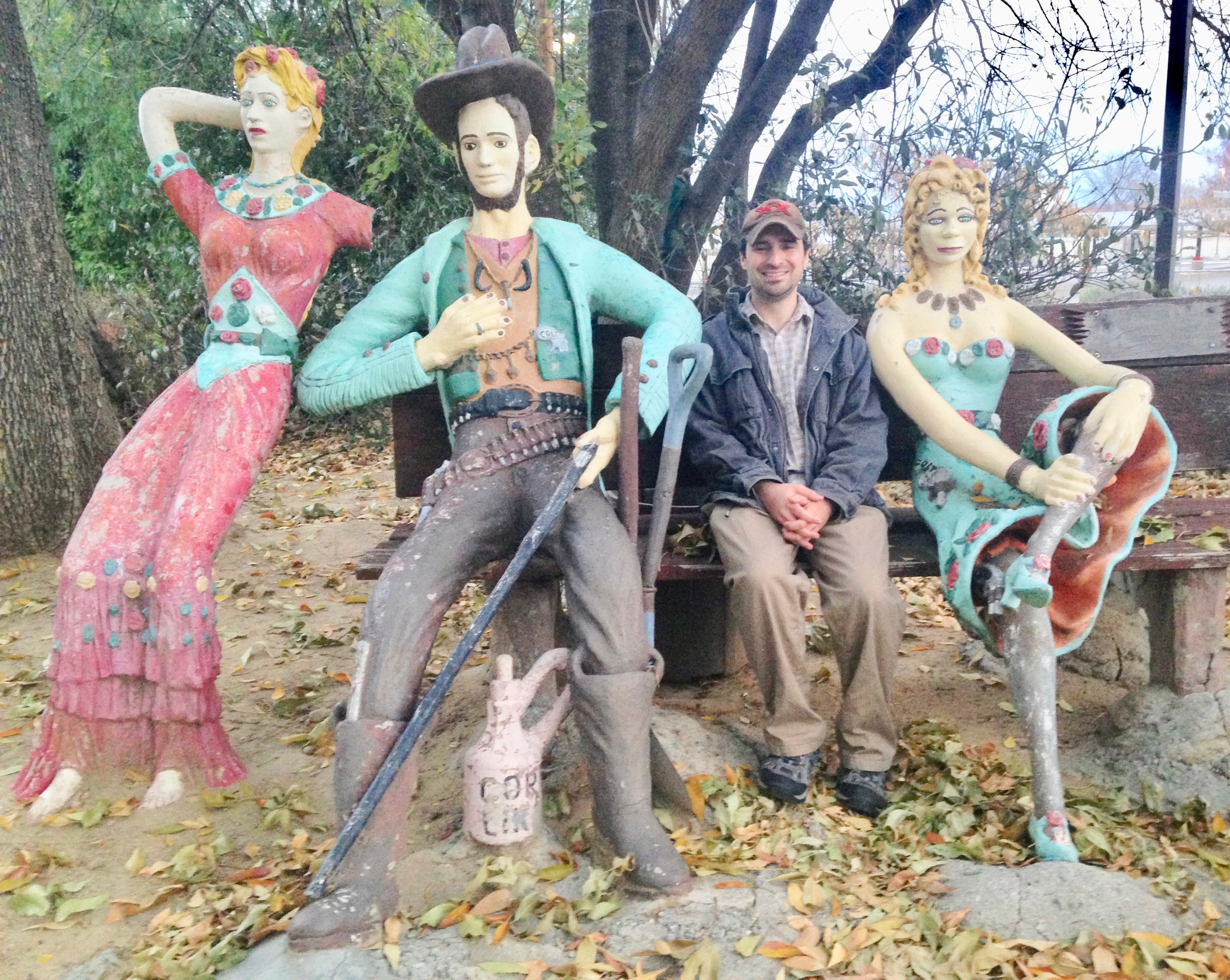

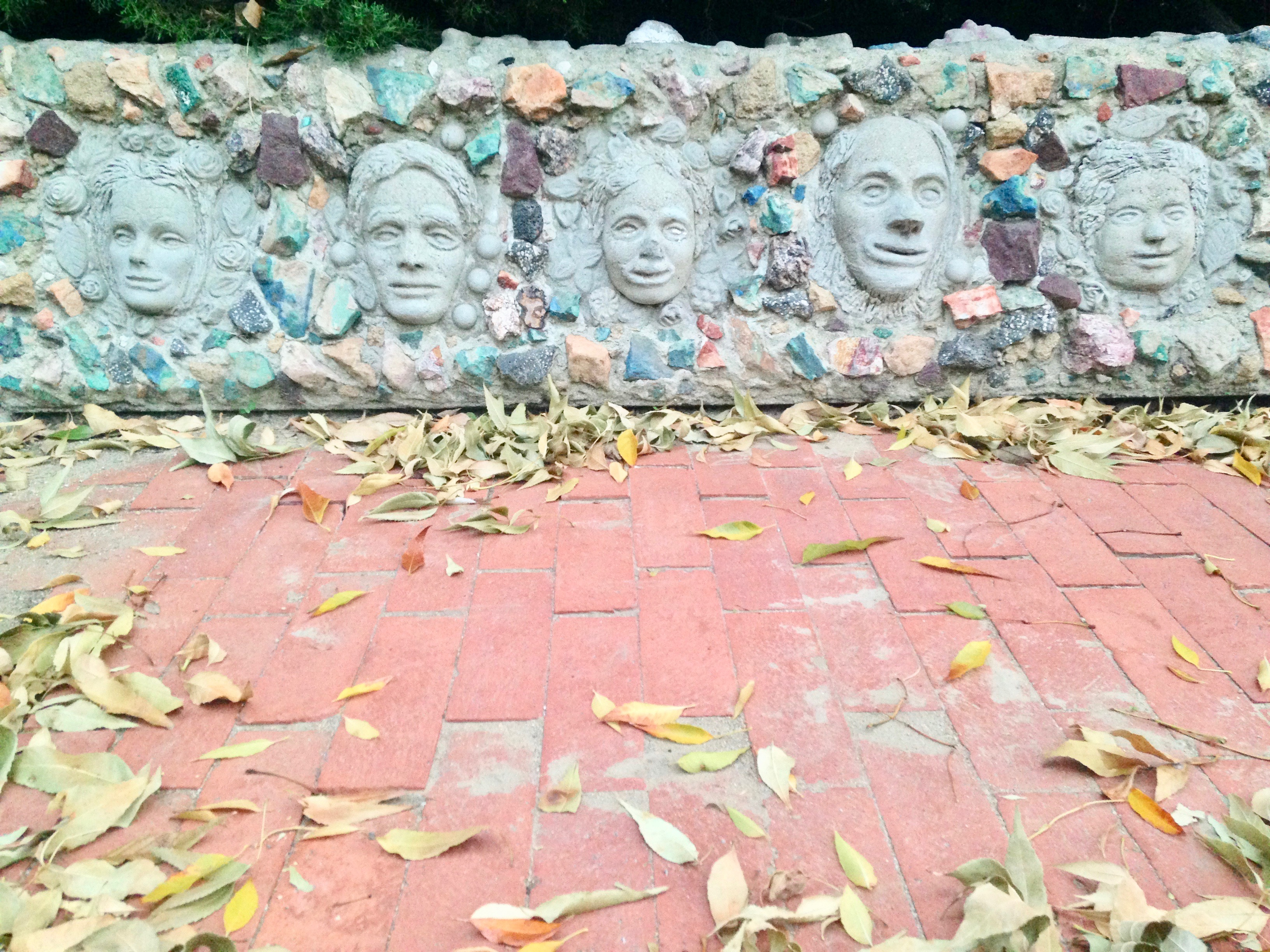

== See also ==
- California Historical Landmarks in Los Angeles County
