= Minnette Gersh Lenier =

American teacher, magician

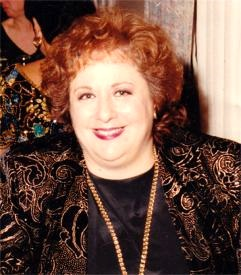
- Born: July 9, 1945; Atlanta, Georgia
- Died: February 7, 2011 (aged 65); Woodland Hills, Los Angeles, California
- Occupations: Teacher, Magician
- Known for: using stage magic to teach reading and learning skills
- Spouse: Jules Lenier (1976–1980)

Minnette Ella Gersh Lenier (July 9, 1945 in Atlanta, Georgia – February 7, 2011 in Woodland Hills, Los Angeles, California) was a teacher and professional magician who used stage magic to improve students' reading and learning skills.

== Education and career ==
Minnette Lenier received a Bachelor of Arts in 1967 from San Fernando Valley State College, and was a Graduate Student at the University of Southern California. She received a Master of Arts in 1968 from the University of Iowa, and a PhD in 1971 from the University of Southern California, with a thesis entitled Theodore Roosevelt's Communication Strategies In The Presidential Campaign Of 1912. As a reading specialist, Lenier worked with students at Compton Community College and at other Southeast Los Angeles area schools, as well as in the Los Angeles Unified School District. Lenier was on the faculty of Los Angeles Pierce College.

== Magician ==
Lenier began taking magic lessons in 1966 with the magician Jules Lenier (1929–2007), whom she later married. She performed professionally, often at the Magic Castle, earned over half her living through magic, and had the distinction of being one of the few female performing magicians.

== Teaching literacy ==
Minnette Lenier used stage magic in the classroom to elevate student interest in the subject matter and worked mostly with remedial reading students. Lenier's stage magic, a concrete task, showed students that everyone has perceptual difficulties at times and that misperception can even bring enjoyment. Lenier gave optical illusions to everyone in class to examine, and would then discuss how people are fooled in general, and how the problems students have in reading could be solved. Lenier proved to students that to be fooled is not to be stupid. She allowed students to bring the illusions home so they could try them on other people to demonstrate that everyone is occasionally deceived by their eyes. Lenier noted that this also gives students the opportunity to be successful with others because they have the correct answers to the illusions. Lenier used magic not only with remedial students, but with gifted students as well. These students are often bored in their classes and Lenier discovered that learning magic is a mind-expanding activity for them.

Minnette Lenier died suddenly of cardiac arrest in her home in Woodland Hills, California on February 7, 2011.

== Bibliography ==
- Keys to a powerful vocabulary. Prentice Hall. 1993. ISBN 0-13-668955-8. (with Janet Maker)
- Academic reading with active critical thinking. Wadsworth Pub. Co. 1996. ISBN 0-534-22020-7. (with Janet Maker)
- College reading with active critical thinking. Wadsworth Pub. Co. 1997. ISBN 0-534-26472-7. (with Janet Maker)
- Keys to college success: Reading and study improvement. Prentice Hall. 1998. ISBN 0-13-270935-X. (with Janet Maker)
