= Old Short Cut =

California historic landmark

Old Short Cut Ranger Station
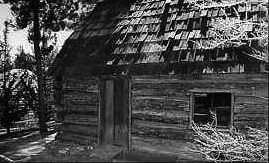
- Old Short Cut Ranger Station Cabin

- Location within the Los Angeles metropolitan area
- 34°19′37″N 118°00′22″W
- Location: Chilao Visitor Center in the Angeles National Forest

History
- Built: 1900

California Historical Landmark
- Designated: March 3, 1958
- Reference no.: 632

The Old Short Cut or Old Short Cut Cabin or Old Short Cut Ranger Station or the West Fork Ranger Station is California's first ranger station, built in 1900. The Old Short Cut Cabin was designated a California Historic Landmark (No.632) on March 3, 1958. The Short Cut Cabin is located is in what is now the Angeles National Forest in the San Gabriel Mountains of Los Angeles County. The name Old Short Cut Cabin comes from Short Cut Canyon Trail, the cabin was a popular stopping spot on the trail. The Old Short Cut Cabin was built by forest service men Louie Newcomb and Phillip Begue. At the time of construction in 1900, the forest was called the Gabriel Timberland Reserve. In 1907 the forest was renamed the San Gabriel National Forest. In 1908 it was renamed again to its current name to Angeles National Forest. The San Gabriel Forest Reserve was established on December 20, 1892. The Old Short Cut Cabin was constructed where Shortcut Canyon joins the West Fork of the San Gabriel River Canyon. The Cabin was restored and move to the United States Forest Service's Chilao Visitor Center in the 1980s just off Angeles Crest Highway.

== Marker ==
The marker on the site reads:

- NO. 632 OLD SHORT CUT – This is California's first ranger station, built in 1900 by Louie Newcomb and Phillip Begue, early Forest Service men. The cabin took its name from the 'Short Cut Canyon Trail,' as the cabin was one of the main stopping points on this trail.

== See also ==
- California Historical Landmarks in Los Angeles County
- Vetter Mountain
