= Western Hotel (Lancaster, California) =

Building in Lancaster, California, United States

Lancaster Western Hotel
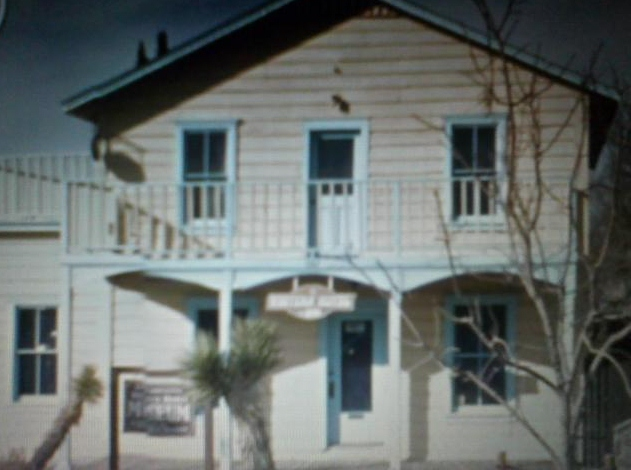
- The building's exterior in 2012

- Location within the Los Angeles metropolitan area
- 34°41′54″N 118°08′21″W
- Location: 557 W Lancaster Boulevard; Lancaster, California, U.S.

History
- Built: 1876

California Historical Landmark
- Designated: September 26, 1958
- Reference no.: 658

The Western Hotel is a hotel built in 1888 by the Gilroy family. It is the oldest surviving building in Lancaster, California. The Western Hotel was designated a California Historic Landmark (No.658) on September 26, 1958. The Western Hotel is located at 557 West Lancaster Boulevard, Lancaster, California, in Los Angeles County. George T. Webber purchased the hotel and ran it as the Western Hotel. The hotel was built on a train stop that was built in 1876 by the Southern Pacific railroad. The line ran through the Antelope Valley, linking San Francisco to Los Angeles. The hotel's large dining room became the meeting spot for the city. In the dining room: The Lancaster Chamber of Commerce was started, church socials held, quilting bees meetings, card parties, civic club meetings, and many Lancaster business meetings. While the Los Angeles-Owens River Aqueduct was being built, many of the construction crews were housed in the hotel from 1905 to 1913. The hotel was damaged by fire in 1972 and not repaired. It was in danger of being condemned and razed when, in 1974, Tri Robinson's eighth grade class at Park View Intermediate School decided that saving the hotel was worthwhile. The students met with local civic groups and The Western Hotel Historical Society was born. The Western Hotel in 1992 was remodeled to a small museum and offers free tours.

== California Historic Landmark Marker ==
Marker on the site reads:

- N0. 658 WESTERN HOTEL – Erected by the Gilroy family in 1876, this building was purchased in 1902 by George T. Webber, who operated it as the Western Hotel. The Lancaster Chamber of Commerce was organized in its dining room. Between 1905 and 1913, construction crews of the Los Angeles-Owens River Aqueduct were housed here, and it became a center of commercial and social activity in the early life of the community.

== See also ==
- California Historical Landmarks in Los Angeles County
