= Edwin C. Norton =

American academic

Edwin Clarence Norton (July 5, 1856 – October 6, 1943) was an American academic. He was the first dean of Pomona College, where he worked from 1888 to 1926.
