= Philip Treisman =

American mathematician

Philip Uri Treisman is an American mathematician and mathematics educator. He is the Director of the Charles A. Dana Center, and is a Professor of Mathematics at The University of Texas at Austin. He developed the Emerging Scholars Program (ESP), aimed at helping students from groups that are underrepresented in mathematics, science and engineering excel in calculus and other courses in science. The program was first implemented at the University of California, Berkeley and has now disseminated throughout college campuses across the United States. His efforts to improve American education have been recognized by Newsweek, the Harvard Foundation and the MacArthur Foundation, among other publications and societies. He is a Fellow of the American Association for the Advancement of Science.

He graduated summa cum laude with a B.S. in Mathematics from the University of California, Los Angeles, and from the University of California, Berkeley with a Ph.D. in 1985.

== Awards ==
- 1987 Charles A. Dana Award for Pioneering Achievement in American Higher Education
- 1992 MacArthur Fellow
- 2006 The Harvard Foundation's Scientist of the Year Award
- 2016 Mathematics Leadership Excellence Award, American Mathematical Association of Two-Year Colleges
- 2019 Yueh-Gin Gung and Dr. Charles Y. Hu Award for Distinguished Service to Mathematics, Mathematical Association of America
- 2020 James Bryant Conant Award, Education Commission of the States
