= Sepúlveda family of California =

Influential Los Angeles rancheros

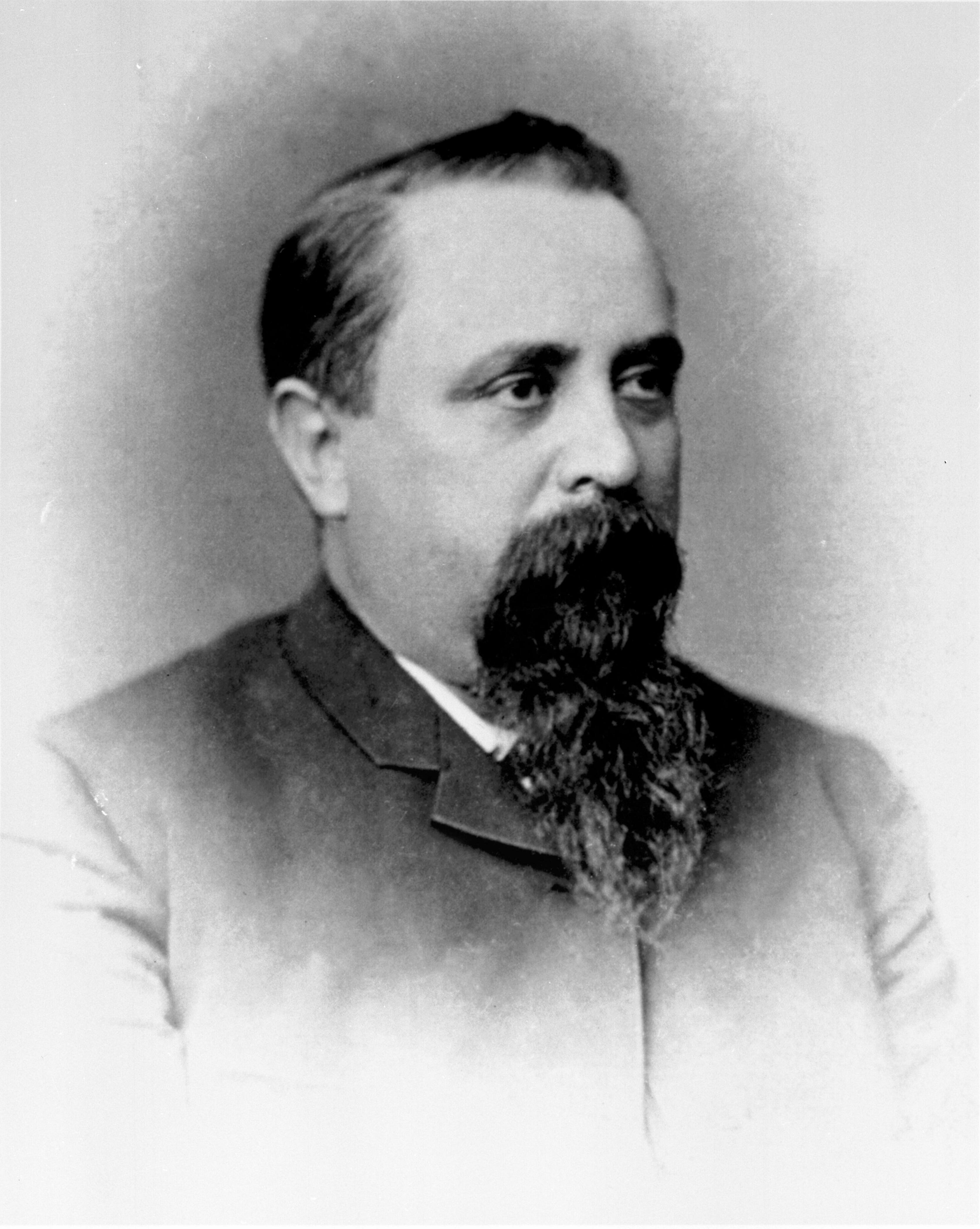
Ygnacio Sepúlveda served as a California State Assemblyman and judge of the Los Angeles County Superior Court.

The Sepúlveda family is a prominent Californio family of Southern California. Members of the family held extensive rancho grants and numerous important positions, including Alcalde de Los Ángeles (Mayor of Los Angeles), California State Assemblymen, and Los Angeles County Supervisor.

== Notable members ==
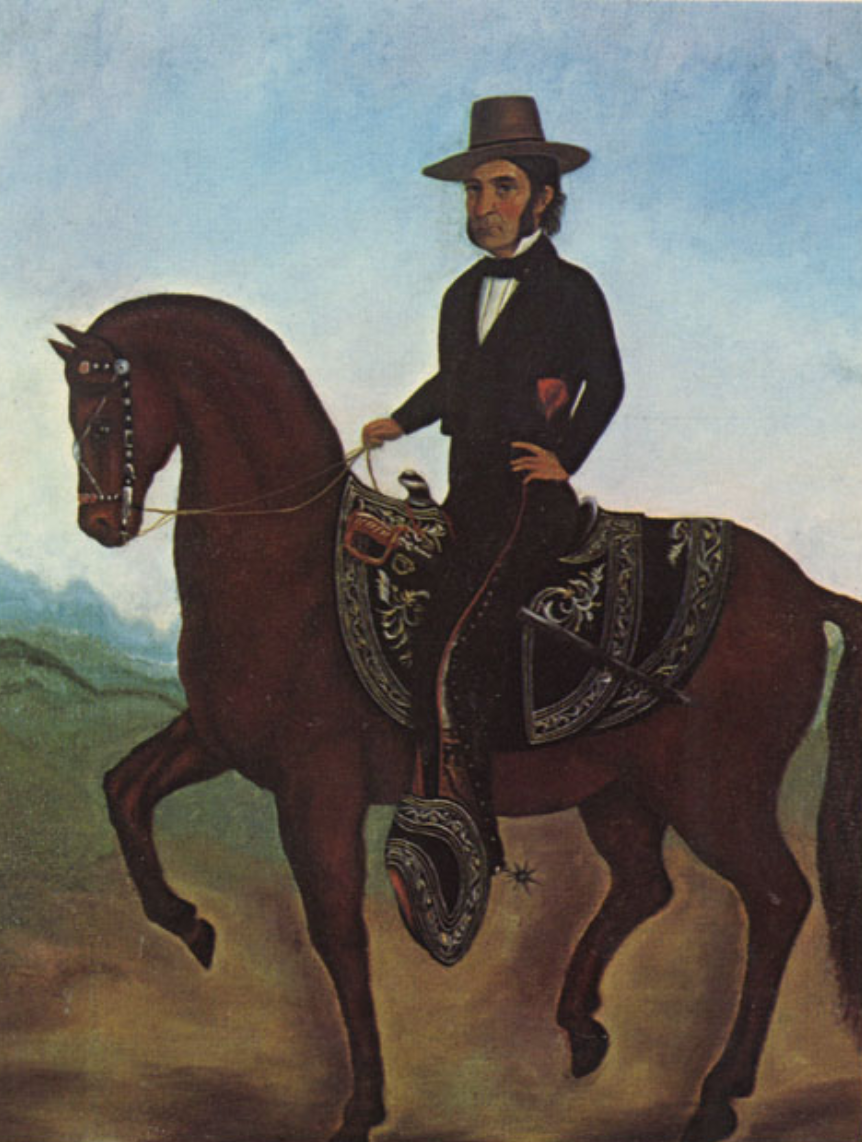
José Andrés Sepúlveda, grantee of Rancho San Joaquín & Rancho Santiago de Santa Ana, and famed vaquero.

=== Francisco Xavier Sepúlveda ===
Francisco Xavier Sepúlveda, born in 1747, is the founder of the family. He married María Candelaria de Redondo in 1762; they had six children. He came to California in 1781, as part a military regiment under the leadership of the José de Züñiga. He served as a military escort for settlers arriving to the Pueblo de Los Ángeles as part of the efforts led by Fernando Rivera y Moncada, former Governor of the Californias. Subsequently, he settled in San Diego, serving at the Presidio of San Diego from 1781 to 1786. After retiring from military service, he settled in Los Angeles. He died in 1788 and is buried at Mission San Gabriel Arcángel.

=== Juan José Sepúlveda ===
Juan José Sepúlveda was born in 1764, as the eldest son of Francisco Xavier Sepúlveda and María Candelaria de Redondo. He married Tomasa Gutiérrez at Mission San Juan Capistrano in 1786, with whom he had three children. Following Gutiérrez's death, Sepúlveda remarried to Mariana Díaz Lorenzana in 1804 at Mission San Diego de Alcalá. He served as a soldier at the Presidio of San Diego from the mid-1790s until 1802, when he was transferred to Mission San Gabriel Arcángel. He retired and died in 1808, in San Gabriel and was buried at the mission.

=== Francisco Sepúlveda II ===
Francisco Sepúlveda II was born in 1775, as the youngest son of Francisco Xavier Sepúlveda and María Candelaria de Redondo. He married María Teodora Ramona Serrano in 1802 at Mission San Diego de Alcalá. In 1831, he participated in the uprising against Manuel Victoria, then Governor of Alta California, and was subsequently imprisoned. Francisco served as commissioner of Mission San Juan Capistrano between 1836 and 1837. Governor Juan Bautista Alvarado granted him Rancho San Vicente y Santa Monica in 1839.

=== José Dolores Sepúlveda ===
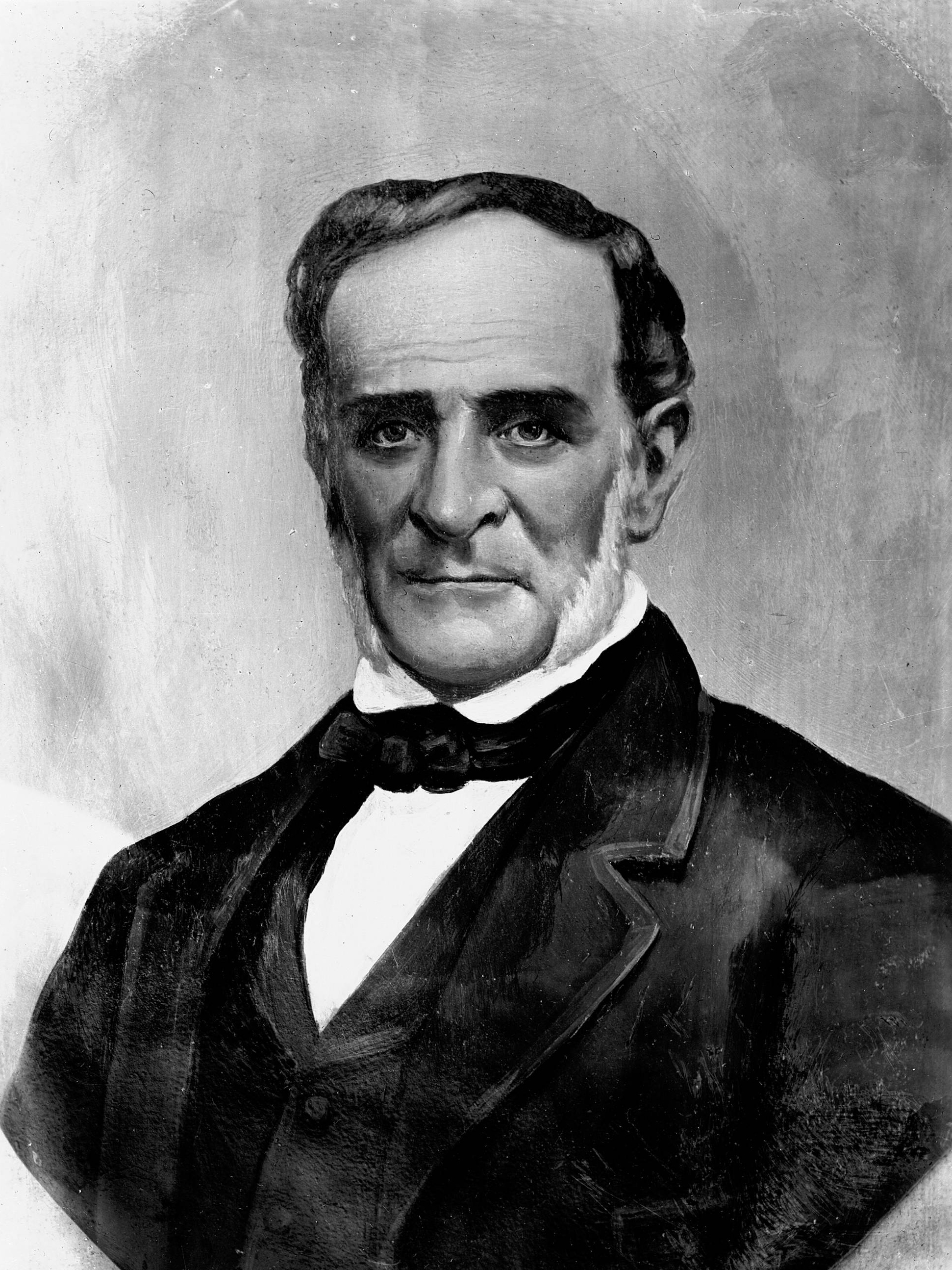
José Loreto Sepúlveda, who served as Alcalde of Los Angeles.

José Dolores Sepúlveda was born in 1793, to Juan José Sepúlveda and Tomasa Gutiérrez. Beginning in 1810, he began his life as a ranchero, having been granted permission to herd livestock on Rancho San Pedro. José Dolores Sepúlveda married María Ignacia Marcia Ávila in 1813 at Mission San Gabriel Arcángel. Beginning in 1810, he began to herd his livestock on Rancho San Pedro; this formed the basis for the Sepúlveda family's claim to the rancho. In 1824, he travelled to Monterey to plead his case before Governor Luis Antonio Argüello. On his voyage back to Los Angeles, he was killed at Mission La Purísima Concepción, during the Chumash Revolt of 1824. In 1834, ten years after his death, Governor José Figueroa made a ruling in the land claim for Rancho San Pedro, awarding José Dolores's sons, Juan Capistrano and José Loreto, the Rancho de los Palos Verdes. The José Dolores Sepúlveda Adobe in Torrance is a California Historical Landmark.

=== Juan María Sepúlveda ===
Juan María Sepúlveda was born in 1824 in Los Angeles, to Francisco Sepúlveda II and María Teodora Ramona Serrano. He served as the 2nd Los Angeles County Assessor, from 1857 to 1858. He was elected as a member of the Los Angeles Common Council, serving from 1853 to 1854. He was married to María de Jesus Alvarado, a member of the Pico family. He died in 1868 in Los Angeles.

=== Juan Capistrano Sepúlveda ===
Juan Capistrano Sepúlveda was born in 1814 in San Gabriel, to José Dolores Sepúlveda and María Ignacia Marcia Ávila. He served as a member of the Los Angeles County Board of Supervisors in 1854 for the 3rd district. He served as Vice-Alcalde of Los Angeles (vice-mayor) in 1845. He was granted Rancho de los Palos Verdes, in conjunction with his brother José Loreto, by Governor Pío Pico in 1846.

=== José Loreto Sepúlveda ===
José Loreto Sepúlveda was born in 1815 in Los Angeles, to José Dolores Sepúlveda and María Ignacia Marcia Ávila. He was granted Rancho de los Palos Verdes, in conjunction with his brother Juan Capistrano, by Governor Pío Pico in 1846. He served one term as Alcalde of Los Angeles (mayor), in 1837, and four terms as Vice-Alcalde of Los Angeles (vice-mayor), in 1839 to 1840, 1842, 1846, and 1848.

=== Ygnacio Sepúlveda ===
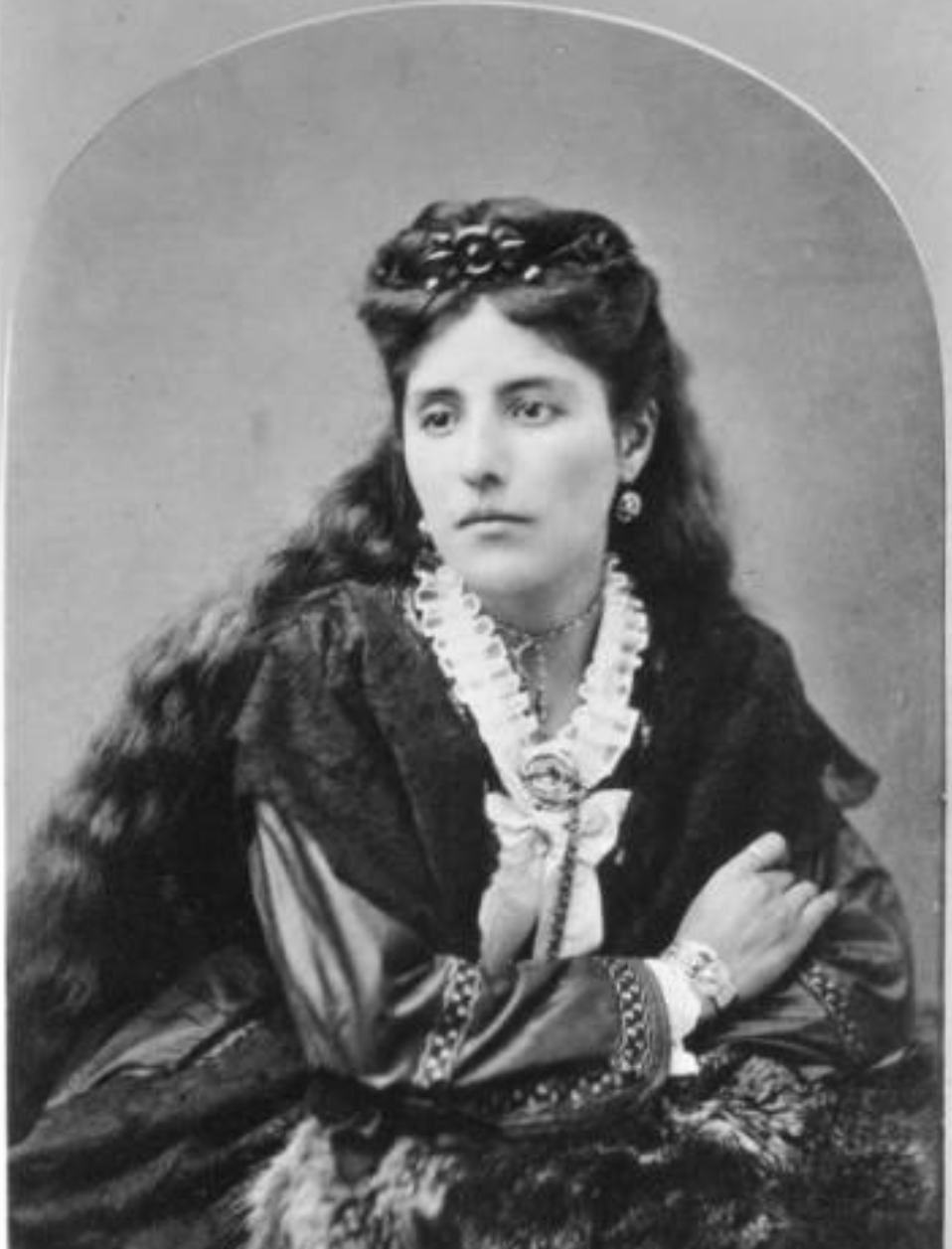
Rudecinda Sepúlveda de Dodson, pioneer of San Pedro, California and a founder of the San Pedro Woman's Club.

Ygnacio Sepúlveda was born in 1842 in Los Angeles, to José Andrés Sepúlveda and María Francisca Paula Ávila y Ruíz. In 1863, he was admitted to the California State Bar. He was elected as a member of the California State Assembly, serving from 1863 to 1865. He was subsequently elected as a Los Angeles County Judge in 1869 and then as a District Judge in 1874. He served on the first board of directors of the Los Angeles Public Library in 1872. He became a judge of the Los Angeles County Superior Court in 1879, serving until 1884. In 1895, President Cleveland appointed him as Chargé d'Affaires of the United States to Mexico, which he served as until 1897. He died in 1916 and is buried at Mission Santa Barbara.

=== Other members ===
- José Enrique Anselmo Sepúlveda, grantee of Rancho San Pascual
- Diego Sepúlveda, grantee of Rancho San Bernardino and builder of the Diego Sepúlveda Adobe
- José Andrés Sepúlveda, owner of Rancho San Joaquín & Rancho Santiago de Santa Ana and famed vaquero
- Fernando Domingo Sepúlveda, grantee of Rancho San Rafael and namesake of Sepulveda, California
- Vicenta Sepúlveda, owner of Rancho La Sierra and Rancho Valle de San José
- José Santos Sepúlveda, donating collector to the Autry Museum of the American West
- Rudecinda Florencia Sepúlveda de Dodson (who married James H. Dodson, the son of Arthur McKenzie Dodson), a founder of the San Pedro Woman's Club, a pioneer of San Pedro, California, and honored by the naming of Rudecinda Sepulveda Dodson Middle School and the Native Daughters of the Golden West parlor No. 230 "Rudecinda".

== Legacy ==
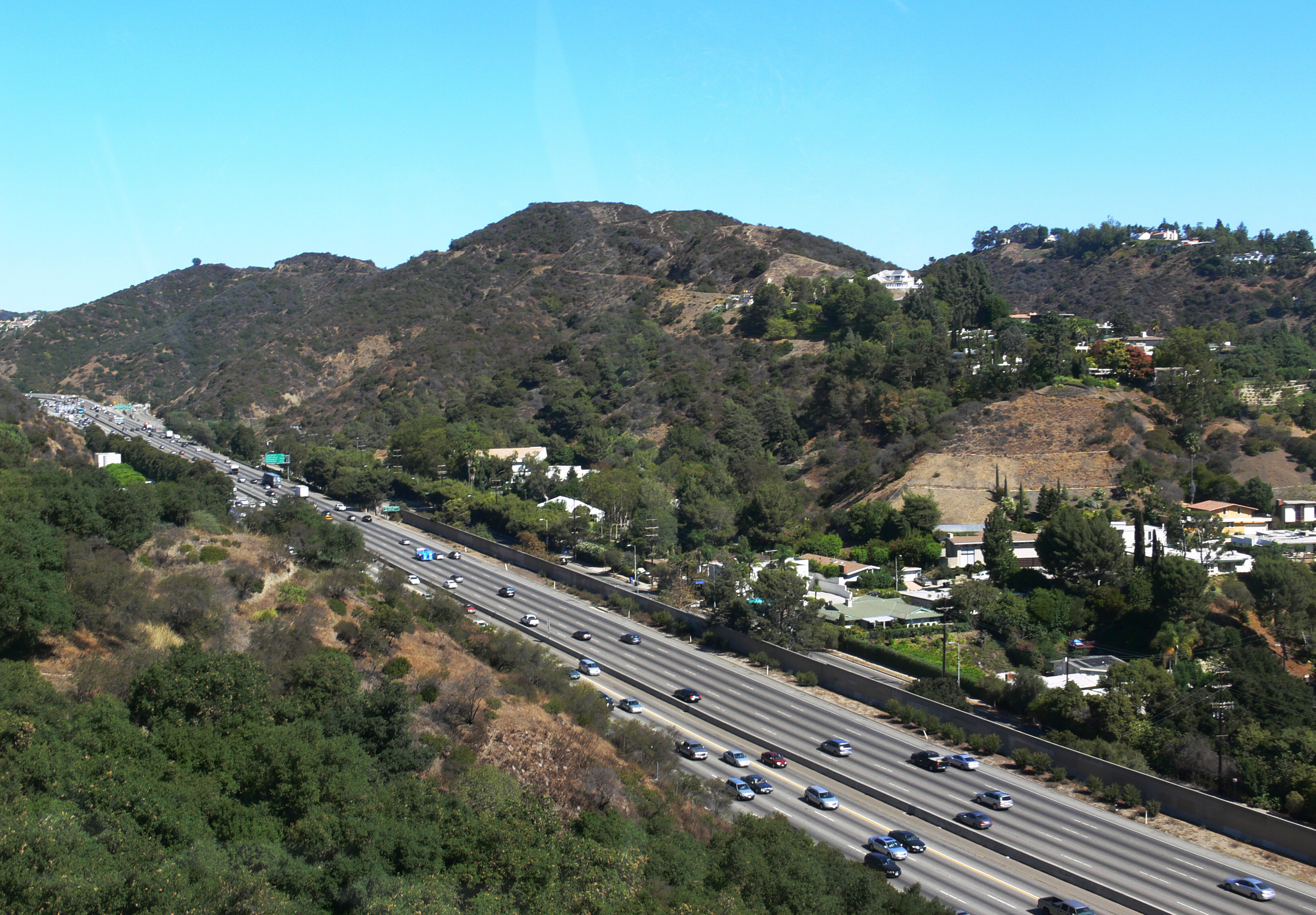
Sepulveda Pass, in the Santa Monica Mountains.

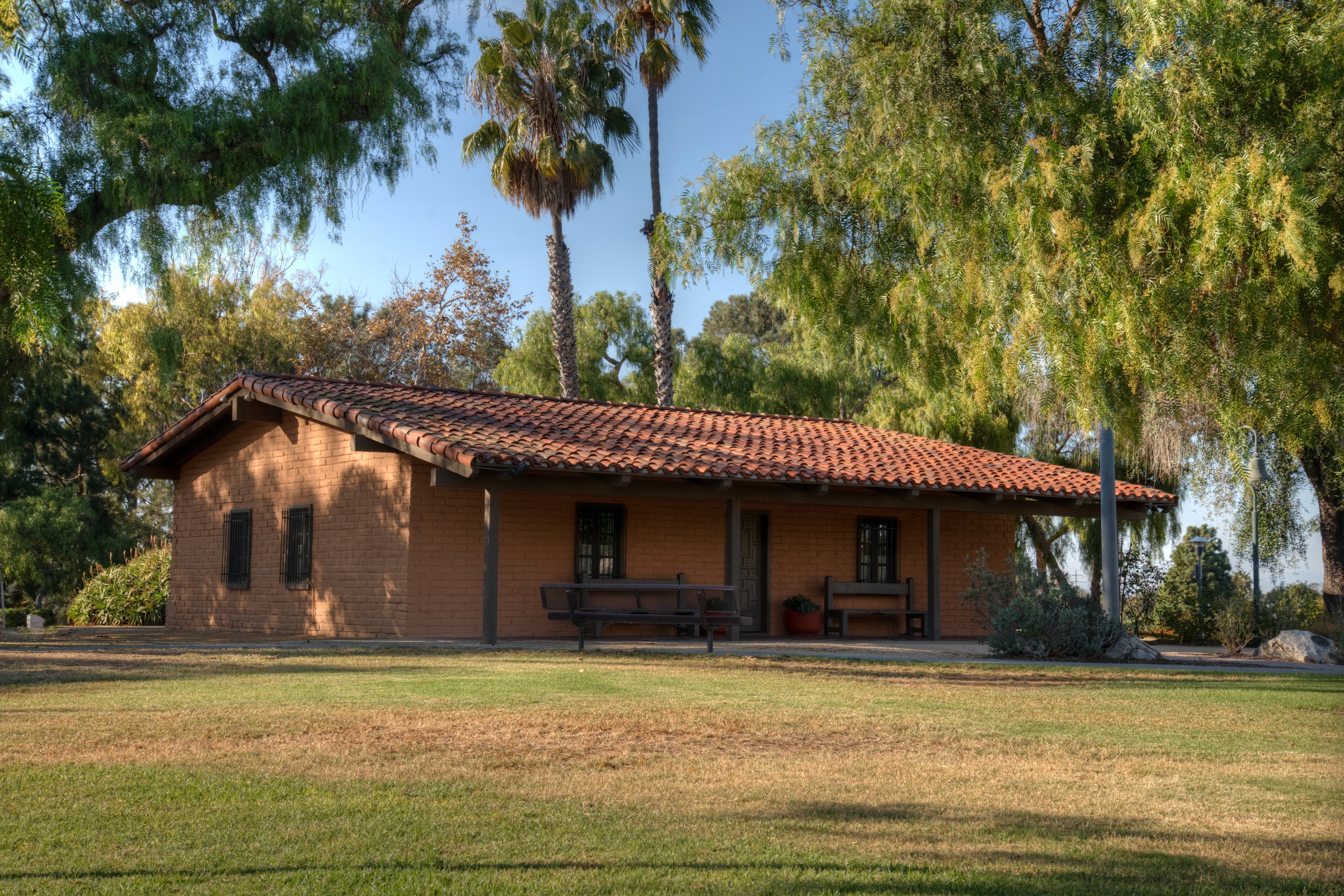
Diego Sepúlveda Adobe in Costa Mesa, a California Historical Landmark.

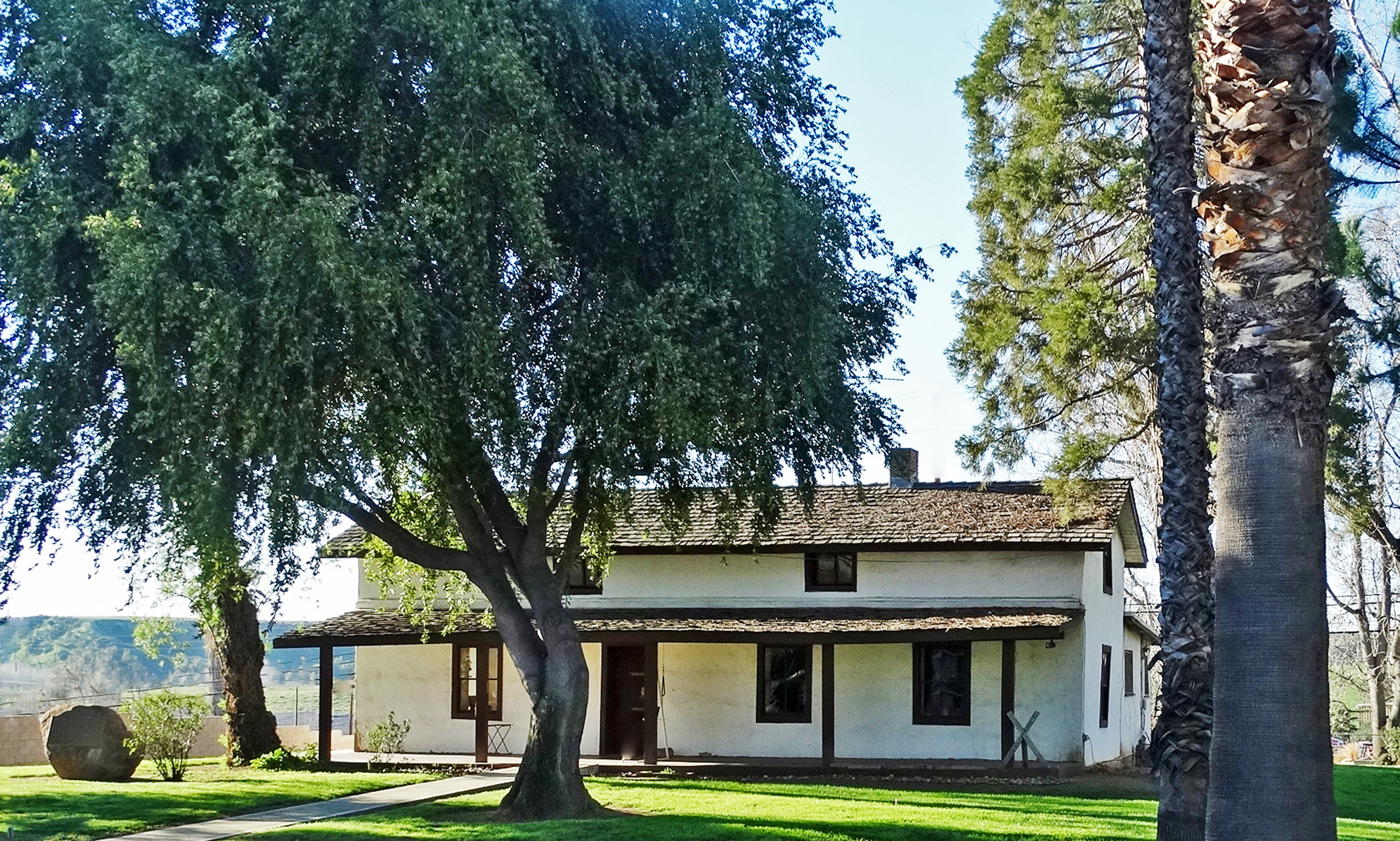
The Yucaipa Adobe was built in 1842 by Diego Sepúlveda

Rudecinda Chapel, in San Pedro, is the burial place of Rudecinda Sepúlveda de Dodson.

The family is the namesake of Sepulveda Boulevard, a vital thoroughfare in Los Angeles and the longest street in Los Angeles County. Sepulveda station in Van Nuys and Expo/Sepulveda station in West Los Angeles both bear the name of the family.

Sepulveda Pass, which passes through the Santa Monica Mountains, connects Los Angeles and the San Fernando Valley, alongside Sepulveda Dam, are both named for the family. Sepulveda, Los Angeles, a neighborhood in the San Fernando Valley, is now commonly known as the North Hills, is named for the family.

Several former estates and homes of the family are now historic landmarks, including:

- Sepulveda House in El Pueblo de Los Ángeles Historical Monument is a National Historic Landmark
- Diego Sepúlveda Adobe in Costa Mesa, California is a California Historical Landmark
- José Dolores Sepúlveda Adobe in Torrance, California is a California Historical Landmark
- Yucaipa Sepúlveda Adobe in Yucaipa, California is a California Historical Landmark
- Site of Home of Diego Sepúlveda in San Pedro, California is a California Historical Landmark
- Sepúlveda Adobe in Malibu Creek State Park
- Site of Home of Diego Sepúlveda in San Pedro, Los Angeles

Numerous schools are named after the family, including:

- Sepulveda Elementary School in Santa Ana
- Sepulveda Elementary School in Torrance
- Francisco Sepulveda Middle School in Los Angeles
- Rudecinda Sepulveda Dodson Middle School in Palos Verdes

== See also ==
- List of Californios people
- Media related to Sepúlveda family of California at Wikimedia Commons
