= Portuguese Bend =

Area on Palos Verdes Peninsula, Los Angeles County, California

Coordinates: 33.74832°N 118.36061°W

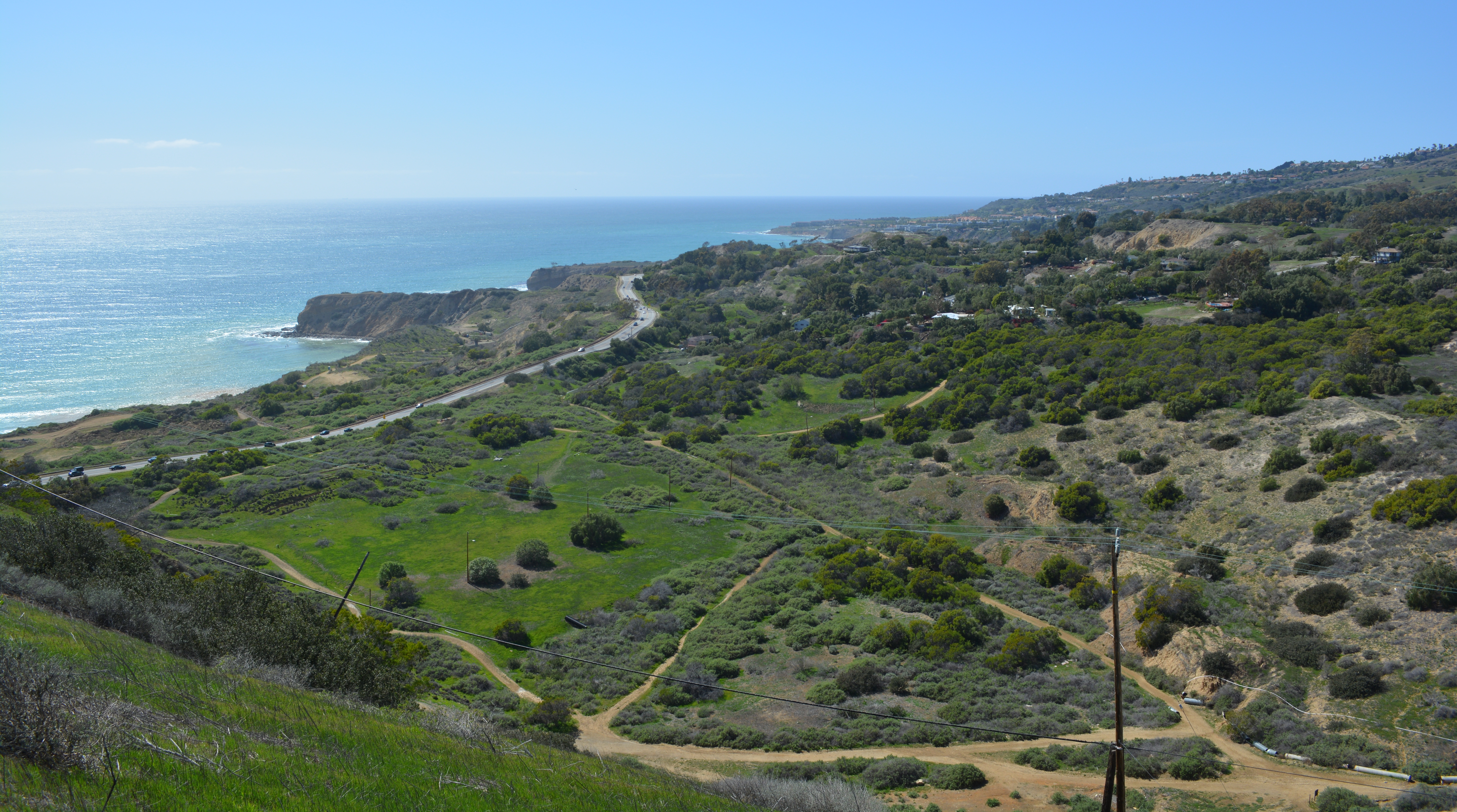
The Portuguese Bend Reserve

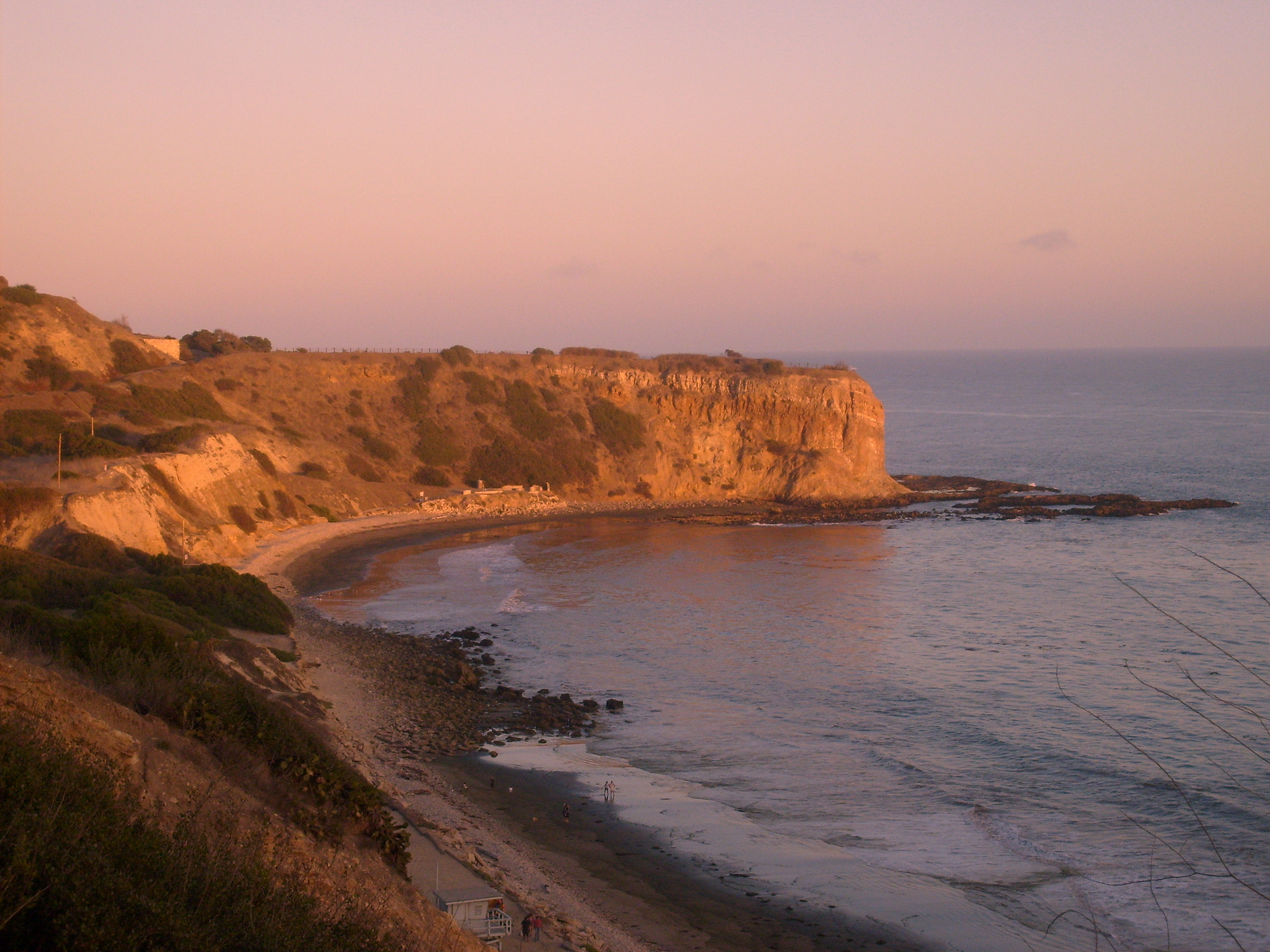
Portuguese Point at sunset

The Portuguese Bend region is the largest area of natural vegetation remaining on the Palos Verdes Peninsula, in Los Angeles County, California. Though once slated for development including the projected route of Crenshaw Boulevard, the area is geologically unstable and is unsuitable for building.

== History of inhabitants ==
=== Native Americans ===
The peninsula was the homeland of the Tongva-Gabrieliño Native Americans. In other areas of the Los Angeles Basin archeological sites date back 8,000 years. Their first contact with Europeans was in 1542 with João Cabrilho (Juan Cabrillo), the explorer who also was the first to write of them. Chowigna and Suangna were two Tongva settlements of many in the peninsula area, which was also a departure point for their rancherias on the Channel Islands.

=== Spanish and Mexican era ===
In 1846 Jose Dolores Sepulveda and José Loreto received a Mexican land grant from Alta California Governor Pío Pico for a parcel from the huge original 1784 Spanish land grant Rancho San Pedro of Manuel Dominguez. It was named Rancho de los Palos Verdes, or "ranch of the green sticks", which was used primarily as a cattle ranch.

=== American era ===
By 1882 ownership of the land had passed from the Sepulveda through various mortgage holders to Jotham Bixby of Rancho Los Cerritos, who leased the land to Japanese farmers. Early in the 20th century most of Bixby's land was sold to a consortium of New York investors who created The Palos Verdes Project and began marketing land on the peninsula for small horse ranches and residential communities.

=== The whaling era ===
The name Portuguese Bend comes from the whaling activities of Portuguese whalemen from the Azores. An Azorean shore whaling captain named José Machado brought shore whaling to this bend in the coastline north of San Pedro Bay after the closure of the San Pedro Bay whaling station on Deadman's Island in or about 1862. He brought with him a crew of Azorean whalemen. In 1864, Captain Clark moved his operations to San Simeon Bay. In 1869, the station was operated by the John Brown Whaling Company (Los Angeles Star, March 13, 1869). In 1874, Captain Frank Anderson (né Anasio) brought a crew from Port Harford in San Luis Obispo County. His operation at Portuguese Bend lasted from 1874 to 1877. During three winters (December–April) he obtained 2,166 barrels of oil from trying out the blubber flensed from gray whales he had caught on their annual migration along the California coast. He abandoned the station thereafter, establishing another further north at Pigeon Point. An 1888 U.S. Fish Commission Report stated that whales had been caught from Portuguese Bend as late as 1884, suggesting another party utilized the area for whaling up until that date. The Old Whaling Station there was designated a California Historic Landmark (No. 381) on Jan. 3, 1944.

=== The Vanderlip era ===
Frank A. Vanderlip, Sr. (1864–1937) was known as the "Father of Palos Verdes". He purchased the 16,000 acre Rancho de los Palos Verdes from Jotham Bixby in 1913. In 1916, he built the Vanderlip estates near the Portuguese Bend area of Palos Verdes, California. His daughter-in-law Elin Vanderlip maintained residence at the estate until her death in 2009 and her husband's ashes are spread on the grounds. The Vanderlips championed many of the landmarks in Rancho Palos Verdes, notably Wayfarers Chapel (The church was designed by Lloyd Wright (son of Frank Lloyd Wright) in the late 1940s and was built between 1949 and 1951.), Marineland of the Pacific, Portuguese Bend Riding Club (featured in the movie Chinatown), Marymount College, Palos Verdes and Chadwick School.

In 1949 Kelvin Cox Vanderlip, Sr. built the Portuguese Bend Beach Club (a gated beach house community The houses were built on lots leased for 25 years and were the typical 1940s weekend places where people went to have a quiet time at the beach. Back then there was a clubhouse, restaurant, paddle tennis courts, 50-foot swimming pool, a sandy beach, and a 485-foot long pier where boats could tie up.

== Geology and landslides ==
During the late Pleistocene, the Palos Verdes hills were an offshore island. The island later became a peninsula, when the region between the island and the mainland filled with alluvial deposits from the mountain ranges near the Los Angeles Basin. The Palos Verdes Hills are part of an uplifted block, with a northwest trend, bounded on the northeast by the Palos Verdes fault zone. Most of the movement along this fault is dip-slip, resulting in an uplift of about 1 km of the Palos Verdes Hills relative to the Los Angeles basin.

The Palos Verdes Peninsula consists of several cores and sedimentary rock.

=== Surficial deposits ===
Surficial deposits of the Palos Verdes Hills consists of stratigraphic layers, in order from oldest to youngest:

- Late Pleistocene stream terrace gravel
- Late Pleistocene marine terrace deposits
- Late Quaternary dune sand
- Late Quaternary soil
- Late Quaternary talus
- Late Quaternary non-marine terrace cover
- Late Quaternary slope wash and creep deposits
- Holocene beach deposits
- Holocene alluvium.

The ground surface in the central and southern parts of the district is low and hummocky, reflecting the location of numerous late Quaternary landslides. These hills form an elongated topographic dome that rises from sea level to altitudes of more than 430 meters.

=== Landslides ===
==== Description and characterization ====
The Portuguese Bend landslide occupies an area of roughly two square miles and denotes reoccurring movement on the eastern side of a series of prehistoric landslides. The city of Rancho Palos Verdes sits on four out of five sub-slides of the Ancient Altamira Landslide Complex, including Portuguese Bend Landslide Complex, the Abalone Cove Landslide Complex and the Klondike Canyon Landslide Complex, and Beach Club Landslides. The complex covers approximately 240 acres.

==== History ====
The Palos Verdes Peninsula landslides and ground failures may have roots as long as 250,000 years ago. Certain landslides span 260 acres (1.1 km^{2}) with an average thickness of 135 feet (41 m). Ground failure occurs on an overall smooth surface approximately 100 feet (30 m) below the surface, and over the years has been due to seaward-dipping strata, rock weakness and continual coastal erosion. Prehistoric landslides are believed to be so extensive that they destroyed the formation of higher wave-cut benches.

==== 1956 Portuguese Bend Landslide ====
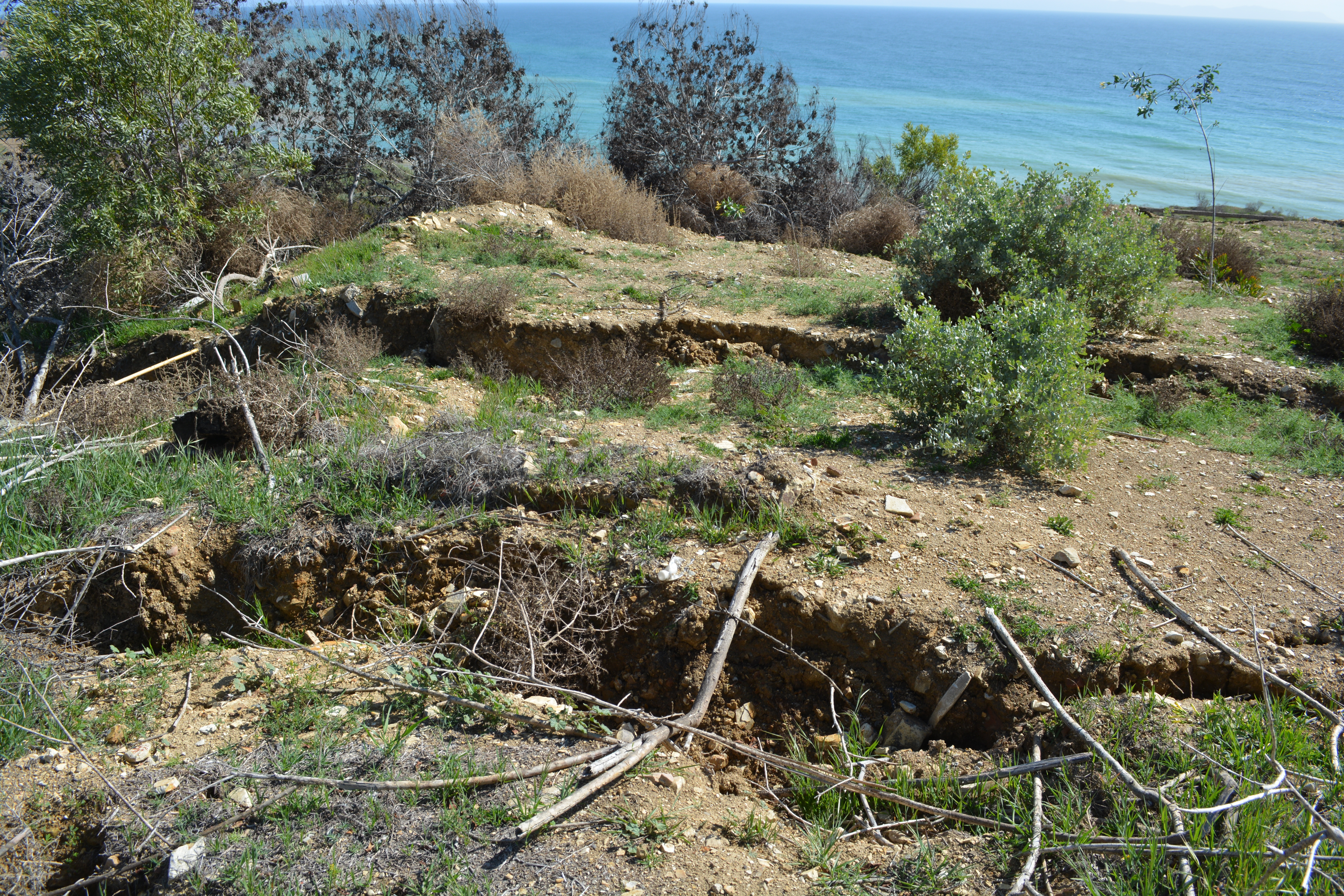
Large surface rifts caused by the Portuguese Bend landslide

The Portuguese Bend area has a history of landslides. Beginning in September 1956 and continuing until early 1957, the area experienced a landslide concurrent with the construction of a road (the Crenshaw Boulevard extension, south of Crest Road) along the top of an ancient landslide complex. During this construction, excavated sediment was dumped onto the upper slopes of the complex along with hundreds of thousands of gallons of water which lubricated a layer of bentonite clay formed by the subsurface weathering of volcanic rock called tuff. This layer of bentonite slants down to the Pacific Ocean enabling down-slope movement. A 1958 video newsreel showed the effects of the movement: 140 of the 170 homes in the area were destroyed or displaced. A successful lawsuit was filed by area homeowners in 1961; the plaintiffs won $10 million in compensation against Los Angeles County, the party responsible for the road construction.

Another possible contributing cause of the 1956 sliding was the construction of hundreds of homes on and above the unstable rock and soil in the early 1950s prior to the slide. Home development on the Peninsula has been a factor in coastline ground movement for several decades. Residential sewage treatment facilities (cesspool or septic system), lawns, gardens, and others may contribute to ground shifts in the area. It is expected that the homes that remained after the 1956 landslide and the ones built since then would have above ground water and sewage lines available to reduce property damage.

==== Abalone Cove Slide ====
From 1974 to 1978, an 80 acre landslide occurred in the Abalone Cove area. The lower part of the landslide started to move in February 1974. The "Abalone Cove Slide" was moving so slowly that geologists did not verify that it was an actual slide until 1976, after it had damaged roughly twenty homes.

The upper part of the slide may have started to shift in the spring of 1978. That year, the city restricted building new homes in areas impacted by the landslides, "Landslide Moratorium Map." Since 1980, efforts to control landslide movement have involved removing ground water from the landslide mass.

==== Klondike Canyon Landslide Complex ====
The Klondike Canyon has been noted for landslides. Renewed movement occurred in 1979, and a Geologic Hazard Abatement Districts was created to study the Klondike Canyon landslides in 1982.

==== Beach Club Landslide ====
The Portuguese Beach Club landslide is a minor slide within the area's landslide complex. In 2024, residents of Seaview and the Beach Club filed a lawsuit against the City of Rancho Palos Verdes.

==== Portuguese Bend and Seaview Landslide ====
Since Spring 2023, there has been noticeable land movement and collateral damage in the Portuguese Bend Beach Club, Portuguese Bend Community Association, and Seaview neighborhoods. Several miles of trails have closed in the Abalone Cove Reserve, Filiorum Reserve, Forrestal Reserve, and Portuguese Bend Reserve areas.

In September 2024, more than 200 homeowners had to evacuate the Portuguese Bend and Seaview areas. The city of Rancho Palos Verdes issued an evacuation warning for residents in response to landslides that are moving at a rate of three-fourths to one foot per week. Gas to the Portuguese Bend neighborhood has been shutoff since August 2024. For safety reason, local utility companies planned to terminate all electricity for impacted residents.

On September 3, 2024, California Governor Gavin Newsom declared a state of emergency in the City of Rancho Palos Verdes. The city has extended a construction moratorium for the landslide areas until October 2025.

== Habitat ==
The geographical location and geological history of the peninsula make the remaining habitat extremely valuable for ecological and other scientific reasons. The peninsula, which was an island with the Palos Verdes Hills in recent geological time, has close floral and faunal similarities to the California Channel Islands. This feature makes the Portuguese Bend Landslide area a natural research laboratory for the study of island biogeography and evolutionary ecology.

The vegetation found in the area is coastal sage scrub. This plant community supports a surprising number and variety of species. There are at least three races of birds resident on the peninsula that are found nowhere else except the Channel Islands. These are the insular forms of the orange-crowned warbler, Pacific-slope flycatcher, and Allen's hummingbird. The same phenomenon has been documented for plant species. A species of live-forever, Dudleya virens, which is native to the Channel Islands and the Palos Verdes Peninsula, is found near Point Vicente Lighthouse.

The area also serves as habitat to many migrating birds moving through the region in fall and spring. The Peninsula is a headland that juts into the Pacific Ocean several miles further than the surrounding coastline. Migrating terrestrial and shore birds, flying over the open ocean on their north–south migration along the Pacific Flyway, spot this headland and stop to rest and feed. Many of these birds will stay and spend the winter in the area. Thus, the geographic position makes this habitat much more important than might otherwise be expected.

In general, the area has been lightly disturbed, and much natural vegetation remains. Intense disturbances, in the form of heavy off-road vehicle and pedestrian use, have been limited. Grazing also took place at one time.
