= Ygnacio Sepúlveda =

American judge and attorney (1842–1916)

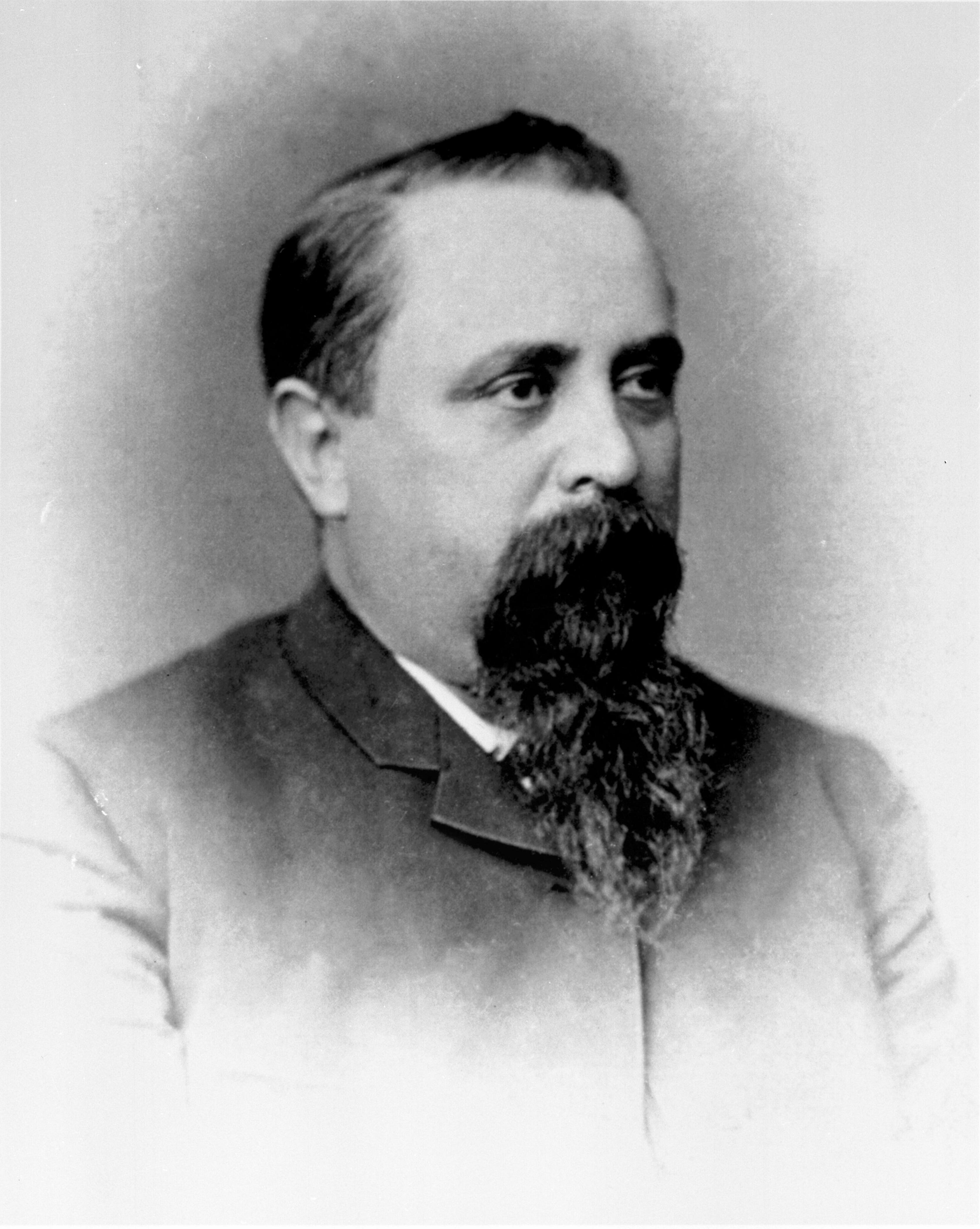

Member of the California State Assembly from the 2nd district
- In office December 7, 1863 – December 4, 1865
- Preceded by: Multi-member district
- Succeeded by: Multi-member district

Personal details
- Born: July 1, 1842 Pueblo de Los Ángeles, Alta California, Mexico
- Died: December 2, 1916 (aged 74) Los Angeles, California, U.S.
- Resting place: Santa Barbara Mission Cemetery, Santa Barbara, California, U.S.
- Party: Democratic
- Spouse: Herlinda de la Guerra (m. 1883)
- Children: Conchita; Ora
- Relatives: Sepúlveda family
- Occupation: Attorney, politician

Ygnacio Sepulveda-Ávila (July 1, 1842 – December 2, 1916) was a Californio attorney and politician who served as one of the first judges of the Superior Court of Los Angeles County.

== Family and education ==
Ygnacio Sepúlveda, a member of the prominent Sepúlveda family of California, was born on July 1, 1842, in the Pueblo de Los Ángeles, Alta California, Mexico. He was the son of Jose Andres Sepúlveda, grantee of Rancho San Joaquin in present day Orange County, and Francisca Avila. His grandfather was Francisco Sepúlveda II, the grantee of Rancho San Vicente in present day Los Angeles County. His early boyhood was spent in Los Angeles, but when older he was sent to prep schools in Boston, Massachusetts.

He was married on December 13, 1883, to Herlinda de la Guerra of Santa Barbara, California. He and his wife, who died in 1920, had two daughters, Conchita Sepúlveda Chapman Pignatelli and Ora Sepúlveda. He had two sisters, Mrs. Thomas D. Mott and Tranquilina Sepúlveda.

== Legal career ==
=== California ===
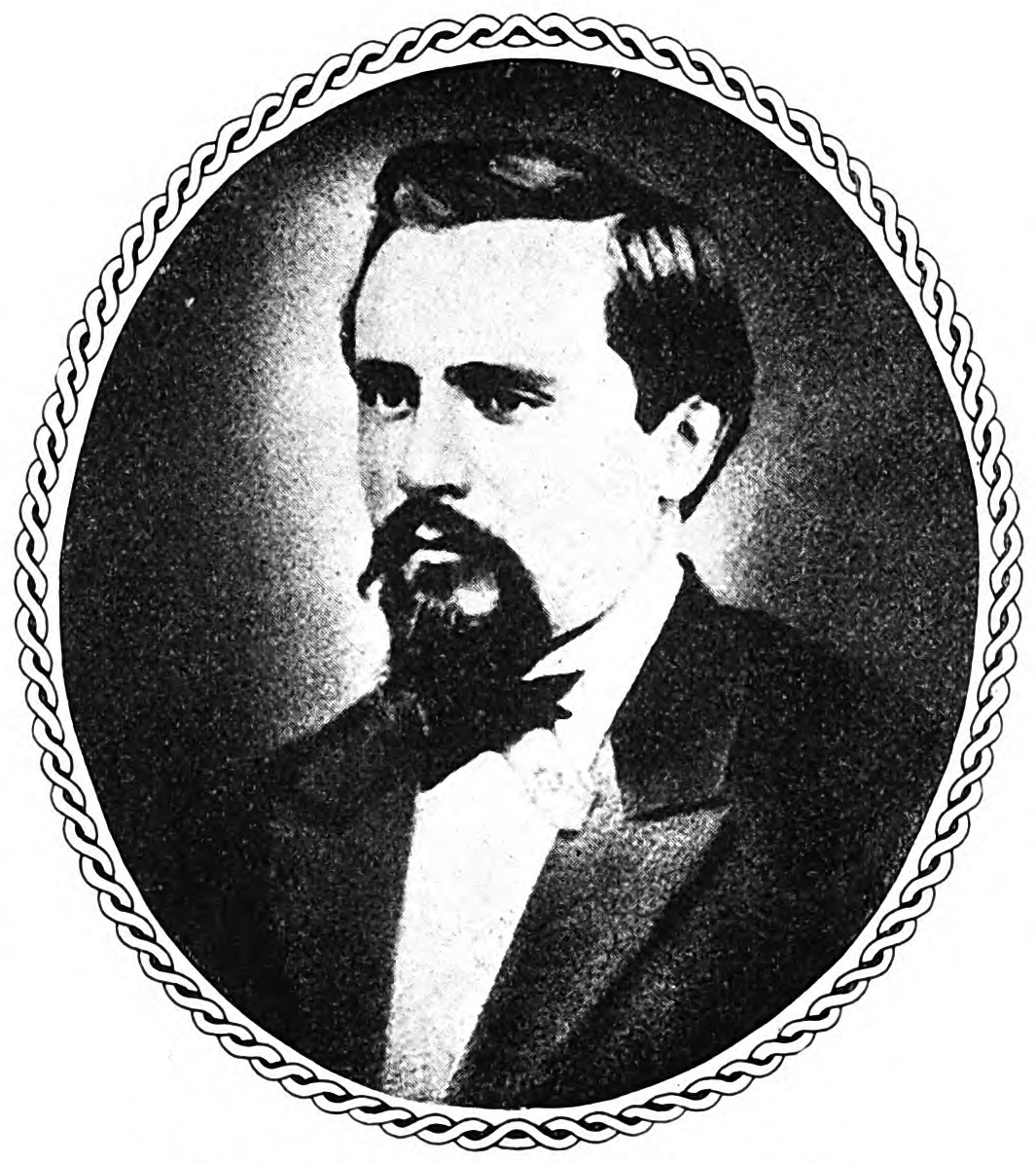
Sepúlveda c. 1874

Sepúlveda was admitted to the California State Bar in 1860 or 1863 and was elected to the California State Assembly in 1863, serving as a Democrat for one term from 1863 to 1865. He was elected a county judge in 1863 or 1869 and a district judge in 1874 or 1875. He became one of the first two Superior Court judges for Los Angeles County in 1879, the other being Volney E. Howard. In 1872, he was a member of the first governing board for the Los Angeles Public Library system.

=== Mexico ===
In December 1883 Sepúlveda left Los Angeles and moved to Mexico City, where he spent thirty years practicing law and became the administrator of jurisprudence and legislation under the administration of President Porfirio Diaz of Mexico. In 1895 he was made the first secretary and chargé d'affaires of the United States in Mexico. While in that country, in 1905 he helped organize the Guadalupe Council of the Knights of Columbus.

In 1895 Sepúlveda was elected a member of the Mexican Academy of Jurisprudence and Legislation.

=== Return ===
He returned to Los Angeles in 1914, with his wife and one daughter, to find a city greatly changed. He told a reporter that:

I am constantly comparing myself to Rip Van Winkle, and there is a certain sadness in this coming back after thirty years. With the exception of a flying visit six years ago, I have not seen my old home in all that time. ... The disturbed conditions in Mexico were large factors in my decision to give up our home in that country.

== Death ==
Sepúlveda died at the age of 74 on December 2, 1916, in his home at 2639 Monmouth Avenue in today's University Park district. A requiem mass was celebrated on December 5 at Saint Agnes Church, Vermont Avenue and West Adams Street, and interment followed at Santa Barbara Mission Cemetery in Santa Barbara, CA.

== Legacy ==
In 2006, Sepúlveda's was one of the first names placed on a Wall of Fame sponsored by the Los Angeles County Bar Association.
