= Rancho de los Palos Verdes =

Mexican land grant in California

Coordinates: 33.780°N 118.3380°W

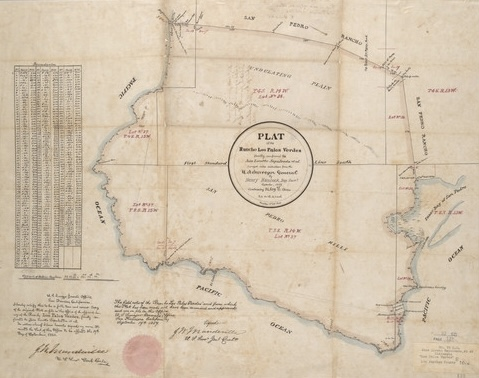
A 1859 Map of Rancho De Los Palos Verdes

Rancho de los Palos Verdes (Spanish pronunciation: [/ˈranʧo ðe los ˈpaloz ˈβeɾðes/] RAN-cho de los PA-los BER-des) was a 31,629-acre (128.00 km^{2}) Mexican land grant in present-day Los Angeles County, California, given in 1846 by Governor Pío Pico to José Loreto and Juan Capistrano Sepulveda. The name means "Ranch of the Green Trees". The grant encompassed the present-day cities of the Palos Verdes Peninsula, as well as portions of San Pedro, Torrance, Redondo Beach, Compton, Gardena, Lomita, Harbor City, Carson, Dominguez Hills, Wilmington, Los Angeles

== History ==
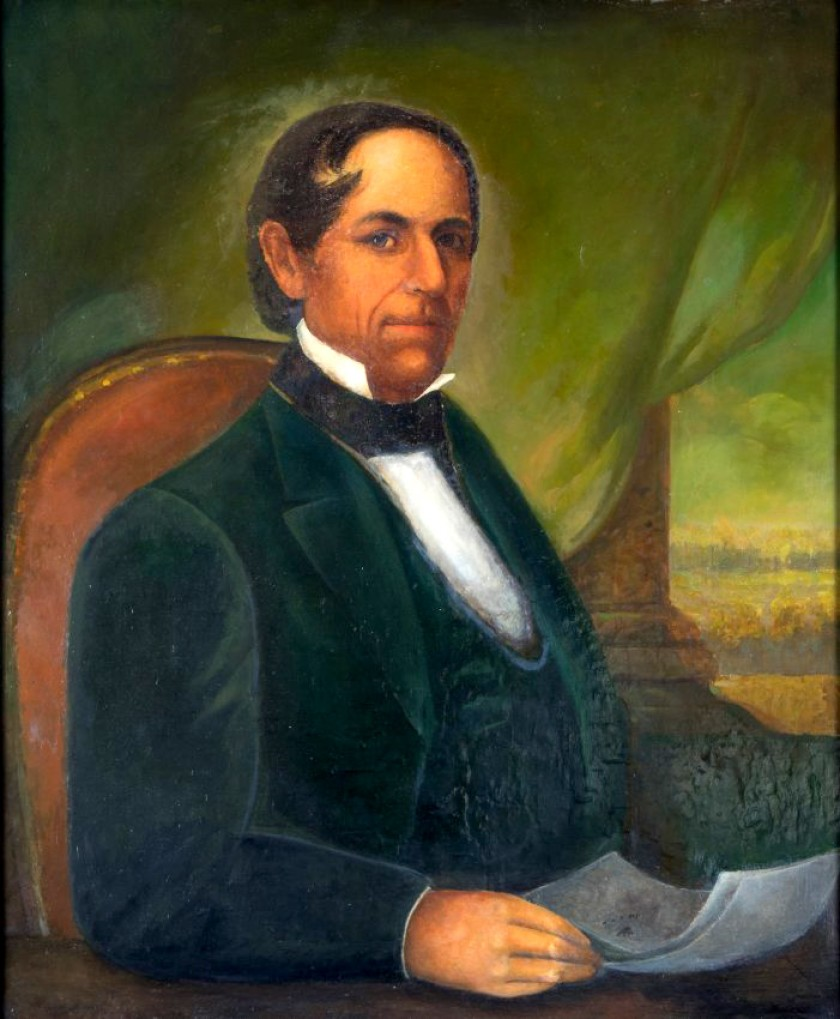
Manuel Domínguez, a signer of the Californian Constitution and owner of Rancho San Pedro, which included all of Palos Verdes.

The grant was originally a part of Manuel Dominguez's Rancho San Pedro Spanish land grant. Around 1810 Manuel Guttierez, executor of Dominguez's will and de facto owner of his rancho, granted permission to then 17-year-old Jose Dolores Sepulveda to herd livestock in the southwestern reaches of the Rancho San Pedro. This eventually became the basis for the Sepulveda family's contested claim to the Rancho de los Palos Verdes. Dolores had trouble getting his land title cleared, so he took a trip to Monterey to get the matter definitely settled and, on his return trip, he was killed in the Chumash revolt at Mission La Purísima Concepción in 1824. In 1834, a judicial decree was made by Governor Jose Figueroa which was intended to settle the dispute between the Dominquez and Sepulveda families.

With the cession of California to the United States following the Mexican–American War, the 1848 Treaty of Guadalupe Hidalgo provided that the land grants would be honored. As required by the Land Act of 1851, a claim for Rancho de los Palos Verdes was filed with the Public Land Commission in 1852, and the grant was patented to José Loreto and Juan Capistrano Sepulveda in 1880.

By 1882 ownership of the land had passed from the Sepulveda through various mortgage holders to Jotham Bixby of Rancho Los Cerritos, who leased the land to Japanese farmers. After the turn of the century most of Bixby's land was sold to a consortium of New York investors spearheaded by Frank A. Vanderlip that created The Palos Verdes Project and began marketing land on the peninsula for small horse ranches and residential communities.

== Spanish era ==
The first Spanish sailor and soldier to come into contact with the Indigenous population on the Palos verdes Peninsula was Juan Cabrillo. While Juan Cabrillo's journey took him the entire California and Oregon coast he is noted with having stopped near Catalina island and is known to have skirted along the coast of the Peninsula. Vizcaino was to be the Second Spanish soldier and Sailor to land near the peninsula. “The smoke from many fires and green vegetation on the hills of the Palos Verdes Peninsula attracted them, but as they approached the bay to its southeast end, Vizcaino evaluated the harbor as having insufficient protection from the wind.”

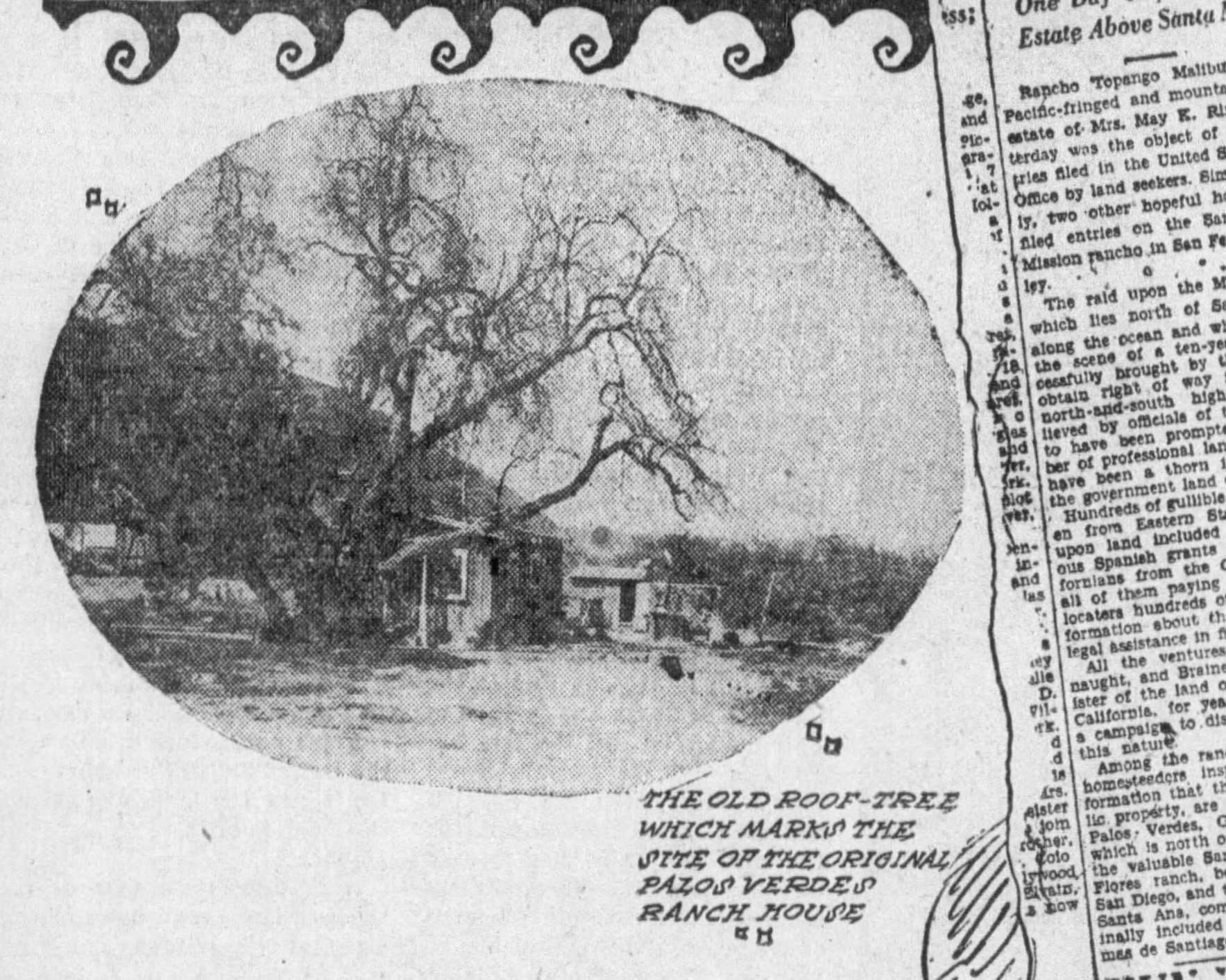
The old roof tree which marks the site of the original Palos Verdes ranch house (1926)

He would later land near Catalina and continue up the coast.During the Spanish era land was granted to people by the Spanish king and the land of Palos Verdes was not exception the land had been granted to a brave man of the Spanish army by the name of Dolores Sepulveda. He was granted 32,000 acres of land which now make up four different subdivisions. “The land which the city of Rolling Hills, the City of Palos Verdes Estates and the cities of San Pedro, Wilmington and other communities are now located came into private ownership”

In 1781 the Spanish set out to build a community on the land that would later become known as Palos Verdes along with the families that joined a group of soldiers were supposed to join. One such soldier was Francisco Xavier Sepúlveda the soldiers came with their wives and children as well. Francisco brought his wife Maria Candelaria de Redondo. “His grandson would later become the founder and owner of Rancho de los Palos Verdes.”

== Sepúlveda family and Ranch ==
The Sepúlveda Family was granted a larger tract of land of which was the Rancho de los Palos Verdes. José Dolores was the first Sepúlveda to officially own the land as he had worked the land under his presumed relative Manual Gutiérrez. Manuel Gutiérrez had owned the Rancho San Pedro which would be broken up and a section given to Jose Dolores Sepúlveda. Jose Dolores was

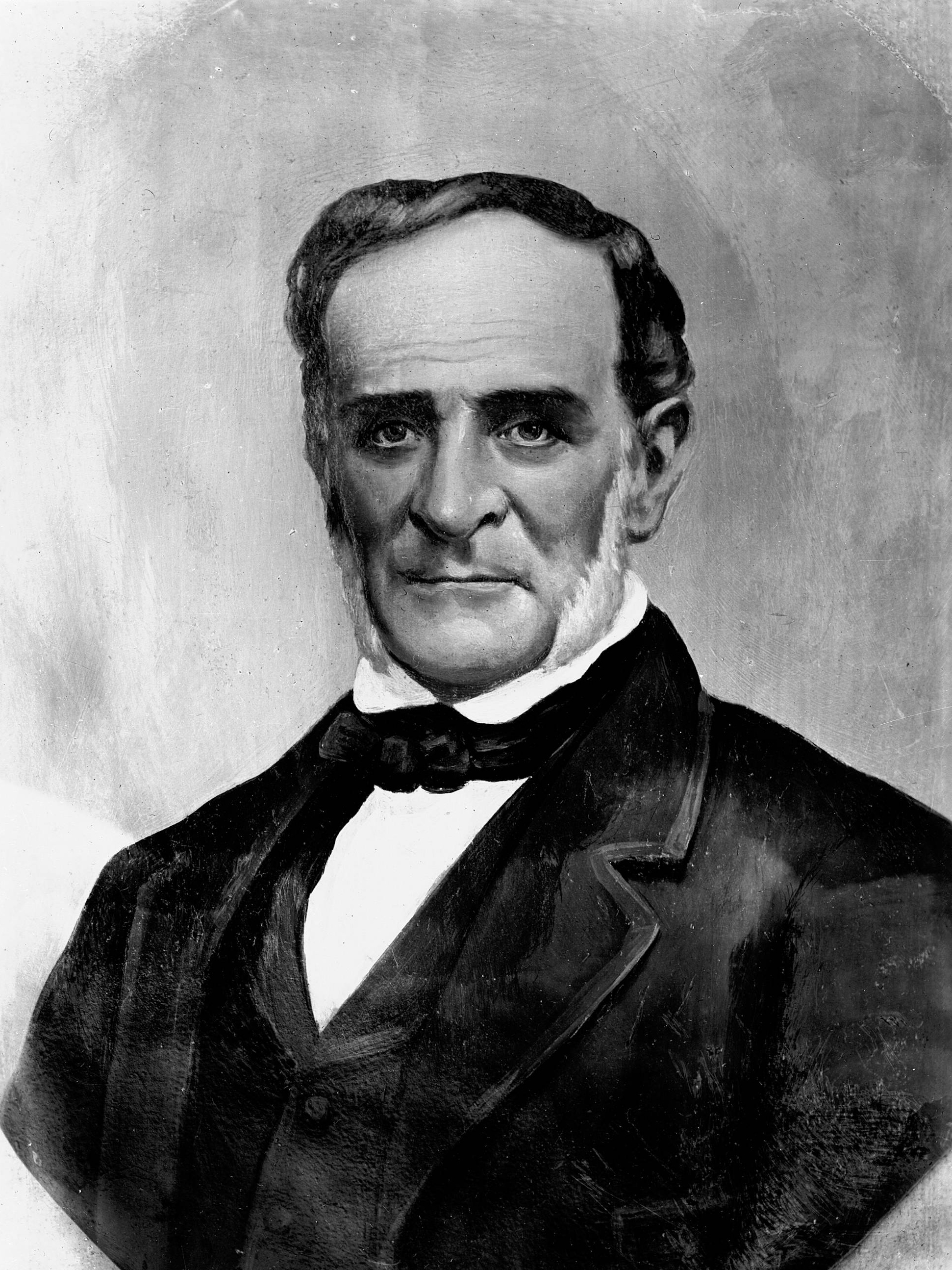
In 1846, Rancho de los Palos Verdes was separated from Rancho San Pedro and granted to José Loreto Sepúlveda (shown) and Juan Capistrano Sepúlveda

born to Juan Jose Sepúlveda and his wife Tomasa Gutiérrez in 1793 by the time he was 16 both of his parents had died. This is when he started to work the land he eventually settled on the land that was to be his in the future. The family needed to fight for their right to own the land as the man who had awarded them the right to farm the land had a tenuous claim at that point which was to be fought over later for many years by Cristobal Dominguez the nephew of the original owner.

When Cristobal Dominguez sent a decree for the removal of Jose Dolores it was immediately denied and he immediately set out a counterclaim to the Pueblo officials. “He took immediate action to the fight for his land. He filed a format counterclaim with the Pueblo officials, insisting that he was entitled to remain… The he took off for Monterey to make a personal appeal to the New Mexican Governor.” When Cristobal came back for the land that he believed to be rightfully his he brought a petition against the Sepulveda's as he believed they were squatting on the land. The Sepúlveda's believed they owned the land because they were given legal custody of it as well as tilled the land for many years. When this went up against a judge the judge gave all the land to the Sepúlveda's as a donation. The outcome of this court case was in favor of the Sepulveda brothers while Guttierez got the decree that he would be able to farm on the land for the rest of his life but his family could not inherit the land he was visibly angry after this decision. The brothers built their adobes on the land which would later become the Gaffey area they built modest homes for themselves and their wives and expanded as they produced more cattle and funds. The first 12 years that they lived on the land they were involved in litigation suits with the Dominguez family over the land. They were described as being dashing young men who would ride into town and play a game on monte with the town. “Dressed for the occasion in broad-brimmed hats, jackets of bright colored cloth, flaring pantaloons slit below the knees, with red sashes wound around their waist, and brilliant serapes draped over their shoulders, they were a dashing pair”

The brothers thought that their troubles were through when it came to land disputes when Governor Figueroa laid out the Arbitration decree of 1834. In 1839 the Domínguez family “Dominguez submitted another petition for our land and we have been ordered to leave.”

== The Treaty of Guadalupe Hidalgo ==
On February 2, 1848, Treaty of Guadalupe Hidalgo was signed between the United States and Mexico which officially ended the Mexican–American War that began in 1846. The treaty officially stated that certain territories that belonged to Mexico would now become part of the United States. A total of seven states were acquired by the U.S. government one of which was the state of California, where the Rancho de los Palos Verdes is located.

Article 8 of the treaty, mentions that the property rights of the Mexican citizens who owned property that was occupied by the United States, would be respected under the government of the United States. The same section also granted full American citizenship for those who lived in these states before becoming part of the United States if desired. That included the people who lived in the Ranchos of California that were established in were established during the Spanish and Mexican periods. In 1939, Palos Verdes Estates, California became the first of four cities to be incorporated in the Los Angeles County, California region. The cities that followed were Rolling Hills, California, Rolling Hills Estates, California (Both in 1957), and Rancho Palos Verdes, California in 1973.

== Frank A. Vanderlip ==
Frank A. Vanderlip (November 17, 1864 - June 30, 1937) was a successful banker in New York was the president of The National City Bank he was also one of the youngest president showing his immense talent. He was first and foremost a journalist that was

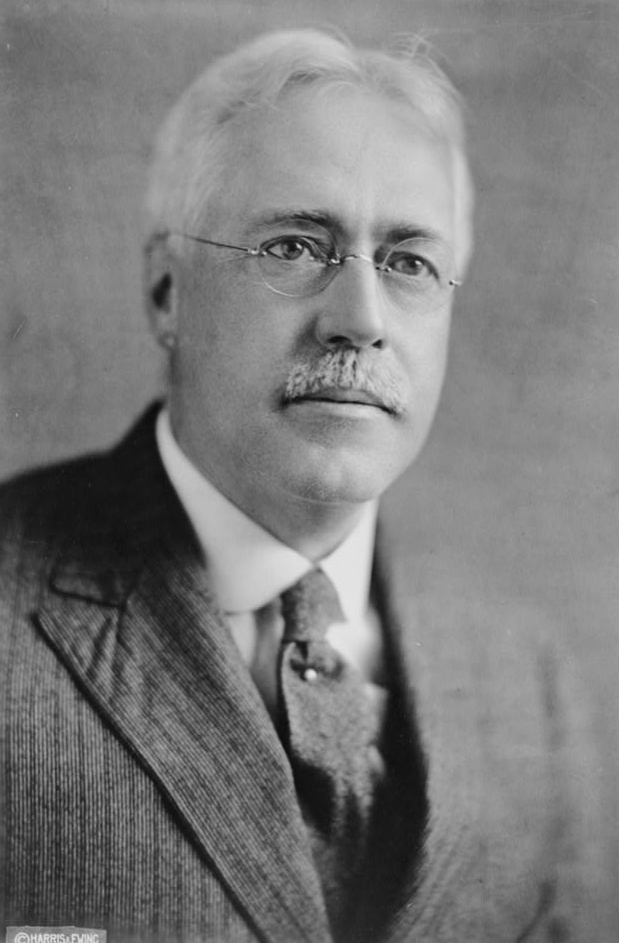
Frank A. Vanderlip an American Banker

how he got his start in the world. He along with his friends bought the Palos Verdes Land without seeing it, and it is stated that the price may have been in the millions. He married Narcissa Cox in 1903. Frank had was the who in 1913 purchased the Land he had purchased the land sight unseen. Frank would make a home for him and his family on the property and name it after his wife Narcissa. The home would become known as Villa Narcissa and this would be the place that Frank and his family would spend the summer as well as recuperate when they were sick especially when frank caught typhoid which prompted the move out. This is to be debated as his son would later go on to say that he has sent some before hand to see the land. He bought the land at a good price as it was less than $100 for an acre. He is described as saying “ it seemed like an empire a beautiful empire with miles of sea coast gleaming crescent beaches picturesque rolling hills and occasionally more picturesque canyons” His original dream for what the land would become was “He saw an artisans village built against the cliffs at point Vicente with docks for waterborne commerce” In 1913 months after he purchased the land he became ill and his doctor suggested he move to the countryside for a while. He took this opportunity to finally visit the land that he purchased. When he arrived he built the Villa Narcissa in honor of his wife it was completed in 1924 and still stands to this day. The Villa is still owned and operated by the Vanderlip family. When he bought the land he had no intention of developing it himself and promoting it so he hired a number of different people to help in this task one being that of E.G Lewis. E.G Lewis had a vision of what he wanted Palos verdes to look like and this is what he said about it “The Reviera of the Pacific coast a great acropolis the most beautiful residential city in the world overshadowing the greatest metropolis.”

The Vanderlip sold a portion of their land to the Great Lakes Carbon Corporation in 1953. They had purchased the land for the purpose of mining the eventually failed to mine anything of substance so they hired architects to further build the land “Palos verdes estates had incorporated in 1939 and just prior to the great building boom in the late 1950s and early 1960s the cities of Rolling Hills and Rolling Hills estates both incorporated in 1957.”

In Rancho Palos verdes there is a park in dedication to Frank A Vanderlip and his vision for the peninsula all those years ago. The park sits on “0.48 acres of land and has unobstructed views of the ocean.”

The house that Frank Vanderlip built for him and his family still stands in its original condition. The property sits atop 11.5 acres is named after Frank Vanderlip's long time wife. The actual home was built in 1926 and consists of 7,700 square feet. “The Tuscan-style architecture and furnishings were inspired by his several trips to Europe, including a cruise through the Mediterranean with his wife.”

== The Palos Verdes Project ==
The Palos Verdes Project was started in 1922 by a group of men who wanted to revitalize Frank Vanderlips dream which had been put on hold due to illness and World War One. While Vanderlip continued his support of the creation of Palos Verdes he pulled his interest in 1922 and sold his acreage to E.G Lewis. Vanderlip recruited famed landscape artists the Olmsted Brothers for development and E.G Lewis to promote the land. The next man that Vanderlip would hire for the Palos verdes project was Charles Cheney to act as City Planner. He is quoted with having envisioned the land as "The ideal residential suburb…where on could build his home…without fear that the neighborhood would ever be unsightly or undesirable."

Vanderlip only sought to hire respectable men who came with positive recommendations. E.G. Lewis initially fit this description but soon became involved in mail fraud and other disqualifying practices, resulting in his eventual release as promoter of the project. The Malaga Cove area was to be developed first to entice people to buy the land they had “ On Sunday afternoons to watch stunt flying and Spanish dancing while they enjoyed their free lunch and coffee”

The first building to be built was La Venta inn, a place where Vanderlip imagined he could entertain his friends and businessmen could hold meetings to indulge their guests. It was originally called “Clubhouse 764” but was changed to La Venta inn which translates to “The Sale”, a perfect embodiment of the mission of the building.

The next building to be built was the start of Malaga Cove, called the Gardiner Building. It hosted a multitude of businesses including a drug store and grocery store. The Malaga Cove School was the next major building to help grow the peninsula through the creation of the Peninsula school district, although the school is no longer in operation.

E.J Lewis the original promoter of the peninsula had created estimates to how much the project would cost “ He estimated the cost of the city, excepting the construction of private homes at 30,000,000$ the estimate included parklands, schools, public building, club, golf links, flying fields, a yacht harbor, 125 miles of paved boulevards and trust funds of 5,000,000 for building loans and 4,000,000 for transportation.”

The board of trustees were divided on this they would end up pulling their support which meant the project would fall apart. E.J Lewis managed to retain a million dollars while most was sent back to the people who paid. This money ended up going to the purchasing of 3200 acres which would make up the city of Palos Verdes Estates.

Olmsted Brothers

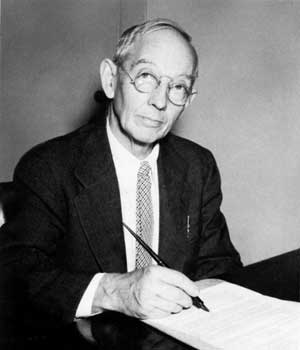
Frederick Law Olmsted Jr. the landscape designer for Palos Verdes.

The Olmsted brothers were among the most prestigious landscape artists of their time. They were hired by Vanderlip to design the plot of land. Vanderlip gravitated towards them to design the landscape because of their high respectability and stellar recommendation's. They agreed with frank on the vision of the peninsula as the ultimate suburb. Frederick Olmsted Sr. is credited with planning and designing Central Park in New York it is his sons who are credited with designing the new suburbs. His son is quoted with having said when looking at the amazing views that the land possessed “ How often are men given such an almost untouched great area…May we who are now responsible place parks and open spaces, roads, not for racing but to look at the beauty, and may the generations whoo follow keep this in their minds and plans”

== Historic sites of the Rancho ==
- Site of Adobe Home of Jose Dolores Sepulveda. Dolores Sepulveda's adobe was built in 1818. The Jose Dolores Sepulveda Adobe was designated a California Historic Landmark (No. 383) on Jan. 03, 1944.
- La Venta Inn - The site of Frank Vanderlip's original Real estate office and the first building to be built in Palos Verdes estates. It was the first permanent building constructed by the Palos Verdes Project and was originally called "Clubhouse 764".
- Vanderlip Estate - The land of the estate was purchased by Frank A Vanderlip Sr. from the Bixby family in 1913. Vanderlip envisioned constructing a residential community with the design that was inspired by Central Park in New York City. The houses were designed in a Spanish style. The construction of the estate officially began in the 1920s as the plans for the construction were delayed due to the start of World War I.
- Wayfarers Chapel - The chapel was located in the Portuguese Bend area in Rancho Palos Verdes, California. It was designed by Frank Lloyd Wright Jr. and built in 1951. The chapel was designed mainly of glass, giving a scenic view on the inside as the sun would shine brightly, making it a popular place to host weddings (as it was mainly used for). In May 2024, the chapel was permanently closed due to the movement of land as it is located near the coast.
- Neptune Fountain - On February 16, 1930, the Neptune Fountain was unveiled in the Malaga Cove Plaza by Jay Lawyer who was the manager of the Palos Verdes Project as a gift for the people of the city. The fountain is a replica of another one that is located in Bologna Italy.

== See also ==
- Ranchos of California
- List of Ranchos of California
- Ranchos of Los Angeles County
- Jose Dolores Sepulveda
- Portuguese Bend
