= Diego Sepúlveda Adobe =

19th-century Catholic missionary outpost

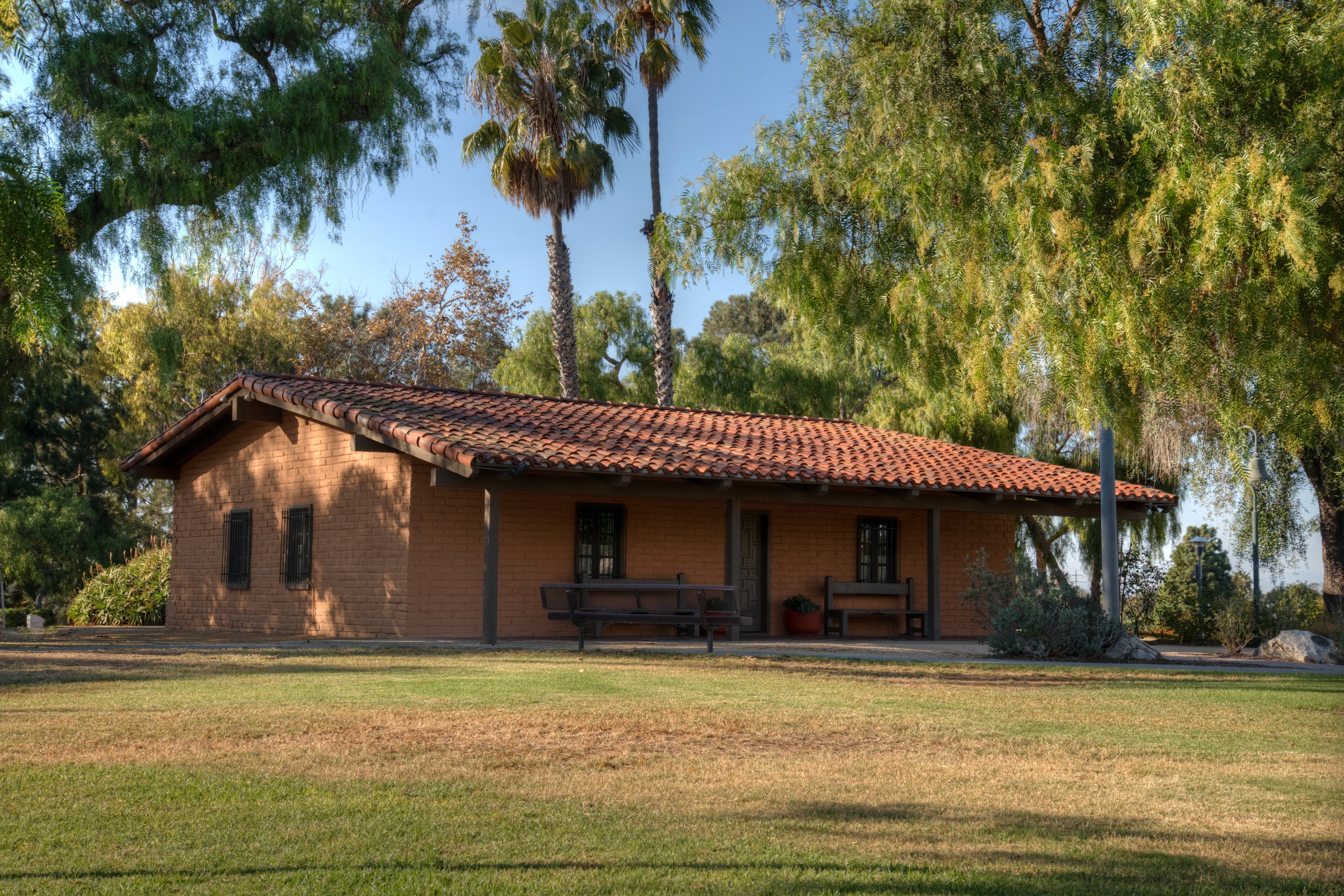

- Location within California
- Location: Costa Mesa, California
- Coordinates: 33°40′23″N 117°56′13″W
- Name as founded: Estancia de la Misión San Juan Capistrano
- English translation: Station of Mission San Juan Capistrano
- Military district: First
- Native tribe(s) Spanish name(s): Tongva; Gabrieliño
- Native place name: Lukup
- Governing body: City of Costa Mesa
- Current use: Museum

California Historical Landmark
- Reference no.: #227

Website
- https://costamesahistory.org/adobe.htm

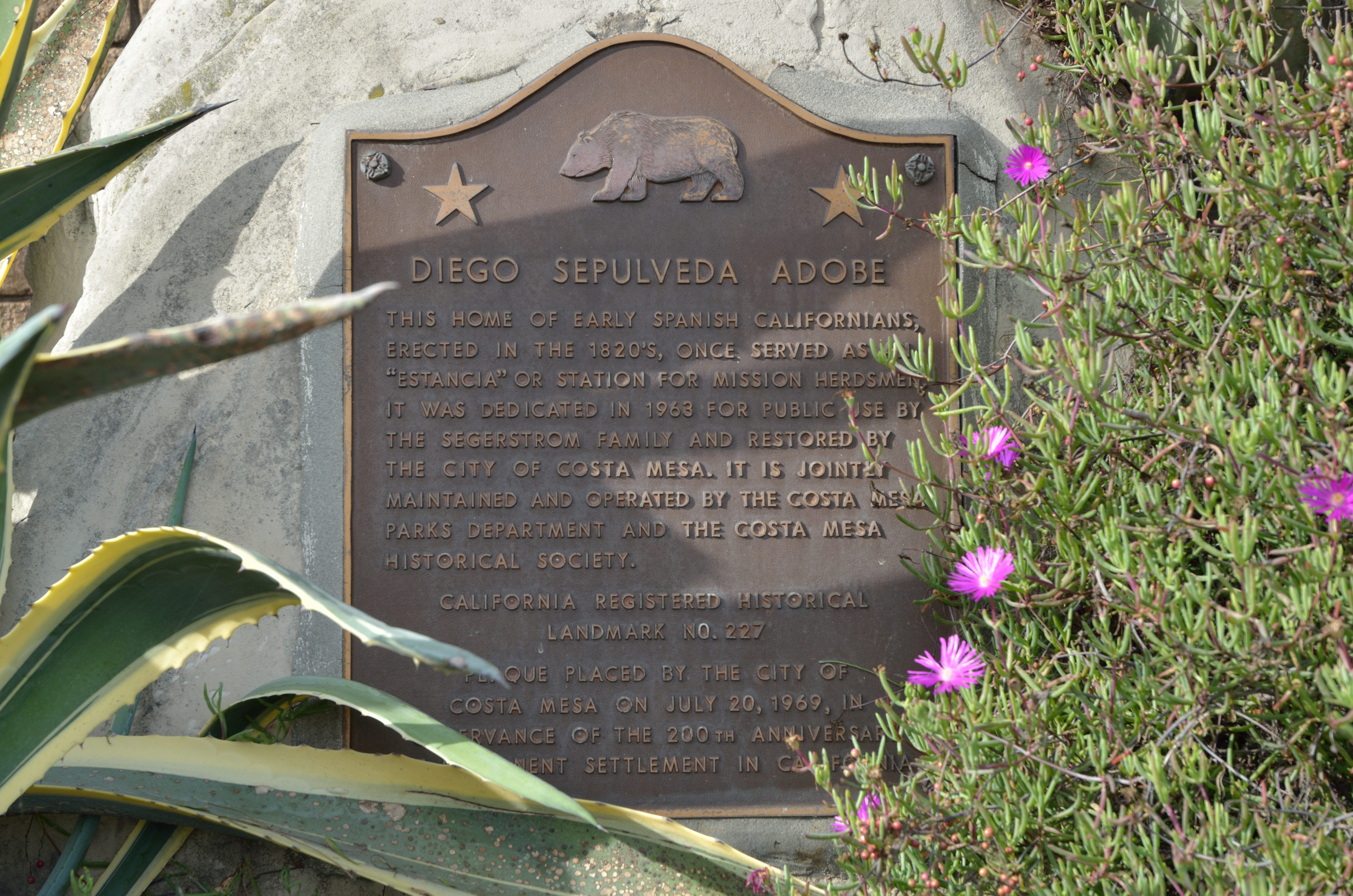
California Historical Landmark plaque at the adobe

The Diego Sepúlveda Adobe, sometimes called the Costa Mesa Estancia or the Santa Ana Estancia, is an adobe structure in Costa Mesa, Orange County, California. It is the second-oldest building still standing in the county.

== History ==
The adobe was built between 1817 and 1823 to house the mayordomo and herdsmen who tended the cattle and horses from Mission San Juan Capistrano to the south, in Alta California. The way-station was strategically situated on the banks of the Santa Ana River, some six leguas (Spanish Leagues) north of the parent mission, to overlook cattle grazing lands and the Tongva villagers of Lupukngna.

It served as a lookout post when the French privateer Hippolyte de Bouchard attacked San Juan Capistrano on December 14, 1818. By 1820 the building and its surrounding lands became an official estancia (mission station), where padres from the mission would visit regularly to bring "spiritual food" to the faithful.

After the Mexican secularization act of 1833 the church lost the land and building to the originally Spanish, later Mexican-recognized land grant Rancho Santiago de Santa Ana. The adobe and its surrounding property, a portion of Rancho Santiago de Santa Ana, were deeded by the U.S. government to Diego Sepúlveda around 1868. He was a former alcalde of the Mexican era Pueblo of Los Angeles.

== Present day ==
The adobe, which has been restored to its original style using original construction methods, is the second-oldest building still standing in Orange County. The Mission San Juan Capistrano's "Serra's Chapel" is the oldest.

The building then became a local history museum, operated by the Costa Mesa Historical Society.

== See also ==
- List of Spanish missions in California
- History of Orange County, California
- California Historical Landmarks in Orange County, California
- Ranchos of Orange County, California
- USNS Mission Santa Ana (AO-137) — a Mission Buenaventura Class fleet oiler built during World War II.

== Notes ==
=== References ===
- Kroeber, Alfred L. (1925). Handbook of the Indians of California. Dover Publications, Inc., New York, NY.
- Meadows, Don (June 1965). "Ghost Among the Tumbleweeds". Tumbleweeds to Roses. Archived from the original on October 8, 2007.
