= José Dolores Sepúlveda Adobe =

Jose Dolores Sepulveda Adobe
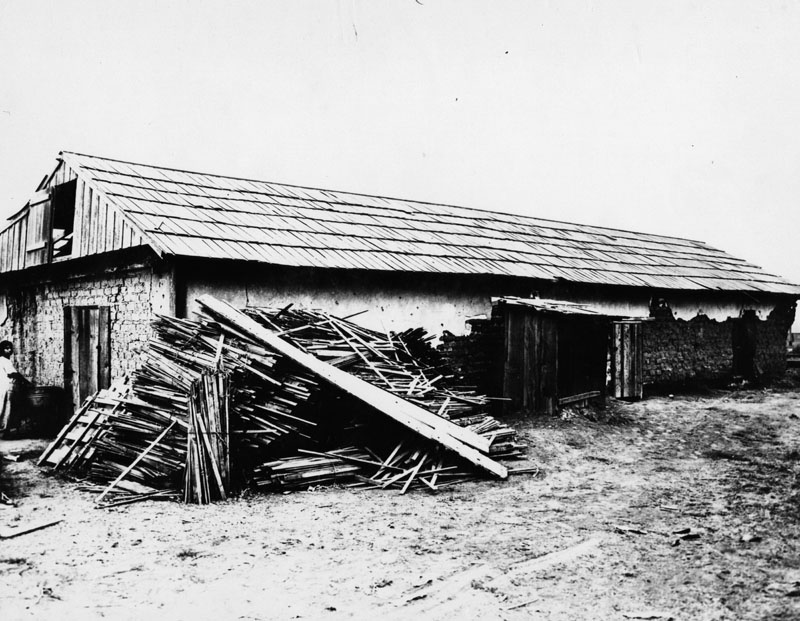
- Jose Dolores Sepulveda Adobe

- Location within the Los Angeles metropolitan area
- 33°47′49″N 118°20′53″W
- Location: Madison St. & Courtney Way, Torrance CA

History
- Built: 1839

California Historical Landmark
- Designated: Jan. 03, 1944
- Reference no.: 383

Jose Dolores Sepulveda Adobe is an adobe home built in 1818. It is located at the Rancho de los Palos Verdes in Torrance, California. The Jose Dolores Sepulveda Adobe was designated a California Historic Landmark (No. 383) on Jan. 03, 1944. The Jose Dolores Sepulveda Adobe was built by José Dolores Sepúlveda de Redondo, his son was Mayor of Los Angeles from 1837 to 1848. José Dolores Sepúlveda's father was José Loreto Sepúlveda (1764–1808). The location is now a private residence in Torrance. The original Adobe is gone, but the current homeowner renovated the house to reflect the Rancho history. Rancho de los Palos Verdes means "range of green trees". The Rancho is now the present-day cities of the Palos Verdes Peninsula, as well as portions of San Pedro and Torrance.

José Dolores Sepúlveda (March 23, 1793–1824) was one of the sons of Juan José Sepúlveda (1764–1808). In 1784, the Spanish Crown deeded Rancho San Pedro, a tract of over 75,000 acres (300 km^{2}), to soldier Juan José Domínguez. Domínguez died in 1809, and in 1810 the executor of his will, Manuel Gutiérrez, granted permission to then 17-year-old Sepúlveda to herd livestock in the southwestern reaches of Rancho San Pedro. This eventually became the basis for the Sepúlveda family's contested claim to the Rancho de los Palos Verdes, carved out of Rancho San Pedro lands. Dolores went to Monterey to settle his land title, but on his return trip in 1824 he was killed in the Chumash revolt at Mission La Purísima Concepción. In 1834, Governor José Figueroa made a judicial decree intended to settle the dispute between the Domínguez and Sepúlveda families, awarding the 31,629-acre (128 km^{2}) Rancho de los Palos Verdes to Juan Capistrano Sepúlveda and José Loreto Sepúlveda.

José Dolores Sepúlveda married María Ignacia Marcia Ávila (1793 - ?) on November 8, 1813, at Mission San Gabriel Arcángel.

== Marker ==
State maker reads:

- NO. 383 SITE OF ADOBE HOME OF JOSÉ DOLORES SEPULVEDA - This adobe was built in 1818. Dolores had trouble getting his land title cleared, so he took a trip to Monterey to get the matter definitely settled and, on his return trip, he was shot with an arrow by a hostile Indian at Mission La Purísima Concepción.

== See also ==
- California Historical Landmarks in Los Angeles County
- List of California Ranchos
- Ranchos of Los Angeles County, California
