= Old Whaling Station =

California historic landmark

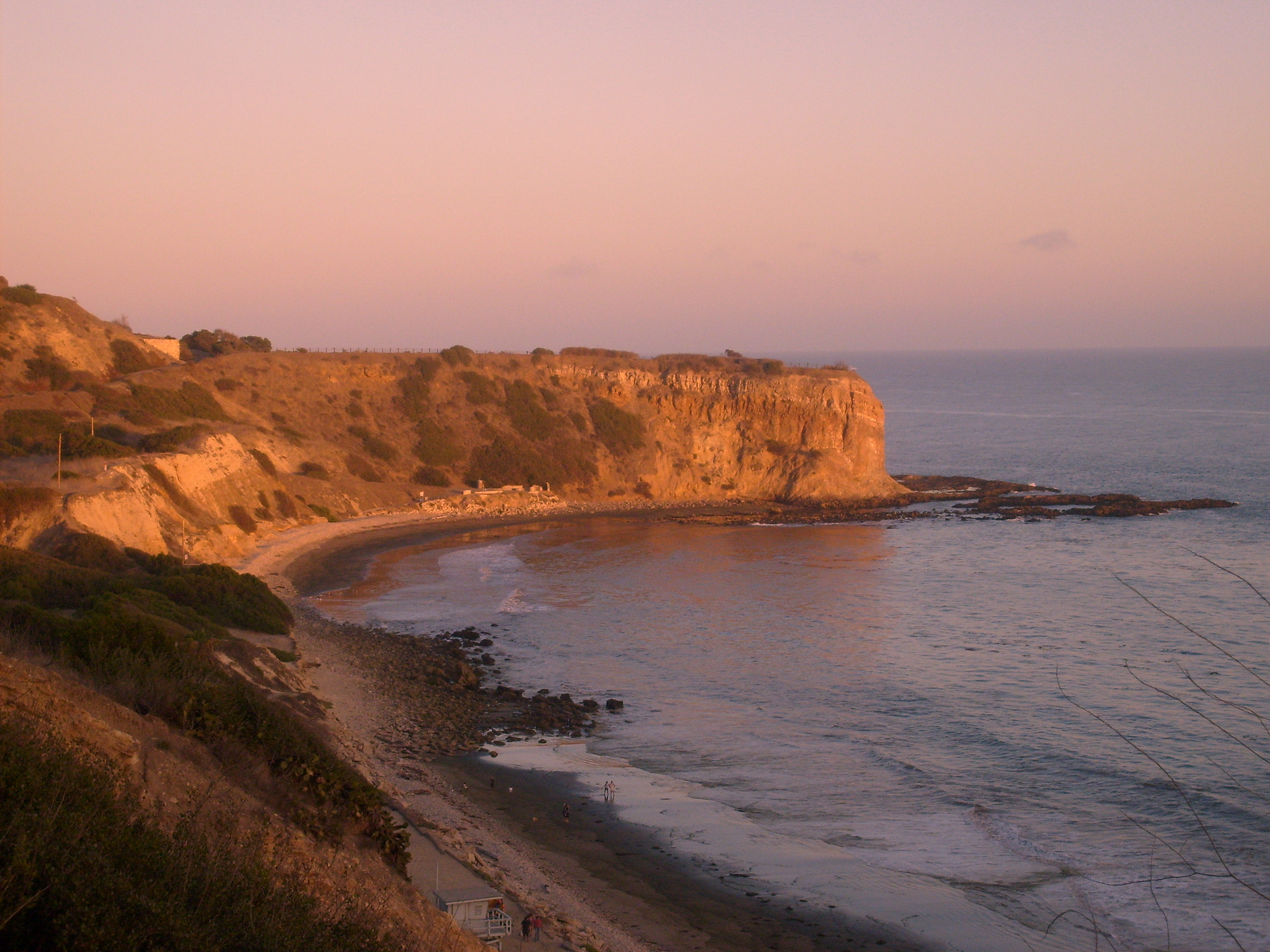
- Portuguese Point and Abalone Cove

- Location within the Los Angeles metropolitan area
- 33°44′05″N 118°21′16″W
- Location: Portuguese Bend in California

History
- Built: 1869

California Historical Landmark
- Designated: Jan. 3, 1944
- Reference no.: 381

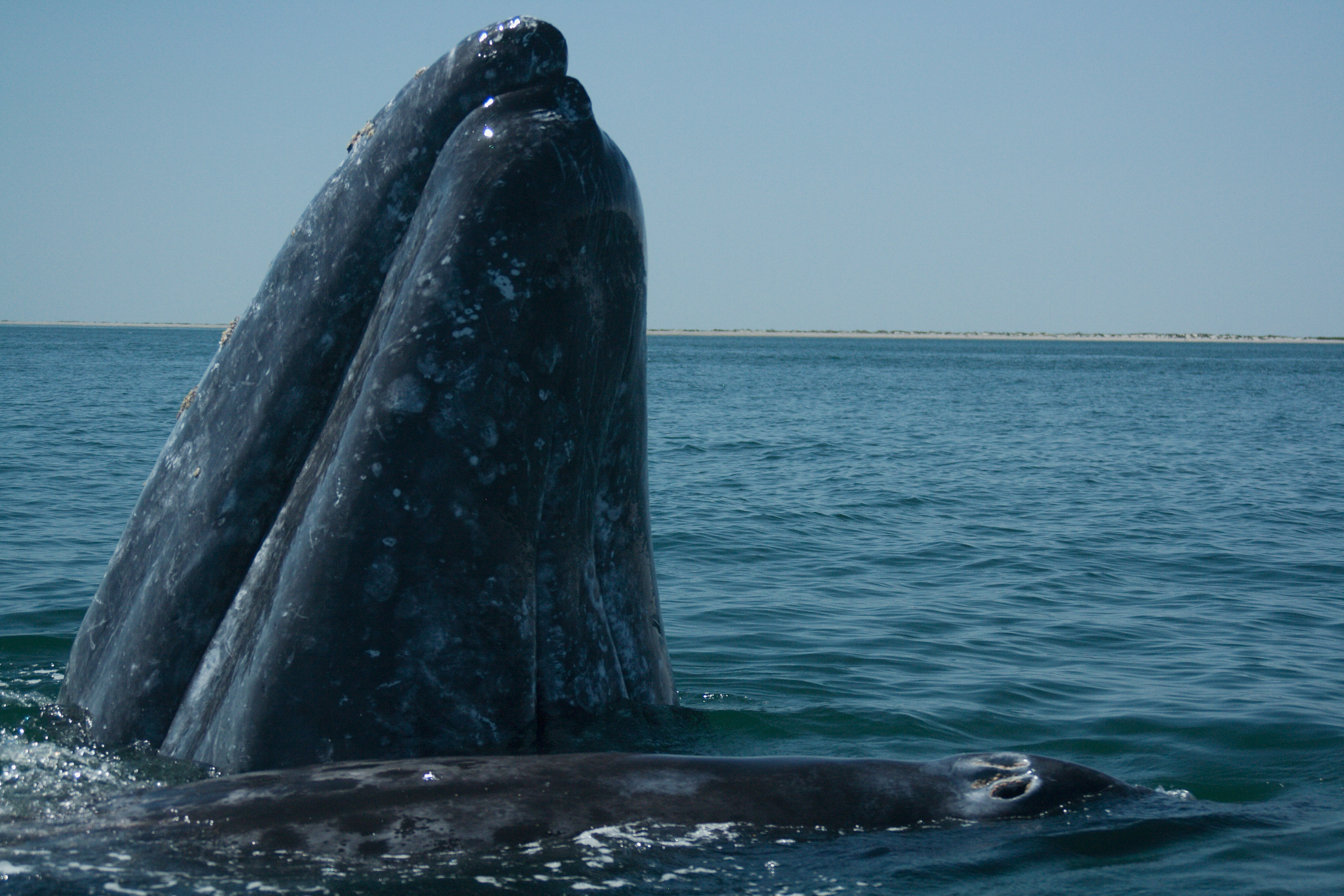
A Gray whale spy-hopping next to calf

A Gray whale size compared to an average human

The Old Whaling Station or Old Whaling Station Portuguese Bend was a whaling station in California, built in 1869. The Old Whaling Station was designated a California Historic Landmark (No.381) on Jan. 3, 1944. The Old Whaling Station at Portuguese Bend was located in what is now Portuguese Bend in Rancho Palos Verdes, California in Los Angeles County.

Portuguese Captain Frank Anderson processed 2,166 barrels of whale oil at this Historic Landmark from 1874 to 1877. In 1877 the station was abandoned. The whale stations had large kettles for rendering whale blubber into Whale oil, called tryworks. California's migrating whales were hunted in small boats from the station. Gray whales, as large as 36 tonnes, was the normal target. Hunting Gray whales in small boats was a very dangerous occupation, as many hunters were killed or injured. John Brown Whaling Company also operated at Portuguese Bend, starting in 1869. The last hunt was in 1885 due to the lack of the over hunted whales. Captain Joseph Clark is believed to have started the whaling industry in 1864. Gray whales were given protection from commercial hunting in 1949 by the International Whaling Commission (IWC) and are no longer hunted on a large scale.

Los Angeles had a real estate boom in 1887. At this time Portuguese Bend was studied to see if a harbor could feasibly be built there. Pioneers of Orange County, J.K. Tuffree "Colonel John Tuffree" (1842–1903) made plans for a harbor, town, and railroad service to Portuguese Bend. He gave the planned harbor the name “Port Carolina,” after his wife Carolina (Polhemus)Tuffree. The real estate boom ended before he could start building.

== Marker ==
Marker on the site reads:

- "O. 381 SITE OF OLD WHALING STATION – The whaling industry is said to have been started by Captain Clark in 1864. Captain Frank Anderson, a Portuguese, tried 2,166 barrels of whale oil at this station from 1874 to 1877. The station was abandoned because of a lack of fuel rather than vessels."

== See also ==
- California Historical Landmarks in Los Angeles County
- History of whaling
- History of Los Angeles
