= Site of Home of Diego Sepúlveda =

California historic landmark

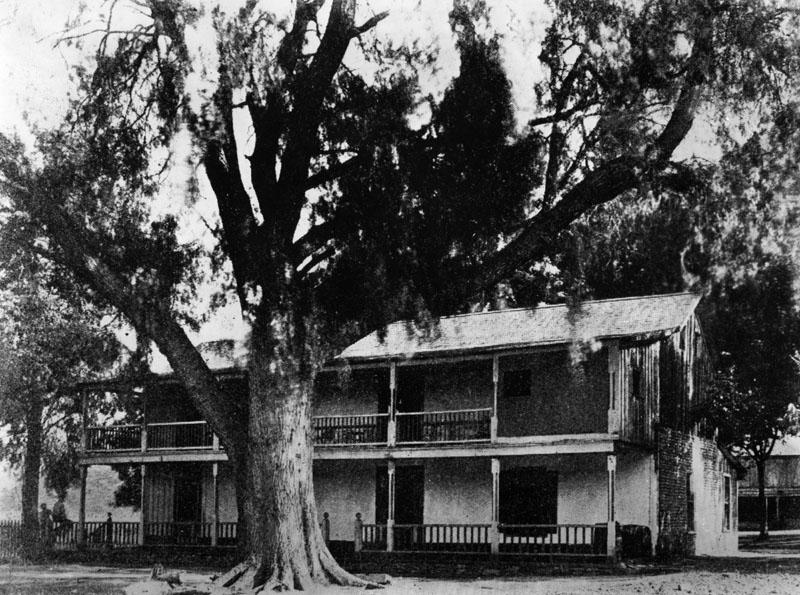
- Home of Diego Sepúlveda

- Location within the Los Angeles metropolitan area
- 33°45′2″N 118°17′32″W
- Location: 700 block of Channel St, San Pedro, CA

History
- Built: 1853

California Historical Landmark
- Designated: Jan. 3, 1944
- Reference no.: 380

Site of Home of Diego Sepúlveda is an adobe home, built by José Diego Sepúlveda (1820–1869) in 1853. This was the first two-story Monterey-type adobe built in Southern California. It was designated a California Historic Landmark (No. 380) on Jan. 3, 1944. It was located in what is now San Pedro, Los Angeles, California. Nothing remains of the home.

José Diego Sepúlveda was part owner of Rancho San Bernardino. José Diego Sepúlveda married María Francisca Elisalde at Mission San Gabriel Arcángel. Their eldest son was Román Dolores Sepúlveda (1851–1940). José Diego Sepúlveda was the son of José Dolores Sepúlveda (1793–1824) and María Ignacia Marcia Ávila.

== See also ==
- California Historical Landmarks in Los Angeles County
- List of California Ranchos
- Ranchos of Los Angeles County, California
