= Rancho San Joaquin =

Mexican land grant in California

Coordinates: 33.690°N 117.820°W

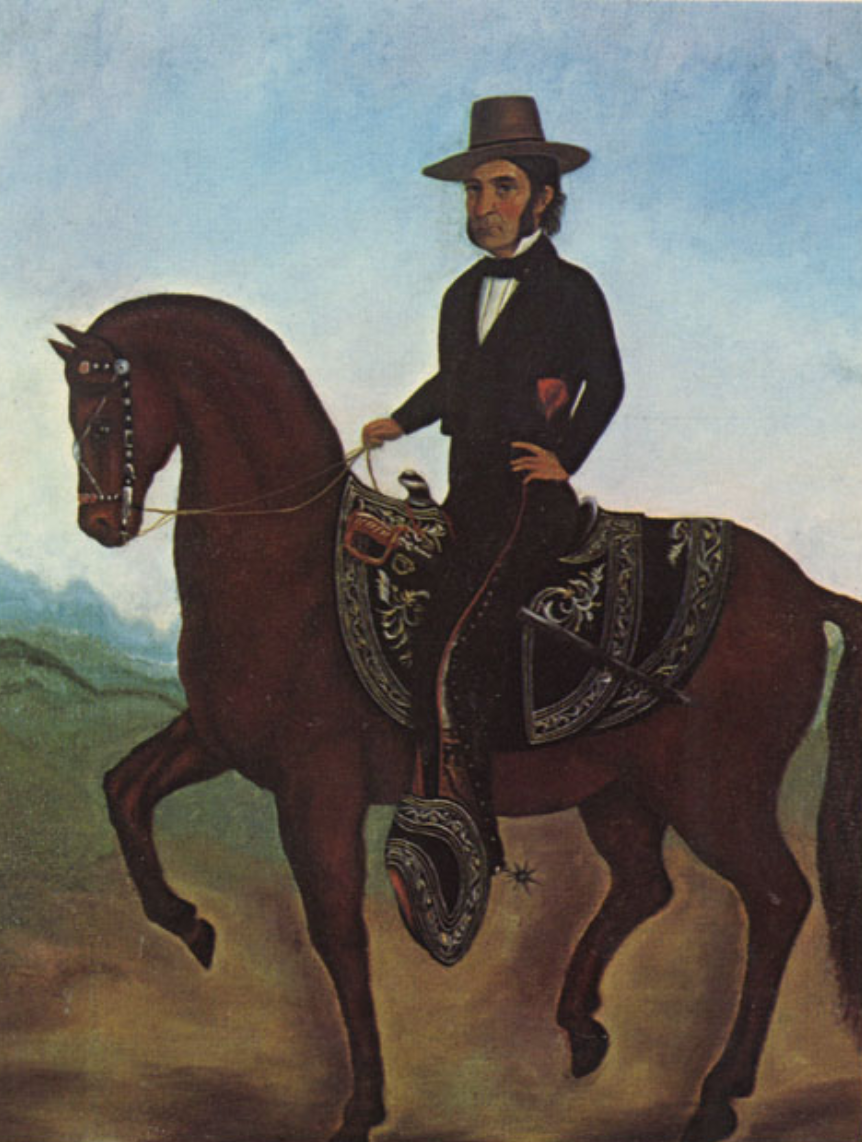
Rancho San Joaquín was granted in 1842 to José Andrés Sepúlveda, a famed Californio vaquero.

Rancho San Joaquin, the combined Rancho Cienega de las Ranas and Rancho Bolsa de San Joaquin, was a 48,803-acre (197.50 km^{2}) Mexican land grant in the San Joaquin Hills, within present-day Orange County, California.

It was granted to José Antonio Andres Sepúlveda. In Spanish Cienega de las Ranas means "Marsh of the Frogs" and Bolsa means "Pocket", and usually in reference to wetlands landforms.

== History ==
Rancho Cienega de las Ranas was granted to José Sepúlveda (1803–1875) by Mexican Alta California Governor Juan Bautista Alvarado in 1837. Rancho Cienega de las Ranas encompassed present-day Irvine and the San Joaquin Hills. Additional land, Rancho La Bolsa de San Joaquín, was granted to Sepúlveda in 1842. Rancho Bolsa de San Joaquin encompassed Newport Bay and estuary in present-day Newport Beach southeast to Laguna Canyon Creek flowing to present-day Laguna Beach.

Together these two ranchos formed Rancho San Joaquín.

With the cession of California to the United States following the Mexican–American War, the 1848 Treaty of Guadalupe Hidalgo provided that the land grants would be honored. As required by the Land Act of 1851, a claim for Rancho San Joaquin was filed with the Public Land Commission in 1852, and the grant was patented to José Sepulveda in 1867.

Following the drought in 1864, José Andrés Sepúlveda sold Rancho San Joaquin to Benjamin and Thomas Flint, Llewellyn Bixby and James Irvine, and it eventually became part of the Irvine Ranch.

== See also ==
- Ranchos of Orange County, California
