= Francisco Xavier Sepúlveda =

Francisco Xavier Sepúlveda-García (/fɾanˈθisko xaˈβjeɾ sepulβeðaɣaɾˈθia/ fran-SIS-ko sa-BYER seh-POOL-beh-dah-gar-SEE-ah) (1747–1788) was a Mexican colonial military officer and founder of the Sepúlveda family of California, a prominent Californio family of Southern California.

== Life ==
He was born in Villa de Sinaloa, Mexico, the son of Juan José Sepúlveda (born 1720) and Ana María Josefa García (born 1720).

He married María Candelaria de Redondo in 1762.

In 1781, the couple and their 6 children accompanied the José de Züñiga Expedition into upper Las Californias.

Francisco Xavier Sepúlveda died in the Pueblo de Los Ángeles and was buried at the Mission San Gabriel Arcángel cemetery on 26 January 1788.

== Children ==
His descendants formed the powerful Sepúlveda family of California, one of the most prominent Californio families of Southern California.

Sepúlveda's eldest son, Juan José Sepúlveda (1764–1808), and his fifth son, Francisco Sepúlveda °(1775–1853), became progenitors of two distinguished branches of the family. Sepulveda Boulevard, the longest street in the City and County of Los Angeles, is named for the Sepúlveda family.
