= List of museums in Los Angeles County, California =

A list of museums located within Los Angeles County of Southern California.

Museums located within the City of Los Angeles, while also within LA County, are found separately listed on the List of museums in Los Angeles, California.

The list includes museums and art galleries — of historical, cultural, ethnic, science, and arts organizations, nonprofit organizations, government departments, university and college facilities, and private or corporate collections — that have galleries, buildings, and or open air spaces with exhibits and works open for public viewing.

It currently does not include virtual museums, although some of the listed physical museums have notable online collections also.

== Museums ==
=== Current ===
Name	Image	Town/City	Region	Type	Summary
Adamson House		Malibu	Greater Los Angeles Area	Historic house	1929 home decorated with Malibu Potteries tile, tour includes adjoining Malibu Lagoon Museum in the former garage, with exhibits of local history
Adobe de Palomares		Pomona	San Gabriel Valley	Historic house	1850s adobe ranch home, operated by the Historical Society of Pomona Valley
Alhambra Historical Society Museum		Alhambra	San Gabriel Valley	Local history	Located in Burke Heritage Park
The American Military Museum		El Monte	San Gabriel Valley	Military	website, military vehicles and artillery
American Museum of Ceramic Art		Pomona	San Gabriel Valley	Art	Also known as AMOCA, collection includes Southern California dinnerware, Mettach ceramics, industrial ceramics, factory made ceramics, ancient vessels from the Americas, fine porcelains of Asia and Europe, and functional and sculptural contemporary ceramics
Antelope Valley College Art Gallery		Lancaster	Antelope Valley	Art	website, located in building FA1, the Fine Arts Building
Antelope Valley Indian Museum State Historic Park		Lake Los Angeles	Antelope Valley	Native American	objects created by the American Indian cultures of the western Great Basin, California and the Southwest
Armory Center for the Arts		Pasadena	San Gabriel Valley	Art	
Art Center College of Design Galleries		Pasadena	San Gabriel Valley	Art	Includes the Alyce de Roulet Williamson Gallery, Public Programs Gallery and Lobby, Student Gallery, Undergraduate Fine Art Galleries, Wind Tunnel Gallery
Automobile Driving Museum		El Segundo	South Bay	Automotive	restored antique, classic and special interest cars
Baldwin Park Museum		Baldwin Park	San Gabriel Valley	Local history	Operated by the Baldwin Park Historical Society, located inside the Arts and Recreation Center
Battleship IOWA Museum		San Pedro	Los Angeles Harbor Region	Maritime Museum / Ship	Operated by the Pacific Battleship Center, the USS Iowa (BB-61) served during WWII, Korean War, and the Cold War, and hosted 3 Presidents (President Franklin D. Roosevelt, President Ronald Reagan, and President George H. W. Bush.)
Bert Rodriguez Museum		West Hollywood	Westside	Art	website
Blackbird Airpark Museum		Palmdale	Antelope Valley	Aviation	annex of the Air Force Flight Test Museum at Edwards AFB, museum and outdoor displays including a Lockheed SR-71A, a D-21 drone and a U2 “D”; near the Joe Davies Heritage Airpark
Bunny Museum		Altadena	San Gabriel Valley	Commodity	Over 26,000 bunny collectibles
Burbank Police and Fire Museum		Burbank	San Fernando Valley	Multiple	Open to the public one Saturday a month
California Heritage Museum		Santa Monica	Westside	Art	American decorative and fine arts, includes Monterey Furniture and many examples of California tile and pottery
Carolyn Campagna Kleefeld Contemporary Art Museum		California State University, Long Beach			
Casa Adobe de San Rafael		Glendale	San Fernando Valley	Historic house	information, owned by the City of Glendale
Catalina Island Museum		Santa Catalina Island	Los Angeles Harbor Region	Local history	Located in the Catalina Casino, includes Native American artifacts, over 10,000 photographs and images, a large collection of Catalina-made pottery and tile, ship models and maritime artifacts
Centennial Heritage Park		Glendora	San Gabriel Valley	Open air	Operated by the Glendora Preservation Foundation, includes Hamilton House, carriage house, windmill, citrus grove, print shop
Claremont Museum of Art		Claremont	San Gabriel Valley	Art	website
Clarke Estate		Santa Fe Springs	Gateway Cities	Historic house	
Craft Contemporary		Mid-Wilshire	Los Angeles	Art	Located on Miracle Mile, it is Los Angeles' only arts institution dedicated to craft
dA Center for the Arts		Pomona	San Gabriel Valley	Art	website, community arts center with exhibitions
Descanso Gardens		La Cañada Flintridge	San Gabriel Valley	Historic house	Botanic gardens, also features Boddy House, a 22-room mansion
Destination Crenshaw		Hyde Park	South Los Angeles	open-air museum	1.3-mile-long (2.1 km) portion of Crenshaw Boulevard preserving the history and culture of African Americans
Doctors House Museum		Glendale	San Fernando Valley	Historic house	late 19th-century Victorian house, operated by the Glendale Historical Society
Dominguez Rancho Adobe Museum		Rancho Dominguez	Los Angeles Harbor Region	Historic house	Adobe ranch home, also known as Rancho San Pedro
Downey History Center		Downey	Gateway Cities	Local history	website, operated by the Downey Historical Society
Duarte Historical Museum		Duarte	San Gabriel Valley	Local history	Operated by the Duarte Historical Society
Durrell House Museum		Azusa	San Gabriel Valley	Historic house	Also known as Azusa Historical Museum, operated by the Azusa Historical Society
El Monte Historical Museum		El Monte	San Gabriel Valley	Local history	website
Firehouse Jail Museum		Covina	San Gabriel Valley	Local history	Operated by the Covina Valley Historical Society, former jail, features orange industry documents and artifacts
Forest Lawn Memorial Park, Glendale		Glendale	San Fernando Valley	Art	The Forest Lawn Museum exhibits western bronzes, stained glass, historical American pieces, original paintings and cultural artifacts, with specific displays for different locations around the world
Frederick R. Weisman Museum of Art, California		Malibu	Greater Los Angeles Area	Art	Part of Pepperdine University, works from the collections of the Frederick R. Weisman Art Foundation
Gallery 825		West Hollywood	Westside	Art	Operated by the Los Angeles Art Association
Gamble House		Pasadena	San Gabriel Valley	Historic house	1908 Craftsman-style house
George Westmore Research Library & Museum		Burbank	San Fernando Valley	Cosmetics	website, cosmetics and hair styling memorabilia, currently closed and seeking new location
Gilb Museum of Arcadia Heritage		Arcadia	San Gabriel Valley	Local history	website
Gilbert Sproul Museum		Norwalk	Gateway Cities	Local history	Operated by the City of Norwalk, open on the first Sunday of the month
Glendora Historical Society Museum		Glendora	San Gabriel Valley	Local history	website
Gordon R. Howard Museum		Burbank	San Fernando Valley	Local history	Operated by the Burbank Historical Society, includes the 1887 Victorian Mentzer House, a memorabilia building including a Lockheed Aviation display, vintage vehicles, 19th century era rooms
Hargitt House Museum		Norwalk	Gateway Cities	Historic house	Operated by the City of Norwalk, late 19th-century Victorian house, open on the first and third Saturdays of the month
Hathaway Ranch Museum		Santa Fe Springs	Gateway Cities	Local history	Early California ranch life and the oil boom of the 20s and 30s
Hayes House & Museum		San Gabriel	San Gabriel Valley	Local history	Operated by the San Gabriel Historical Association
Heritage House, Covina		Covina	San Gabriel Valley	Historic house	Operated by the Covina Valley Historical Society, early 20th-century period Craftsman-style home
Heritage Junction Historic Park		Santa Clarita	Santa Clarita Valley	Open air	operated by the Santa Clarita Valley Historical Society, includes several historic houses, a railroad station, schoolhouse, chapel
Heritage Park		Santa Fe Springs	Gateway Cities	Open air	includes authentic Tongva Native American village, ranch home, and train depot complete with locomotive
Hermosa Beach Historical Museum		Hermosa Beach	South Bay	Local history	Operated by the Hermosa Beach Historical Society
Historical Society of Long Beach Museum		Long Beach	Los Angeles Harbor Region	Local history	
Huntington Library		San Marino	San Gabriel Valley	Multiple	Library, art collection, historic Beaux-Art mansion and botanical gardens
Hurst Ranch Historical Center		West Covina	San Gabriel Valley	Agriculture	website, early 20th century ranch and farm with equipment, tools
International Printing Museum		Carson	Los Angeles Harbor Region	History	Working demonstrations of antique printing machines, history of books and printing, inventions and inventors that have changed the world
Joe Davies Heritage Airpark		Palmdale	Antelope Valley	Aviation	outdoor display of military and civilian aircraft flown, tested, designed, produced or modified at United States Air Force Plant 42
Justice Brothers Private Automotive Collection		Duarte	San Gabriel Valley	Automotive	History of the Justice Brothers and auto racing
Kidspace Children's Museum		Pasadena	San Gabriel Valley	Children's	
La Casa Primera de Rancho San Jose		Pomona	San Gabriel Valley	Historic house	1837 adobe home, operated by the Historical Society of Pomona Valley
La Historia Historical Society Museum		El Monte	San Gabriel Valley	Ethnic	Culture of the barrios of El Monte
Lancaster Museum of Art and History		Lancaster	Antelope Valley	Multiple	also known as MOAH, three locations focusing on the art, history and culture in the Antelope Valley, includes the Western Hotel Museum
Lanterman House		La Cañada Flintridge	San Gabriel Valley	Historic house	1915 Arts & Crafts-style bungalow
Latino Art Museum		Pomona	San Gabriel Valley	Art	website, Latin American contemporary art
Leonis Adobe		Calabasas	San Fernando Valley	Living	California ranch life of the late 19th century
Lomita Railroad Museum		Lomita	South Bay	Railroad	Steam locomotives
Long Beach Firefighter's Museum		Long Beach	Los Angeles Harbor Region	Firefighting	website
Long Beach Museum of Art		Long Beach	Los Angeles Harbor Region	Art	American decorative arts objects, early 20th-century European art, California Modernism and contemporary art of California
Lopez Adobe		San Fernando	San Fernando Valley	Historic house	
MAK Center for Art and Architecture		West Hollywood	Westside	Art	Changing exhibits that challenge the relationship between art and architecture; located in the Schindler House
Mayme A. Clayton Library & Museum		Culver City	Westside	African-American	history and culture of African Americans in the United States, with a special focus on Southern California and the American West, collections of Mayme Agnew Clayton
Manhattan Beach Historical Society Museum		Manhattan Beach	South Bay	Local history	Located in the cottage at Polliwog Park
Martial Arts History Museum		Glendale	San Fernando Valley	Multiple	A historic and cultural look at Asian art, history, music and culture and its impact on American society
Mission San Gabriel Arcángel		San Gabriel	San Gabriel Valley	Historic church	Also contains a museum about the church's history
Monrovia Historical Museum		Monrovia	San Gabriel Valley	Local history	
Monterey Park Historical Museum		Monterey Park	San Gabriel Valley	Local history	Operated by the Monterey Park Historical Society
MOCA at The Pacific Design Center		West Hollywood	Westside	Art	Presents new work by emerging and established artists, branch of Museum of Contemporary Art, Los Angeles
Museum of Flying		Santa Monica	Westside	Local history	Includes 50 vintage aircraft, and the desk/office of Donald Wills Douglas, Sr. and executive boardroom of Douglas Aircraft Company, which was headquartered in Santa Monica
Museum of Jurassic Technology		Culver City	Westside	Art	This is a meta-museum, full of loving irony. Includes a Russian Tea Room.
Museum of Latin American Art		Long Beach	Los Angeles Harbor Region	Art	Contemporary Latin American art
Museum of Neon Art		Glendale	San Fernando Valley	Art	Art that incorporates neon lighting including neon signs and kinetic art
Nan Rae Gallery Woodbury University		Burbank	San Fernando Valley	Art	website,
Neff Park		La Mirada	Gateway Cities	Local history	website, contains Neff Home, a historic house museum, and Neff Barn with local history exhibits
Norton Simon Museum		Pasadena	San Gabriel Valley	Art	Collections include European Impressionist paintings, sculpture, tapestry and some South Asian sculpture
Old Mill		San Marino	San Gabriel Valley	Mill	1816 adobe grist mill for Mission San Gabriel, also known as El Molino Viejo Museum
Oldest McDonald's Restaurant		Downey	Gateway Cities	Food	Third McDonald's restaurant, features original design and museum
ONE National Gay & Lesbian Archives		West Hollywood	Westside	LGBT	Exhibitions of LGBT art, photography and history from the archives, part of the University of Southern California Libraries
Pacific Railroad Society Museum		San Dimas	San Gabriel Valley	Railroad	website, operates from former San Dimas AT&SF Depot
Pacific Island Ethnic Art Museum		Long Beach	Los Angeles Harbor Region	Art	website, art works and artifacts from Pacific islander nations
Paley Center for Media		Beverly Hills	Westside	Media	Formerly the Museum of Television & Radio
Palos Verdes Art Center		Rancho Palos Verdes	South Bay	Art	community visual art gallery and school
Pasadena City College Art Gallery		Pasadena	San Gabriel Valley	Art	website
Pasadena Museum of California Art		Pasadena	San Gabriel Valley	Art	Art and design that originates from California
Pasadena Museum of History		Pasadena	San Gabriel Valley	Multiple	Includes Fenyes Mansion with turn-of-the-20th-century furnishings and art, the Finnish Folk Art Museum and changing exhibits of local culture and history
Paul Gray PC Museum		Claremont	San Gabriel Valley	Technology	Part of Claremont Graduate University, history of personal computers, located in the Center for Information Systems and Technology
Pico Rivera Historical Museum		Pico Rivera	San Gabriel Valley	Local history	information, housed in an 1887 train depot, operated by the Pico Rivera History and Heritage Society
Pio Pico State Historic Park		Whittier	San Gabriel Valley	Historic house	Adobe home of Pío Pico, the last Governor of Alta California under Mexican Rule
Point Vicente Interpretive Center		Rancho Palos Verdes	South Bay	Natural history	website, adjacent to Point Vicente Light, natural and cultural history of the peninsula with a special emphasis on the Pacific gray whale
Point Vicente Light		Rancho Palos Verdes	South Bay	Maritime	Lighthouse tours
Benton Museum of Art		Claremont	San Gabriel Valley	Art	Part of Pomona College; collection includes 15th- and 16th-century Italian panel paintings, Pre-Columbian to 20th-century American Indian art and artifacts, American and European prints, drawings, and photographs
Pomona Ebell Museum of History		Pomona	San Gabriel Valley	Local history	website, operated by the Historical Society of Pomona Valley
Queen Mary		Long Beach	Los Angeles Harbor Region	Museum ship	Ocean liner
RailGiants Train Museum		Pomona	San Gabriel Valley	Railroad	Located at Fairplex, historic locomotives
Ramona Museum of California History		San Gabriel	San Gabriel Valley	History	website, California history, operated by the Native Sons of the Golden West
Rancho Los Alamitos		Long Beach	Los Angeles Harbor Region	Historic house	Early 19th century adobe ranch house and barns with animals
Rancho Los Cerritos		Long Beach	Los Angeles Harbor Region	Historic house	1844 two-story Monterey-style adobe home
Raymond M. Alf Museum of Paleontology		Claremont	San Gabriel Valley	Paleontology	Part of The Webb Schools, vertebrate, invertebrate, and track fossils
Redondo Beach Historical Museum		Redondo Beach	Greater Los Angeles Area	Local history	Located in the 1904 Queen Anne House
Richardson House and Lizzie's Trail Inn		Sierra Madre	San Gabriel Valley	Historic site	website, operated by the Sierra Madre Historical Preservation Society
Rowland Home & Dibble Museum		Hacienda Heights	San Gabriel Valley	Historic house	Currently closed
Rubel Castle		Glendora	San Gabriel Valley	Art	Eclectic mix of rock buildings, discarded items and a renovated citrus packing house
Ruth Chandler Williamson Gallery		Claremont	San Gabriel Valley	Art	Part of Scripps College, collection focuses on contemporary ceramics; American 19th and early 20th century paintings and works on paper; American, European, and Japanese prints; photography; Asian paintings and decorative arts
Salvation Army Museum of the West		Rancho Palos Verdes	South Bay	History	history of the Salvation Army in the Western United States
San Dimas Museum		San Dimas	San Gabriel Valley	Local history	Operated by the San Dimas Historical Society
San Gabriel River Discovery Center		South El Monte	San Gabriel Valley	Natural history	planned museum to complement the existing Whittier Narrows Nature Center, focus on local watershed issues
Santa Monica History Museum		Santa Monica	Westside	Local history	operated by the Santa Monica Historical Society
Santa Monica Museum of Art		Santa Monica	Westside	Art	Contemporary art
Saugus Train Station Museum		Santa Clarita	Santa Clarita Valley	Railroad	website, operated by the Santa Clarita Valley Historical Society at Heritage Junction Park
Schindler House		West Hollywood	Westside	Historic house	Designed by architect Rudolf Schindler, also features the MAK Center for Art and Architecture
South Pasadena Historical Museum		South Pasadena	San Gabriel Valley	Local	website, operated by the South Pasadena Preservation Foundation
Southern California Medical Museum		Pomona	San Gabriel Valley	Medical	located at Western University of Health Sciences, history, photos and artifacts of medicine, dentistry, pharmacy, nursing and allied medical fields
Taylor House		West Covina	San Gabriel Valley	Historic house	website, 1912 Craftsman style farmhouse
Temple City Historical Museum		Temple City	San Gabriel Valley	Local history	website, operated by the Historical Society of Temple City
The Museum of the San Fernando Valley		Northridge	San Fernando Valley	History, Art & Culture	exhibits on The Art of Tarzan, Birmingham General Hospital, Then and Now, African American History in the SFV
Torrance Art Museum		Torrance	South Bay	Art	website modern and contemporary art
Torrance Historical Society & Museum		Torrance	South Bay	Local history	
Toyota USA Automobile Museum		Torrance	South Bay	Automobile	Toyota automobiles and history, open by appointment only
University Art Museum		Long Beach	Los Angeles Harbor Region	Art	on the campus of California State University, Long Beach
USC Pacific Asia Museum		Pasadena	San Gabriel Valley	Art	Arts and culture of Asia and the Pacific Islands
Vincent Price Art Museum		Monterey Park	Eastside	Art	part of East Los Angeles College, includes art from Africa, Peruvian and Mexican artifacts dating from 300 B.C., North American Indian Art, and important works from the renaissance to the present day
Virginia Robinson Gardens		Beverly Hills	Westside	Historic house	Early 20th century period landscape, historic mansion and botanical gardens
Wally Parks NHRA Motorsports Museum		Pomona	San Gabriel Valley	Automotive	Memorabilia, automobiles and motorcycles related to the sport of hot rodding
Warner Bros. Museum		Burbank	San Fernando Valley	Media	Part of the VIP Tour of Warner Brothers Studio, motion picture and television memorabilia
Wende Museum		Culver City	Westside	History	History and culture of the Cold War, particularly in East Germany, Eastern Europe and the Soviet Union
Western Museum of Flight		Torrance	South Bay	Aviation	Operated by the Southern California Historical Aviation Foundation, collection of notable jet and propeller-drive airplanes
Whittier Museum		Whittier	San Gabriel Valley	Historic house	Operated by the Whittier Historical Society
William S. Hart Ranch and Museum		Santa Clarita	Santa Clarita Valley	Historic house	Spanish-revival home of William S. Hart, contains original furnishings, western art, mementos of early Hollywood and Native American artifacts; operated by the Natural History Museum of Los Angeles County
Workman and Temple Family Homestead Museum		Industry	San Gabriel Valley	Historic house	Features the 1870s Workman House, 1920s La Casa Nueva, a Spanish Colonial Revival mansion, and El Campo Santo, one of the region's oldest private cemeteries

=== Former ===
- Academy of Motion Picture Arts and Sciences Galleries
- Downey Museum of Art, Downey, website, closed in 2009 and seeking new location
- Eames Office, Santa Monica
- Angels Attic, closed in 2017

== See also ==
- List of museums in the City of Los Angeles, California
- Lists of museums in California
- Museums in Los Angeles County, California
- Art in Greater Los Angeles
