= Fenyes =

Fenyes may refer to:

- Feneș (Fényes), a village of Armeniș, a commune in Romania
- Fenyes Estate, a historic two-acre estate complex located at 160-170 Orange Grove Boulevard in Pasadena, California

people

- Adalbert Fenyes (1863–1937), Hungarian entomologist
- Adolf Fényes (1867–1945), Hungarian painter
- Imre Fényes (1917–1977), Hungarian physicist
- Szabolcs Fényes (1912–1986), Hungarian composer of film scores
