= Acequia Madre (Santa Fe) =

Historical irrigation ditch in New Mexico

- Mother Ditch
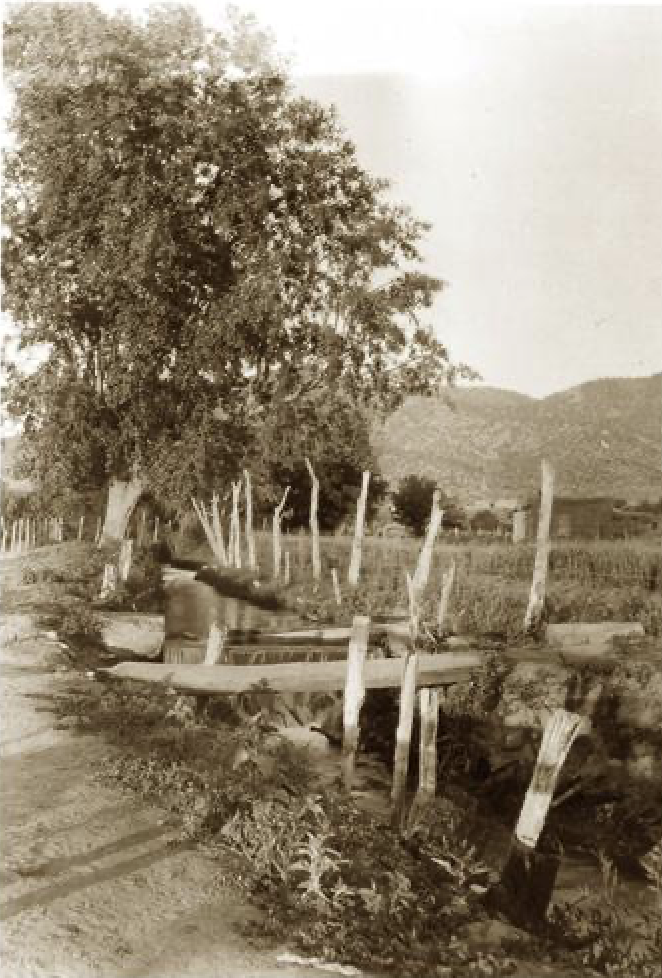
- Acequia Madre (Mother Ditch), Santa Fe, NM c.1890-1910

- Location within New Mexico
- 35.679387°N 105.92349°W
- Location: Santa Fe, New Mexico, USA

History
- Built: c.1610
- Built for: irrigation
- Rebuilt: c.1680

Site notes
- Elevation: 7,000 ft (2,100 m)

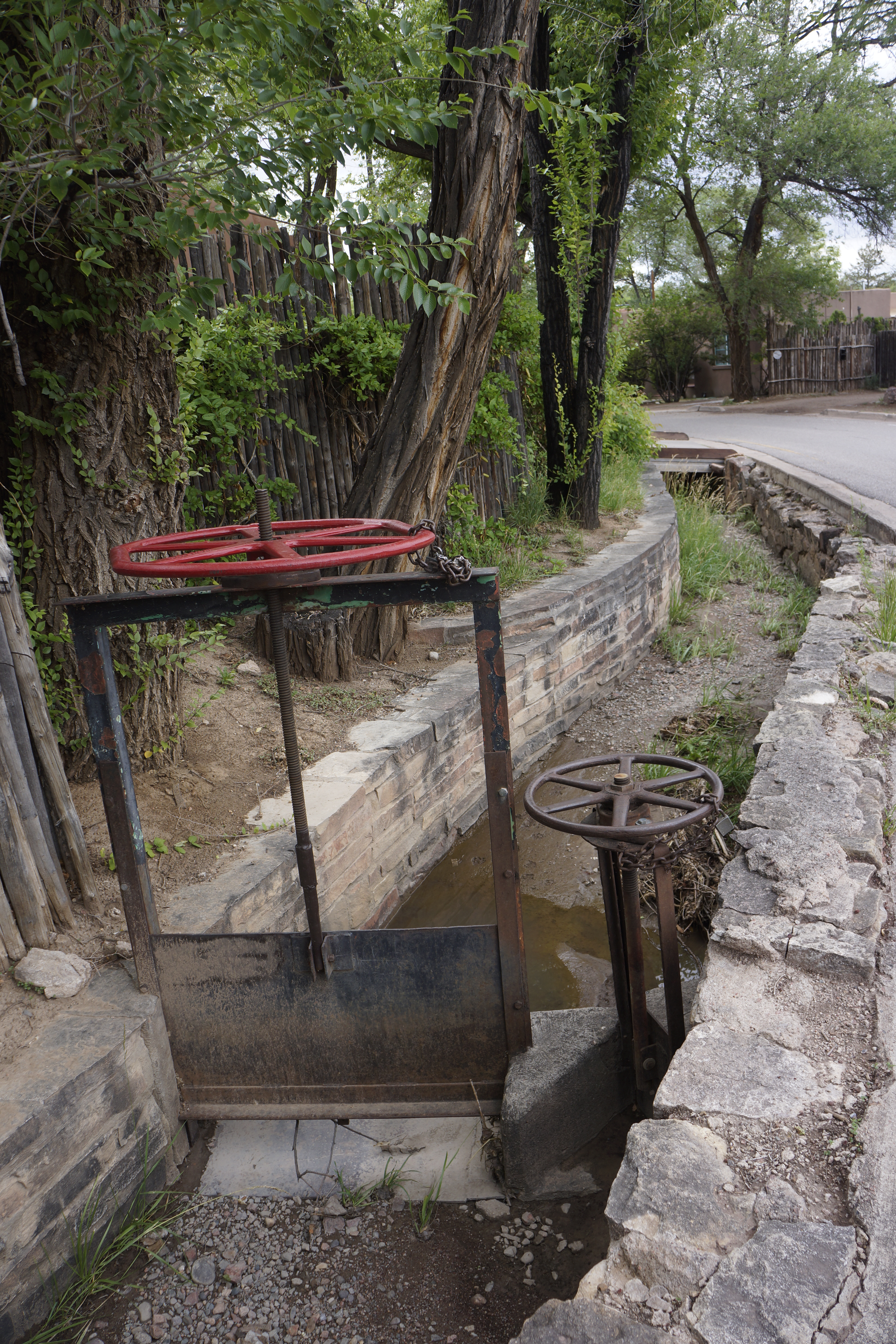
A section of the Acequia Madre in 2022 showing gate to control water flow

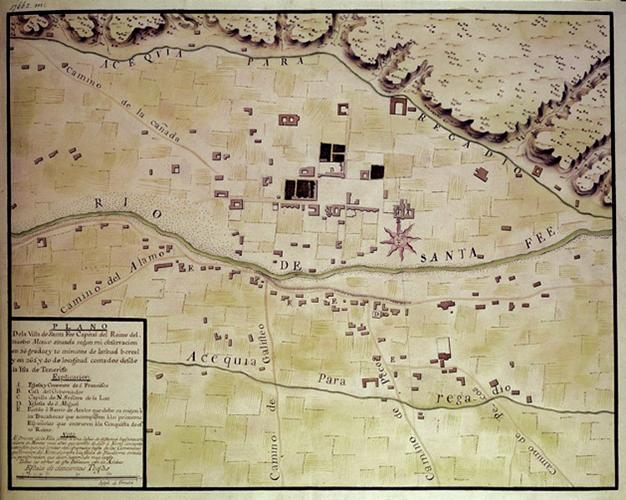
Urrutia Map of Santa Fe, 1766, showing the Acequia Madre in the lower third of the map

The Acequia Madre (Mother Ditch) is a historical irrigation ditch that flows through the city of Santa Fe, New Mexico. It has been operating for more than 500 years, and is part of the acequia system found throughout New Mexico.

== History ==
Historically, ditch irrigation was used for centuries by the indigenous peoples of the Southwest, however the Spanish colonialists have been credited with bringing knowledge of engineering and irrigation/water regulation law to New Mexico. The Acequia Madre was documented in the José de Urrutia map (c. 1766) which shows the acequia running along the muralla, or early fortification wall of Santa Fe, and marks its position in relation to the Santa Fe River.

The structure dates from before 1610, however the main construction occurred in 1680 around the time of the Pueblo Revolt. At that time Santa Fe was called La Villa Real de la Santa Fé de San Francisco de Asís. The indigenous Puebloan peoples in the area used flood control practices and irrigation as far back as 800 AD as observed by the Spanish explorers who came through the area in the 1540s.

The acequia continues to this day to be governed by early Spanish laws. The ditch has a board of three commissioners charged with ensuring it is kept in good-working order and a Spanish: mayordomo de la acequia. The acequia is still used by some residents to irrigate grazing land and fruit trees; property owners with water rights leases along the ditch pay an annual fee, and are responsible for keeping the acequia cleared of debris each spring; the ditch cleanup is known as the Spanish: limpieza y saca de acequia. The ditch-association members are traditionally known as Spanish: parciantes, indicating their stake or portion of the acequia association's labor resources. Sometimes in English the members are called 'irrigationists'. While the flow in the ditch is regulated, water has "never ceased to flow" each year.

According to the Historic American Engineering Record, the Acequia Madre is "probably the oldest Spanish acequia system remaining in the Southwest and can easily be traced today."

== Route ==
The Acequia Madre originates near the location of the Los Cerros Reservoir in the southeastern area of Santa Fe, and extends west for several miles. It flows parallel to Acequia Madre Road, along the south side of the road, through the Camino del Monte Sol Historic District.

== Description ==
The Acequia Madre continues to flow annually through a ditch that is partially stone lined, and approximately one to two feet deep. Its width ranges from approximately two feet to five feet wide. Mature cottonwood trees grow along the ditch, mainly between the ditch and the adobe walls and coyote fences of various properties. Several historical houses are adjacent to the ditch, some of those along the south side still use acequia water to irrigate orchards, alfalfa and other grain fields, and vegetable gardens. These plantings are watered by smaller ditches perpendicular to the Mother Ditch. It was a Spanish custom to deed land in long and narrow strips, so that each property had equal access to the acequia water. There was a historical mill at the intersection of Acequia Madre Road and Abeyta Street, where the Acequia del Ranchos (shown on the King Map) intersected with the Acequia Madre.

=== The Acequia Madre House ===
A historical Territorial Revival-style house known as the Acequia Madre House was built in 1926 by the American artist Eva Scott Féynes along with her daughter and granddaughter. These three women "who would not be constrained by societal codes" devoted their lives to cultural conservation, including the study of Northern New Mexico ethnobotany, Native American songs and languages, Southwestern architecture and folk art. The house is now the headquarters for Women's International Study Center.

== Documentation ==
The Library of Congress holds an archive of photographic prints of the acequia.

== See also ==
- Zanja Madre (Los Angeles)
