= Leonora Scott Curtin =

American botanist and philanthropist

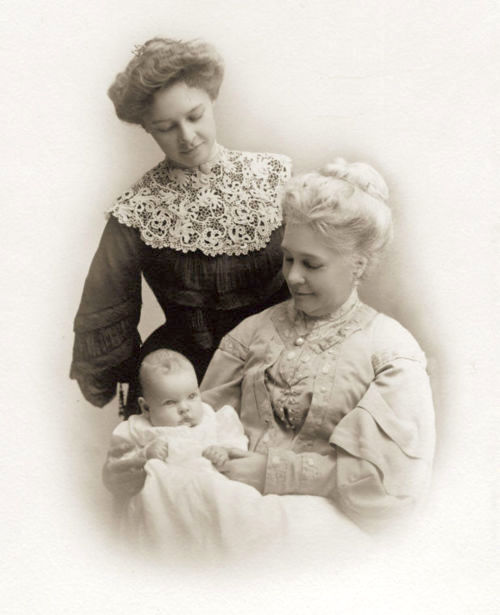
Leonora Scott Curtin (standing) with her mother Eva Scott Fényes and daughter Leonora Frances Curtin, 1903. Photo in the collections at Acequia Madre House, Santa Fe.

Leonora Scott Curtin (née Muse; 1879-1972) was an American botanist, philanthropist, and art collector. Her archives and collections are kept at the Acequia Madre House in Santa Fe and the Pasadena Museum of History in Pasadena.

== Biography ==
Leonora Scott Muse was born in White Plains, New York, on October 2, 1879, as daughter of Eva Scott Muse (later Fényes) and William S. Muse. Her mother moved to Santa Fe, New Mexico, with her in 1889, seeking divorce from her husband. They built a house on Hillside Avenue. Between 1891 and 1896, Leonora went to private schools in England, France, and Switzerland. In 1896 her mother marries her second husband, Hungarian entomologist Adalbert Fényes, and the family moves to Pasadena, California, where Leonora attends Miss Orton's Classical School.

In 1900, Leonora met her future husband, Thomas Edward. Curtin, a lawyer from New York, and the couple marries in 1903. That same year, their daughter and only child Leonora Frances Curtin is born in Colorado Springs, Colorado. After the death of her husband in 1911, she moved to Pasadena and later to Santa Fe. In 1914, she helped found and becomes first president of the Santa Fe Garden Club. In 1925 she becomes a founding member of the Spanish Colonial Arts Society.

Under Edgar Hewett's directorship of the Museum of New Mexico, Leonora Curtin was named a member of its Board of Regents and it's Women's Board. She was later appointed to the executive board of the School of American Research (now School for Advanced Research) in Santa Fe and became a member of the Board of Directors of the Southwest Museum in Los Angeles and of the Old Santa Fe Association and the Historic Santa Fe Foundation. In 1933, she acquired the founding core of what is today El Rancho de las Golondrinas and the Leonora Curtin Wetlands.

She traveled the world, partly with her mother and daughter, and executed research in botany, linguistics, and music, that resulted in several books and articles. "Healing Herbs of the Upper Rio Grande" has become a classic and has been reprinted several times. Documents pertaining to her research on Arabic words in the Spanish language (in collaboration with John Peabody Harrington) are kept in the Smithsonian Institution Archives.

After several years of fieldwork in Arizona, she published her second book "By the Prophet of the Earth" in 1949. Several manuscripts remain unpublished, like the results of her botanical studies in Michoacán, Mexico.

Curtin assembled a large collections of Southwestern fetish carvings and donated more than 160 of them to the Wheelwright Museum. In addition she collected contemporary Native American pottery and paintings from the Southwest. A special focus of the paintings is on depictions of koshares. Because of that special interest, Pʼohwhogeh Ówîngeh artist Julian Martinez gave her the nickname "kosharita", as is documented by Leonora on the backside of one of three paintings she acquired from Julian.

== Death and legacy ==
She died on September 2, 1972, aged 92, in Santa Fe.

Her archives and collections are kept at the Acequia Madre House in Santa Fe and the Pasadena Museum of History in Pasadena.
