= Acequia Madre House =

Historical building in Santa Fe, New Mexico

- 614 Acequia Madre
- U.S. Historic district – Contributing property
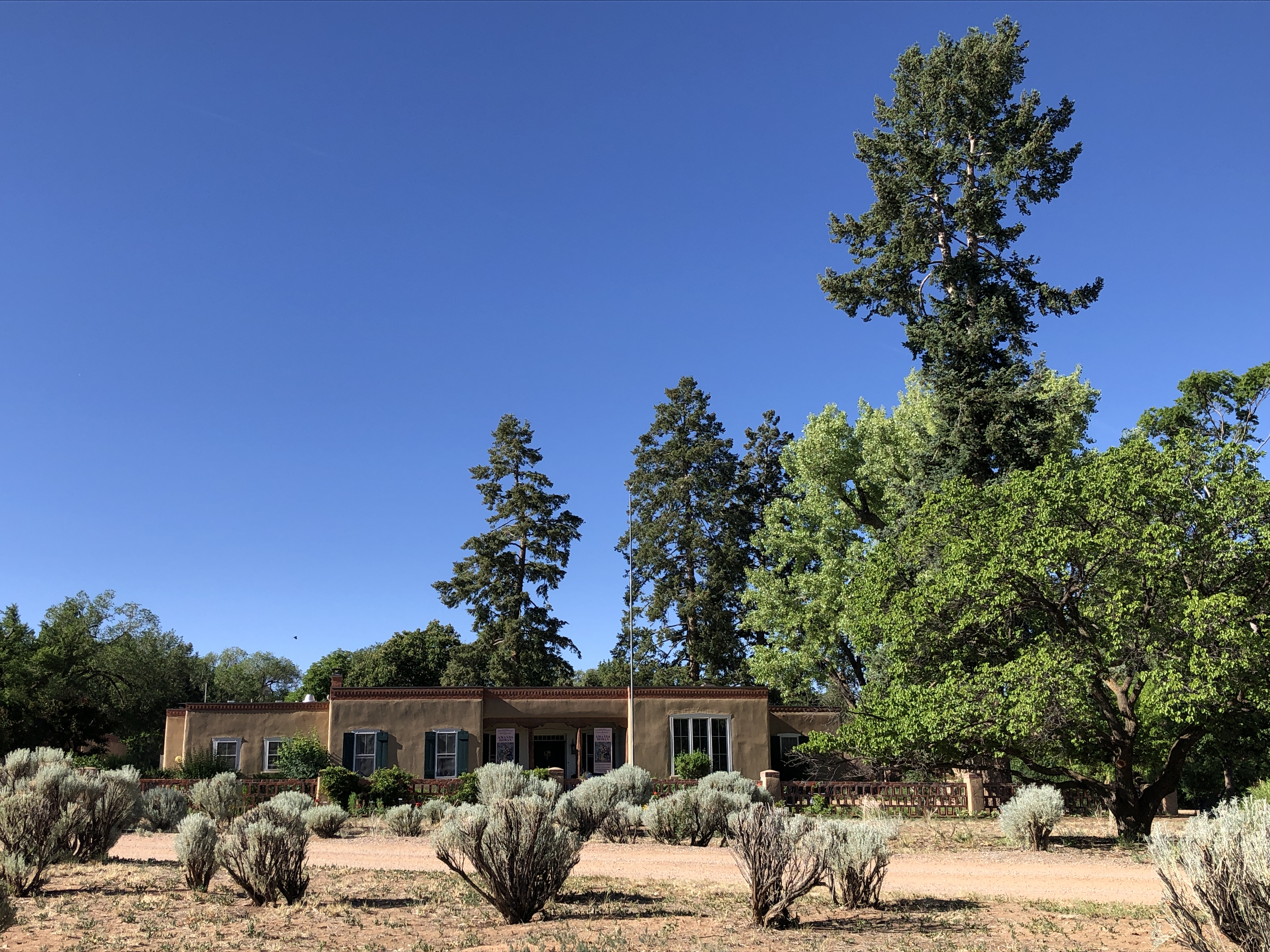
- Acequia Madre House and gardens as seen from Acequia Madre

- Location within New Mexico
- Location: 614 Acequia Madre, Santa Fe, New Mexico
- Coordinates: 35°40′45″N 105°55′52″W
- Architectural style: Territorial Revival
- Part of: Camino del Monte Sol Historic District (ID88000440)
- Designated CP: July 11, 1988

Acequia Madre House is a house built at 614 Acequia Madre in Santa Fe, in the U.S. state of New Mexico, in 1926 in the Territorial Revival style.

Built by Eva Scott Fényes (1849–1930), her daughter Leonora Scott Muse Curtin (1879–1972), and her granddaughter Leonora Frances Curtin Paloheimo (1903–1999), it today houses their legacy in the form of vast collections, spanning more than 150 years of family history, including about 4,000 objects, 12,000 photographs, 700 boxes of archival material, and a historic library of 5,000 books. The property was bought in 1922.

It was listed on the National Register of Historic Places in 1988 as one of 106 contributing buildings in the Camino del Monte Sol Historic District.

== Collections ==
The object collections consist of several hundred paintings and prints. Eva Scott Fényes, as well as her granddaughter Leonora Frances Curtin Paloheimo, were watercolor artists. Eva collected self-portraits by artists and organized them into two albums. She kept close friendships with many artists from New Mexico and California, where she had her second home in Pasadena. Works by Awa Tsireh, Julian Martinez, Muhammad Ben Ali Ribati, Sheldon Orin Parsons, Gerald Cassidy, Gustave Baumann, Benjamin Brown, Howell Chambers Brown, and many others can be found here.

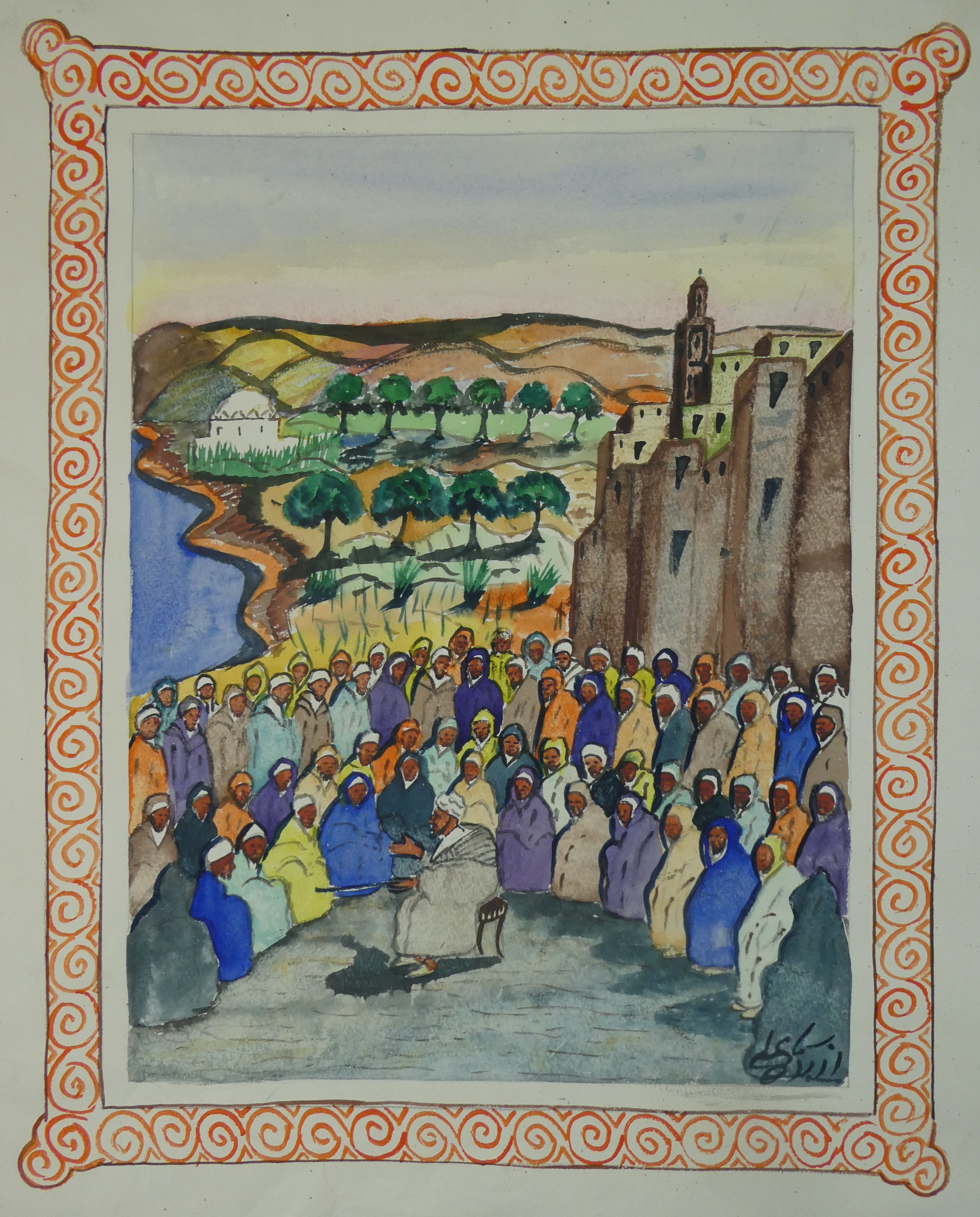
The Story Teller, Muhammad Ben Ali Ribati

The extensive and worldwide pottery collection contains works by Maria Martinez, Margaret Tafoya, Arabia, and sculptor Frank Applegate.

Another focus lies on traditional arts and crafts from New Mexico. To support local traditions, the family helped found the Spanish Colonial Arts Society in 1925 and Leonora Frances Curtin Paloheimo founded the Native Market on West Palace Avenue in Santa Fe, with branches in Tucson and New York, in 1934.

Extensive collections from their travels around the world were partly used to inspire local New Mexican arts and crafts. The Native Market archive is kept as part of the archives at Acequia Madre House.

The collections also reflect the existing networks within Santa Fe and are the result of exchange between artists, collectors, and institutions. Several objects were bought from or exchanged with the Museum of New Mexico, Margretta Dietrich, Dorothy Dunn, Olive Rush, and several others.

More than 6,000 photographs are available online in the New Mexican Digital Collections of the University of New Mexico.

Acequia Madre House is also home of the Women's International Study Center, founded in 2013. Participants in the fellowship program are encouraged to explore the collections and use them for research. Collections and archives are open by appointment.

The building and collections are owned by El Rancho de las Golondrinas.

== Garden ==
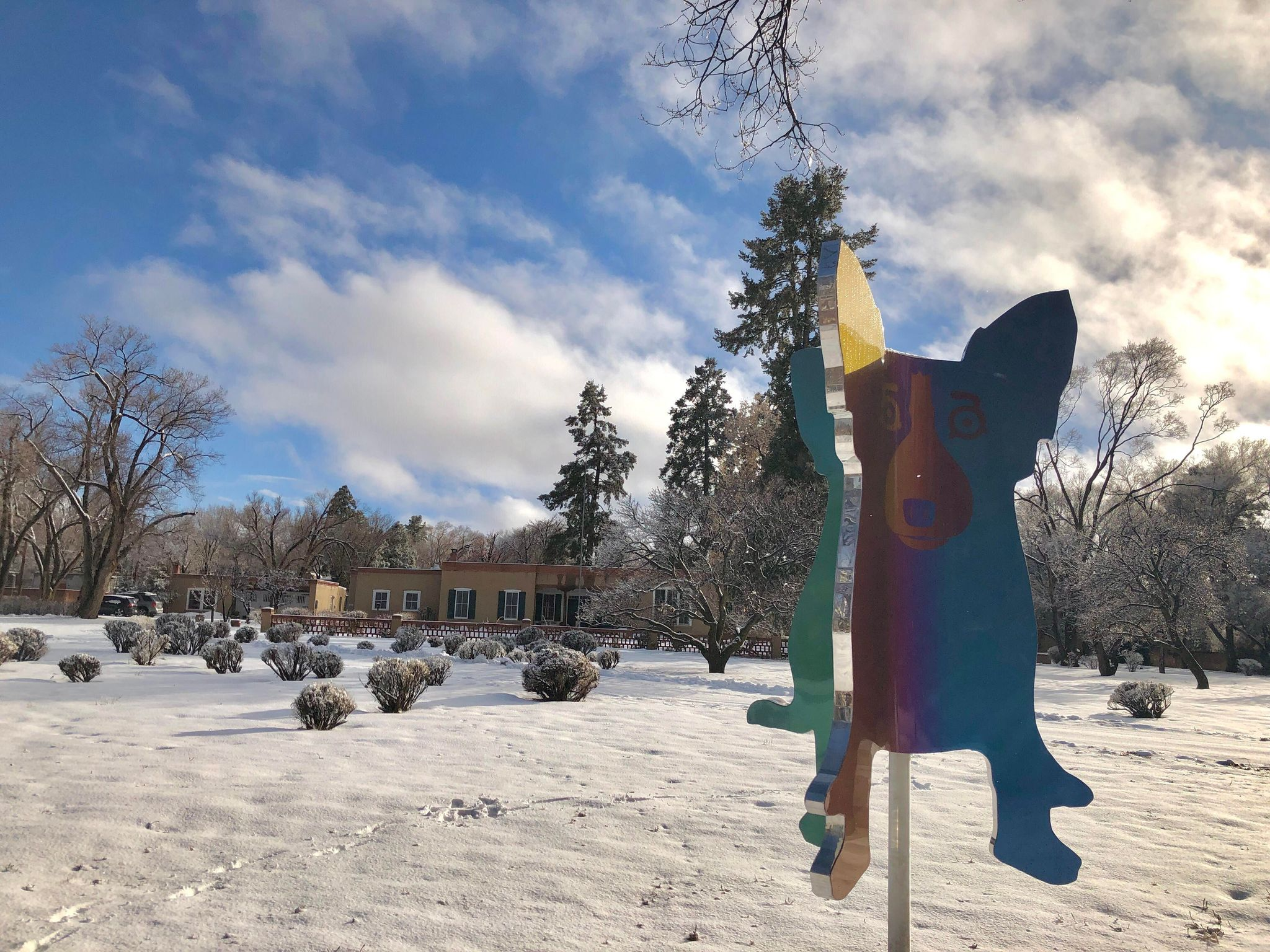
Colors of My Mind by George Rodrigue, 2008, in the garden of Acequia Madre House.

The 3-acre (1.2 ha) garden at Acequia Madre House consists of a landscape garden with fruit trees, an herb garden and lawn opposite the main entrance to the house, and a flower garden on one side of the house. In 2022, a metal sculpture by George Rodrigue was added to the landscape garden. Colors of My Mind dates from 2008 and shows Rodrigue's iconic blue dog.

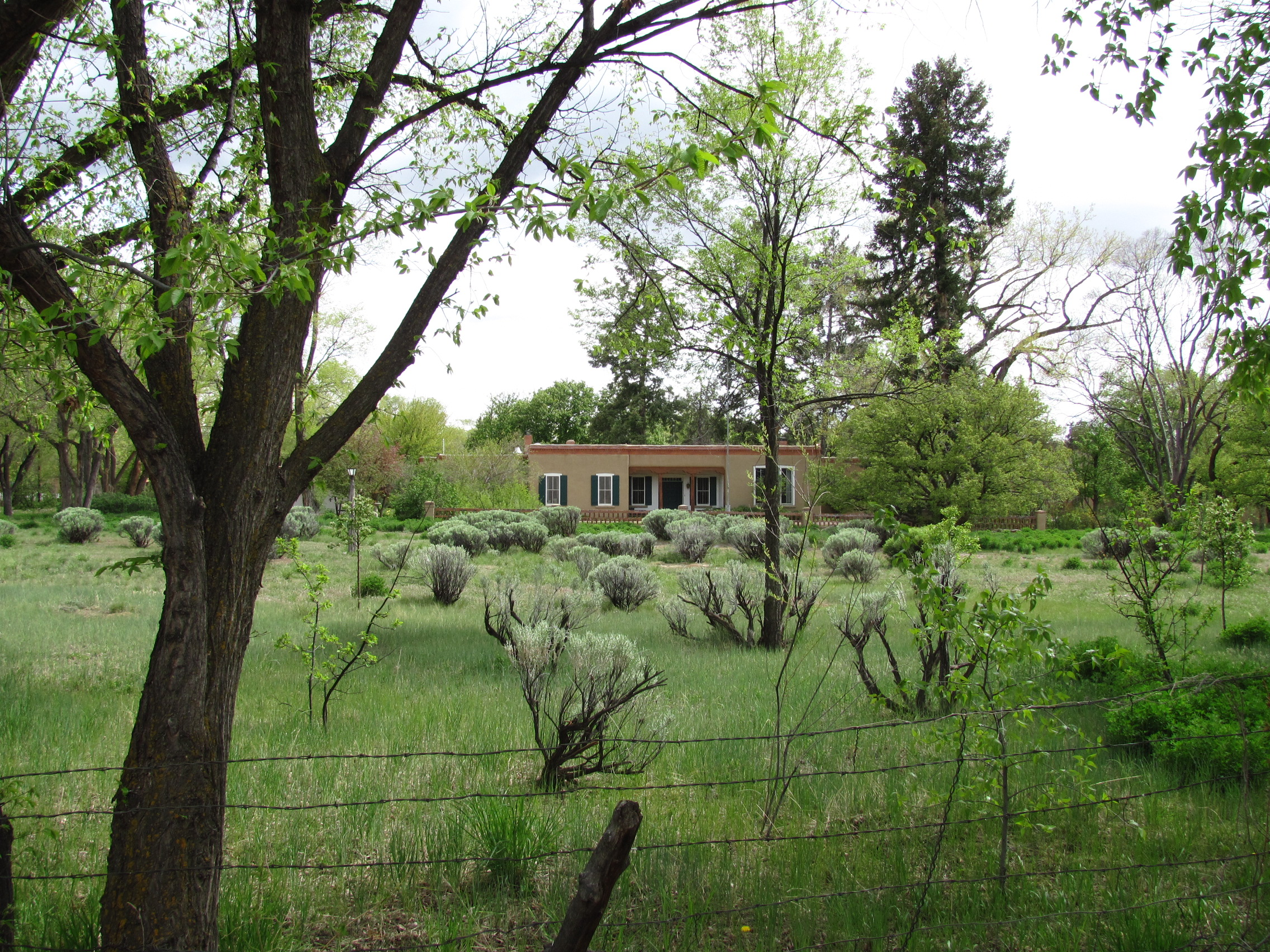
Acequia Madre House

== See also ==
- National Register of Historic Places listings in Santa Fe County, New Mexico
- Gustave Baumann House
