= Adalbert Fenyes =

Hungarian-born American physician

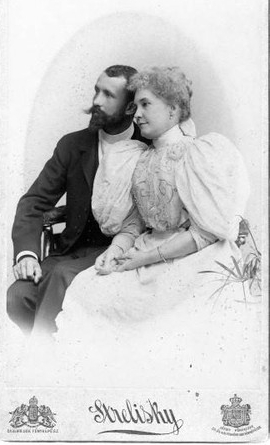
Adalbert and Eva Fenyes in 1896

Adalbert Fényes (17 November 1863 – 22 February 1937) was a Hungarian-born American physician who introduced the X-ray machine to Pasadena, California. In his spare time, he was a keen collector of insect specimens and took an interest in gardening and breeding of new flower varieties.

Fenyes was born in Arad where his father Carolus was an attorney from a lineage of nobility. He was educated at the University of Vienna and trained in neurology before becoming an army physician in the court of Franz Joseph. He served in Helwan, Egypt in 1893, and married a New York millionaire artist Eva Scott in 1896. He moved to the US and introduced the first X-ray machine in Pasadena. He was made an honorary member of the American Medical Society for his pioneering work in this field. In his spare time, he took an interest in insects and began to make a large collection. After 1905, he became especially interested in the staphylinid subfamily Aleocharinae and attempted to use aleocharine beetles for control of pests in citrus orchards. He also took an interest in horticulture and imported carnation varieties from England.

After the death of Eva Scott in 1930, Fenyes married Louise Hiller. The Fenyes Mansion has been declared a heritage landmark by the state of California. His collection of insects was sold by his second wife to the California Academy of Sciences.
