= Los Angeles Harbor Region =

Region of Los Angeles County, California, United States

Coordinates: 33.81°N 118.21°W

The Los Angeles Harbor Region, sometimes truncated to simply The Harbor, takes up a large portion of southern Los Angeles County, California. The area is impacted by the harbor complex consisting of the Port of Los Angeles and the Port of Long Beach.

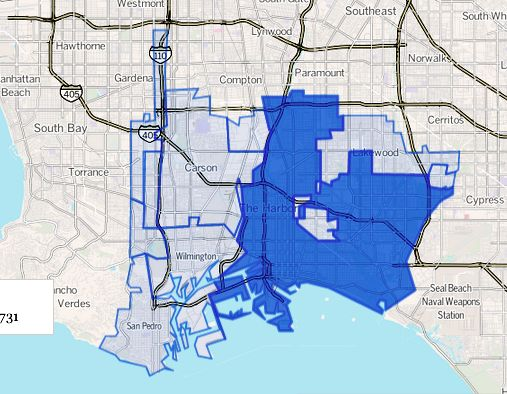
Los Angeles Harbor Region as drawn by the Los Angeles Times. Dark blue is the city of Long Beach.

== Geography ==
=== City of Los Angeles ===
The city of Los Angeles' official Harbor Area Planning Commission area encompasses the following community plan areas (CPAs):

- Port of Los Angeles CPA
- Harbor Gateway CPA
- San Pedro CPA
- Wilmington–Harbor City CPA

=== Mapping L.A. ===
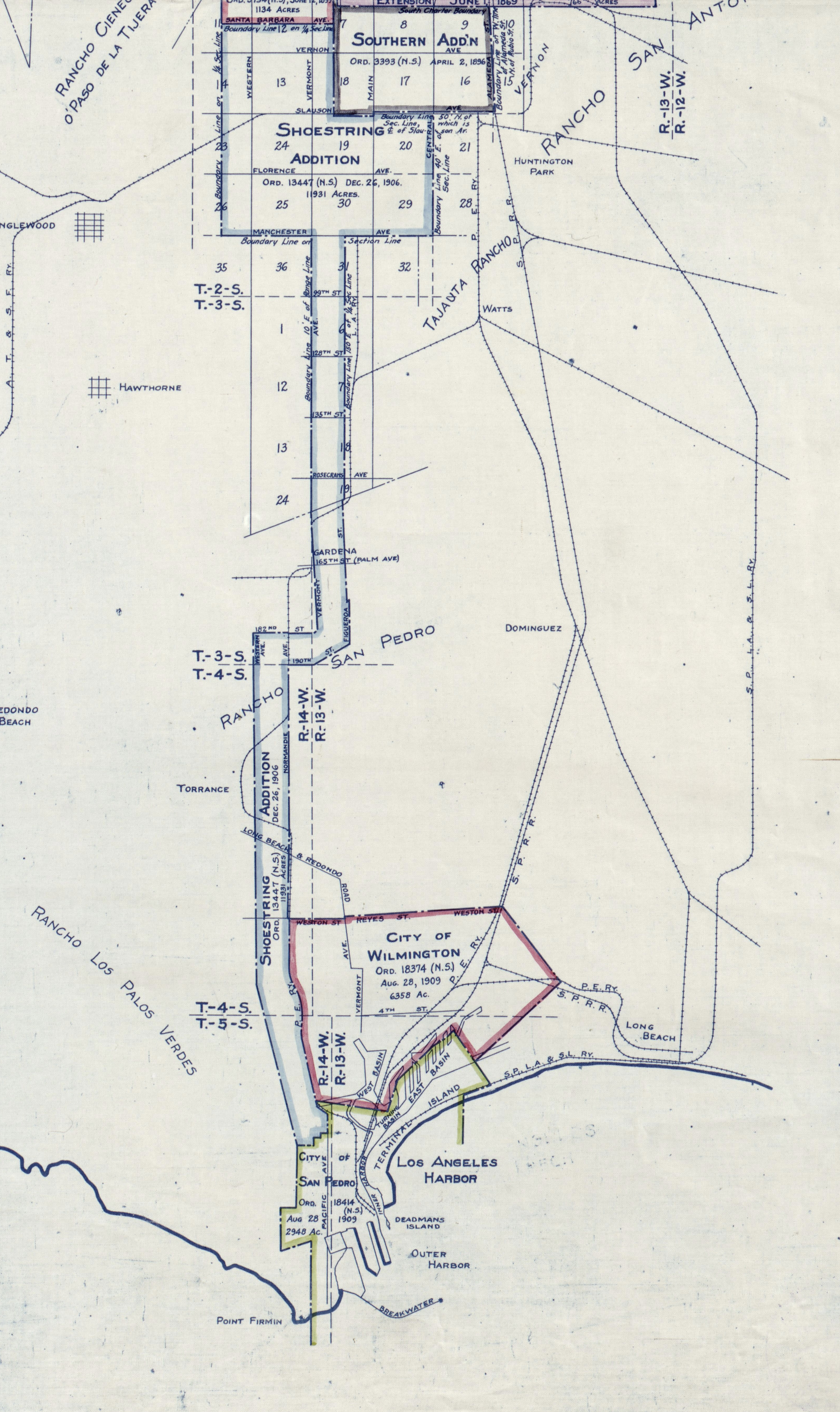
Harbor area, Los Angeles: Shoestring Annexation (Dec. 26, 1906) San Pedro Annexation (Aug. 28, 1909), Wilmington Annexation (Aug. 28, 1909)

As defined by Mapping L.A. of the Los Angeles Times, the region, which includes the city of Los Angeles as well as other cities and unincorporated areas of Los Angeles County, is a 193.09-square-mile area flanked by South Los Angeles or Los Angeles County's Southeast Region on the north, Orange County on the east, the Pacific Ocean on the south, and the South Bay region on the west.

Cities and neighborhoods within the Harbor Region are:

- Avalon
- Carson
- Catalina Island
- Harbor City, Los Angeles
- Harbor Gateway, Los Angeles
- Hawaiian Gardens
- Lakewood
- Long Beach
  - Neighborhoods of Long Beach, California
- Rancho Dominguez
- Signal Hill
- San Pedro, Los Angeles
- Two Harbors
- West Carson
- Wilmington, Los Angeles

== Demographics ==
In 2000 the region was composed of Latinos, 39.4%; whites, 30.7%; Asians, 13.2%, Blacks, 13%, and others, 3.6%. West Carson was the most ethnically diverse neighborhood within the region, and Wilmington was the least diverse.

The wealthiest neighborhood was Lakewood, and the poorest was Wilmington.

Twenty-one percent of all residents aged 25 and older had a four-year degree. Signal Hill had the most post-secondary graduates and Wilmington the fewest.

Rancho Dominguez was the neighborhood with the oldest population, while Hawaiian Gardens was the youngest.

Renters made up 51.7% of the population. The neighborhood with the highest rental rate was unincorporated Santa Catalina Island, while the one with the most homeowners was Rancho Dominguez.

== See also ==
- Port of Long Beach
- Port of Los Angeles
