= Angels Attic =

Toy museum in Santa Monica, California, United States (1984–2017)

- Established: 1984
- Dissolved: April 2017
- Location: Santa Monica, California
- Coordinates: 34.0147°N 118.4907°W
- Founders: Jackie McMahan, Eleanor LaVove

Angels Attic was a museum of dollhouses, toys, and miniatures located in Santa Monica, California.

The museum was established in 1984 by Jackie McMahan, a longtime collector, and Eleanor LaVove, a former fashion editor. McMahan and LaVove had begun a backyard dollhouse exhibition in 1974 to raise funds for a special education school attended by McMahan's granddaughter. The annual exhibitions later moved to the Santa Monica Civic Auditorium and drew thousands of visitors. In 1981 they bought a rundown Queen Anne style house in downtown Santa Monica, which had been built in 1895, moved to its present location in 1924, later subdivided into apartments, and allowed to deteriorate. They spent almost a year restoring the house, and opened the museum in 1984.

The museum closed permanently in April 2017.
