= Eva Scott Fényes =

American artist

- Born: Eva Scott; November 9, 1849; New York City
- Died: February 3, 1930 (aged 80); Pasadena, California
- Known for: Watercolor

Eva Scott Fényes (formerly Muse; November 9, 1849 – February 3, 1930) was an American painter known for watercolor landscape of the American West. She was also known for her philanthropic activities.

== Biography ==
Eva Scott was born on November 9, 1849, in New York City as the only child of Leonard and Rebecca (Briggs) Scott. She attended Pelham Priory School, the first girls’ preparatory school in the New York area, where she received her first art training. Around 1868 or 1869 she traveled through Southern Europe and Northern Africa with her parents and spent six weeks in Egypt, where she received art training from Sanford R. Gifford.

On November 19, 1878, she married Lieutenant William S. Muse, US Marine Corps, Fort Monroe, Virginia, with whom she had one child, Leonora Scott Muse Curtin (1879–1972). In 1889, Eva and her daughter came to Santa Fe, New Mexico. Eva filed for divorce from William Muse in the district court of Santa Fe County in June 1890.

In 1895, she traveled to Egypt again, where she met her second husband, Hungarian nobleman Adalbert Fényes de Csokaly. They married in Budapest in 1896 and returned to the United States.

Fényes and her husband settled in Pasadena, California. She commissioned Robert D. Farquhar to design a house, known as the Fenyes Mansion, and now the home of the Pasadena Museum of History. Fényes was a member of the Landmarks Club of California, the Pasadena Music and Art Association, and the Southwest Society. She also served on the board of trustees of the Southwest Museum.

Though never a professional artist, Fényes was an accomplished watercolorist. With the urging of Charles Fletcher Lummis she created over 300 landscapes which often included Southwest architecture features such as missions and adobe structures.

In 1926, Fényes, her daughter, and granddaughter built a home in Santa Fe, Acequia Madre House. The house was established as a nonprofit organization with support by the Paloheimo Foundation. Museum director and historian J. Revell Carr was hired to develop a strategic plan, and in July 2012 the house and outbuildings on three acres were designated a museum by the Santa Fe Board of Adjustment. In 2013 the house also became home to the Women's International Study Center.

== Death ==
Fényes died on February 3, 1930, aged 80, in Pasadena, California. Her watercolors and sketchbooks are in the collections of the Autry Museum of the American West in Los Angeles, the Pasadena Museum of History and the Acequia Madre House in Santa Fe.

== Gallery ==
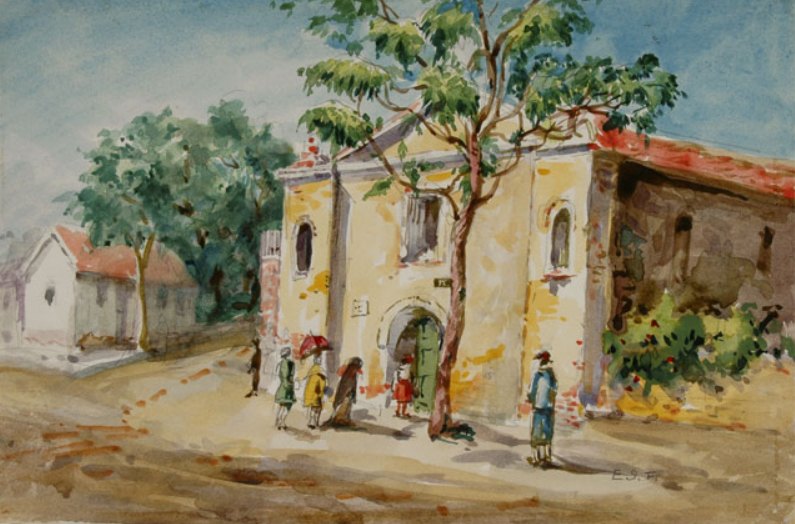
The Mission of San Gabriel Arcangel, circa 1900

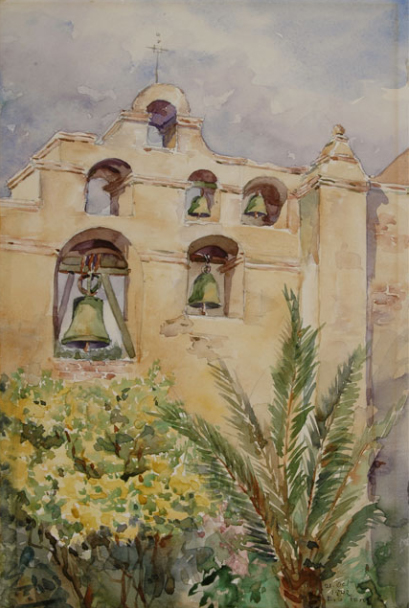
The Belfry and Bells of Mission San Gabriel Arcangel, 1902

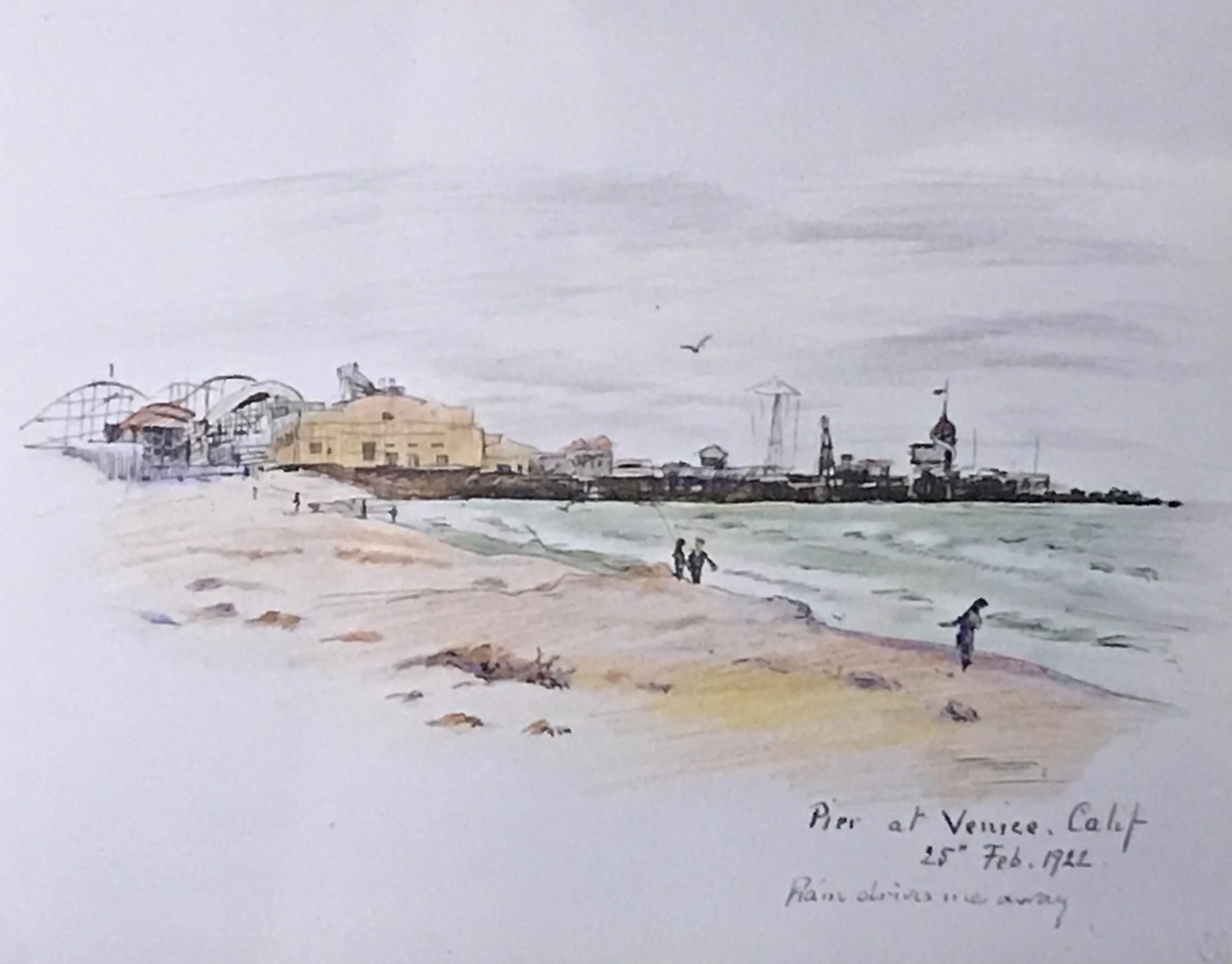
by Eva Scott Fényes
