= Fenyes Estate =

Historic house in California, United States

- U.S. National Register of Historic Places
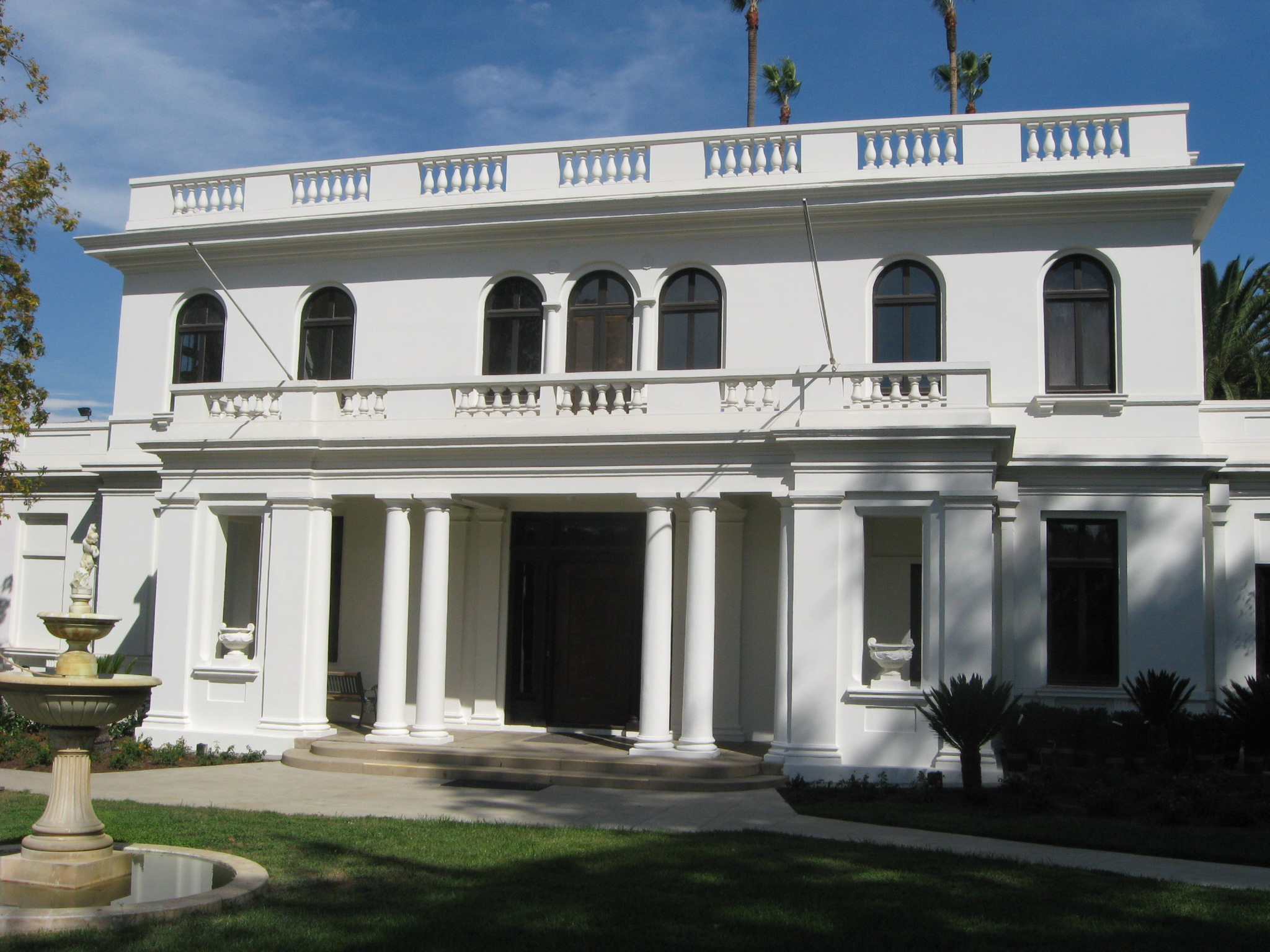
- The Fenyes Mansion

- Location within the Los Angeles metropolitan area Location within California Location within the United States
- Location: 470 W. Walnut St. & 160 N. Orange Grove Blvd., Pasadena, California
- Coordinates: 34°8′56″N 118°9′37″W
- Area: 2.6 acres (1.1 ha)
- Built: 1905, 1910, 1915
- Architect: Marston & Van Pelt; Farquar, Robert
- Architectural style: Italian Villa, French Classical
- NRHP reference No.: 85001983
- Added to NRHP: September 5, 1985

The Fenyes Estate is a historic two-acre estate complex located at 160-170 Orange Grove Boulevard in Pasadena along what was once known as "Millionaires' Row". The Pasadena Museum of History maintains the century-old estate and offers docent-led tours of the Fenyes Mansion, the Curtin House, and the Finnish Folk Art Museum and gardens.

In 1905, Adalbert Fenyes, a Hungarian entomologist and the first Pasadena doctor to use an X-ray machine, and his wife Eva Scott Muse Fenyes commissioned a two-story house from architect Robert D. Farquhar. Designed in the Beaux Arts manner, the mansion was completed at a cost of $20,325, In 1911, architect Sylvanus Marston of Marston & Van Pelt completed an addition consisting of a studio, conservatory, and laboratory.

Like many of the large old homes along Orange Grove Boulevard, the Fenyes Mansion reflects the opulent neoclassical tastes popular at the turn of the century. Fenyes' wife, Eva, was an accomplished artist and world traveler who met her husband in Cairo, Egypt.

The estate and gardens were used as sets for a number of early motion pictures for film industry notables such as Douglas Fairbanks and D. W. Griffith. The estate is listed as a Pasadena Cultural Landmark and was added to the National Register of Historic Places on September 5, 1985.

Marston & Van Pelt also designed the 1915 Curtin House, a smaller French-influenced house on the grounds for Eva Fenyes' only daughter, Leonora Curtin, who inherited the mansion from her mother. Leonora Curtin had one daughter also named Leonora who was known as Babsie. A linguist who spent time among the Pueblo Indians, Babsie traveled widely, spending time in Santa Fe and Pasadena until she met Yrjö Alfred Paloheimo, a Finnish diplomat whom she married in 1946.

Paloheimo was Finland's Consul for the Southwest area and the Fenyes Mansion served as the Finnish consulate's office for seventeen years. Paloheimo also established the Finnish Folk Art Museum, a Swiss chalet-style building. Paloheimo and his wife adopted four Finnish children, who together donated the estate to the Pasadena Museum of History in 1970.

== Gallery ==
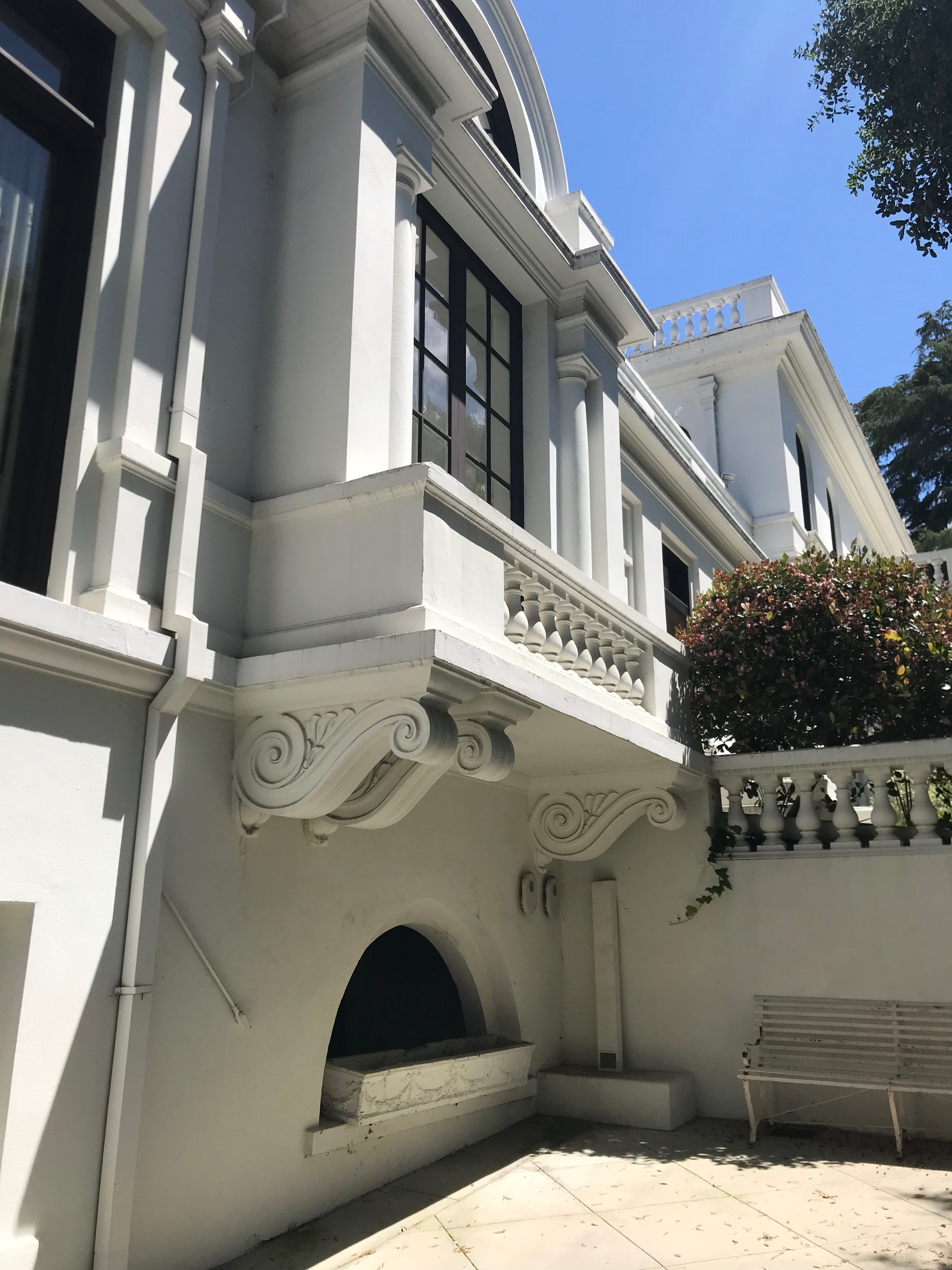
The exterior of the Fenyes mansion.

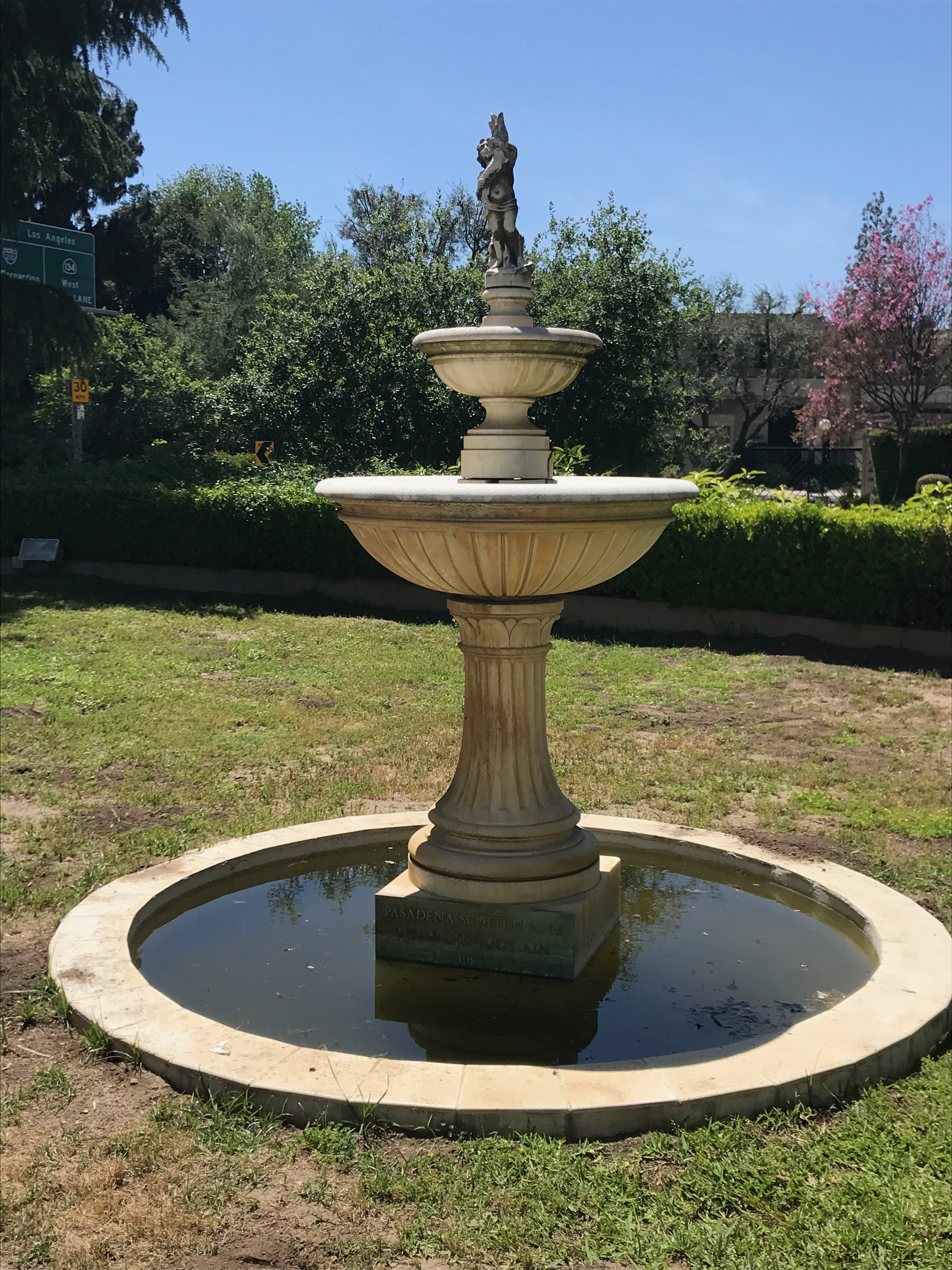
Fenyes Fountain.

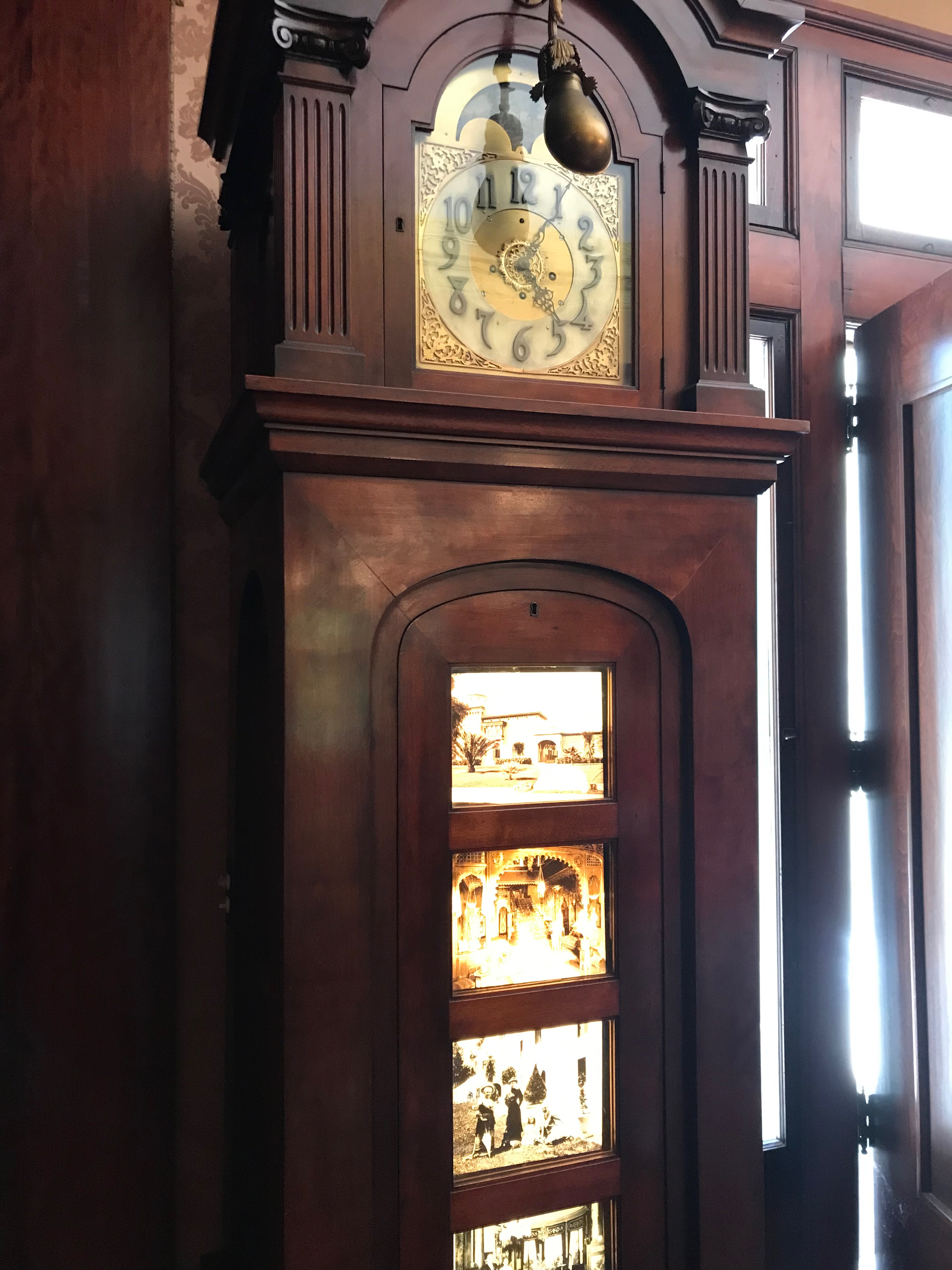
Grandfather clock at the Fenyes Mansion entryway.

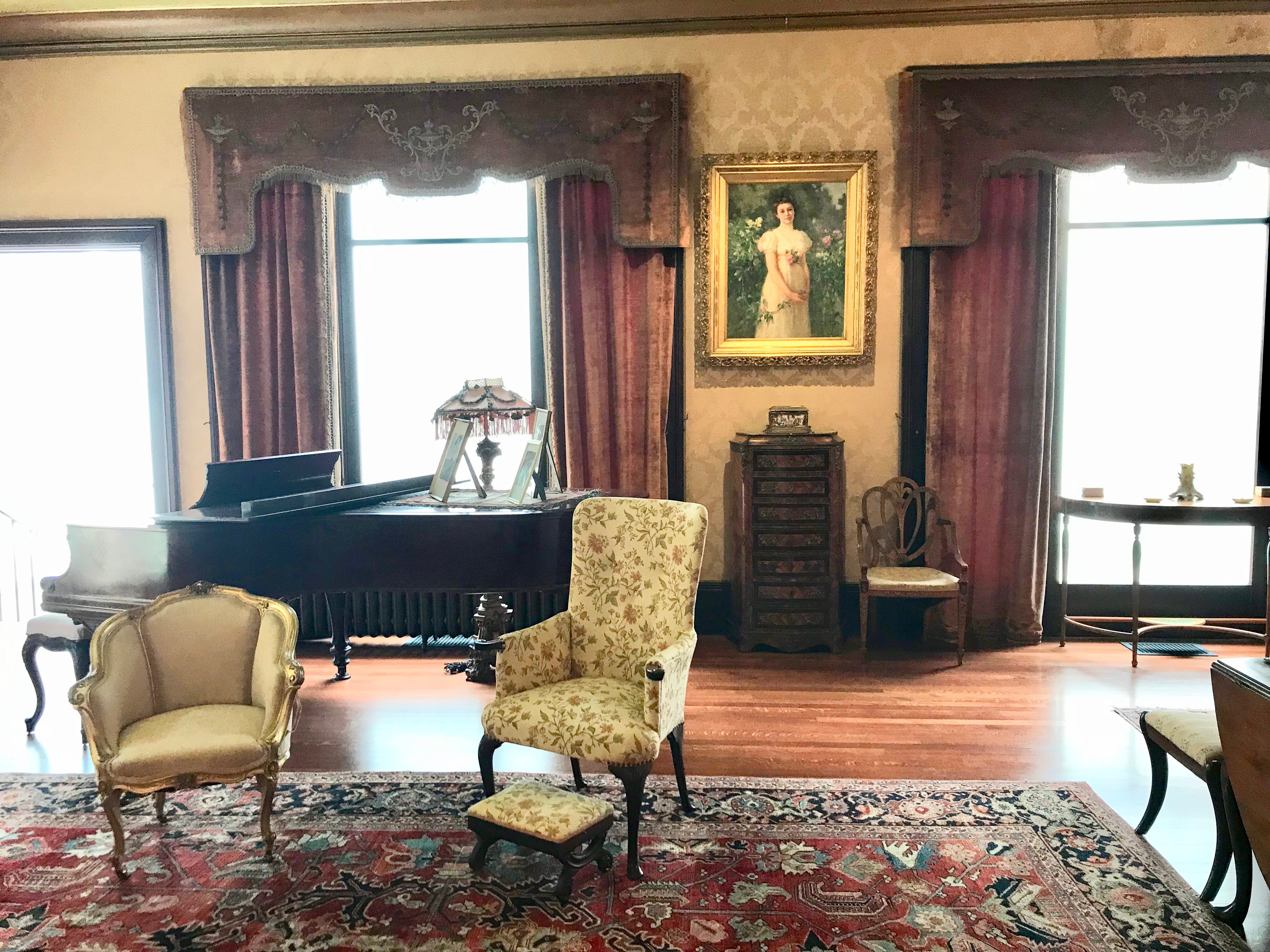
View of the Fenyes parlor.

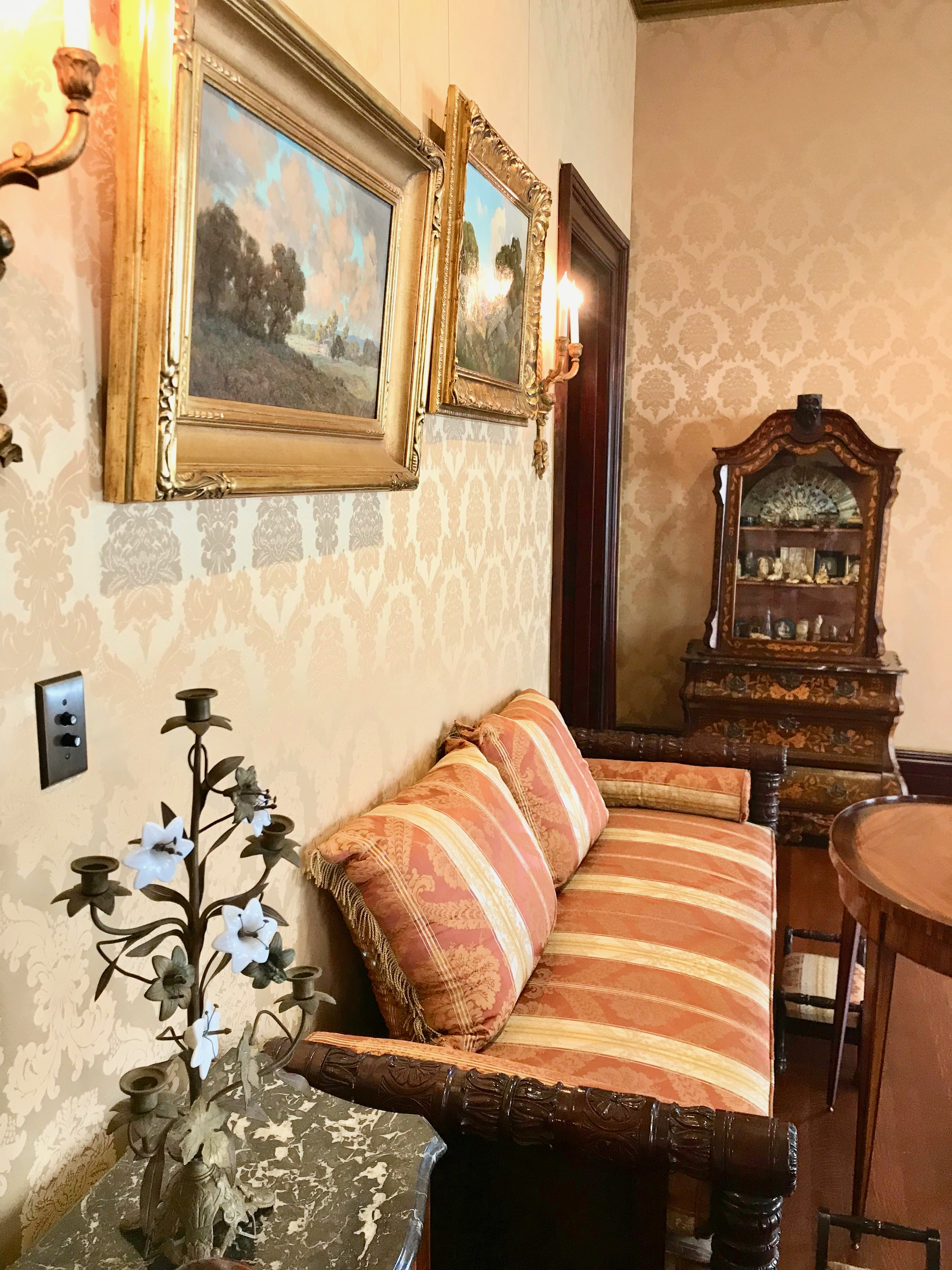
Settee in the Fenyes parlor.

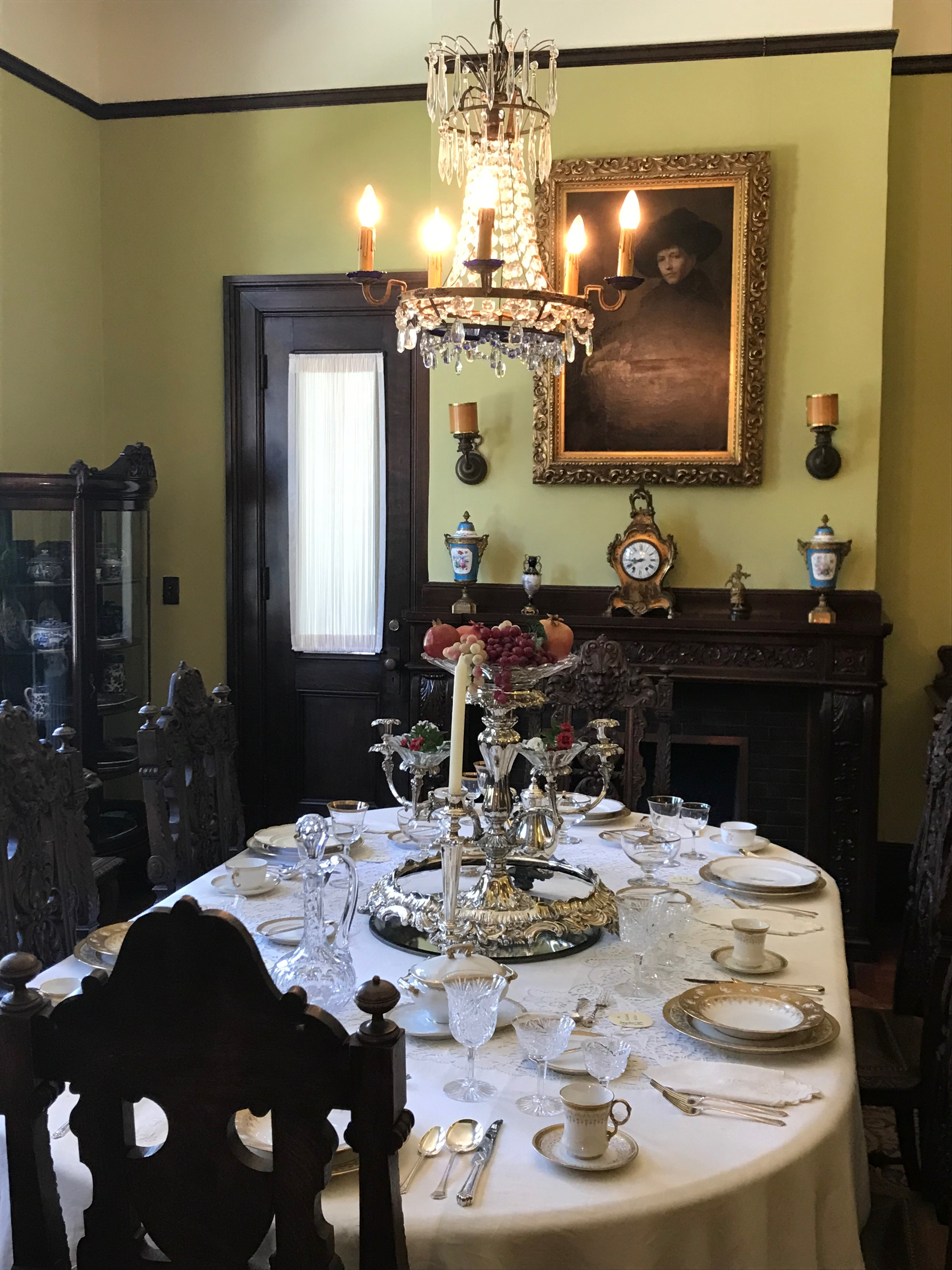
View of the Fenyes dining room.

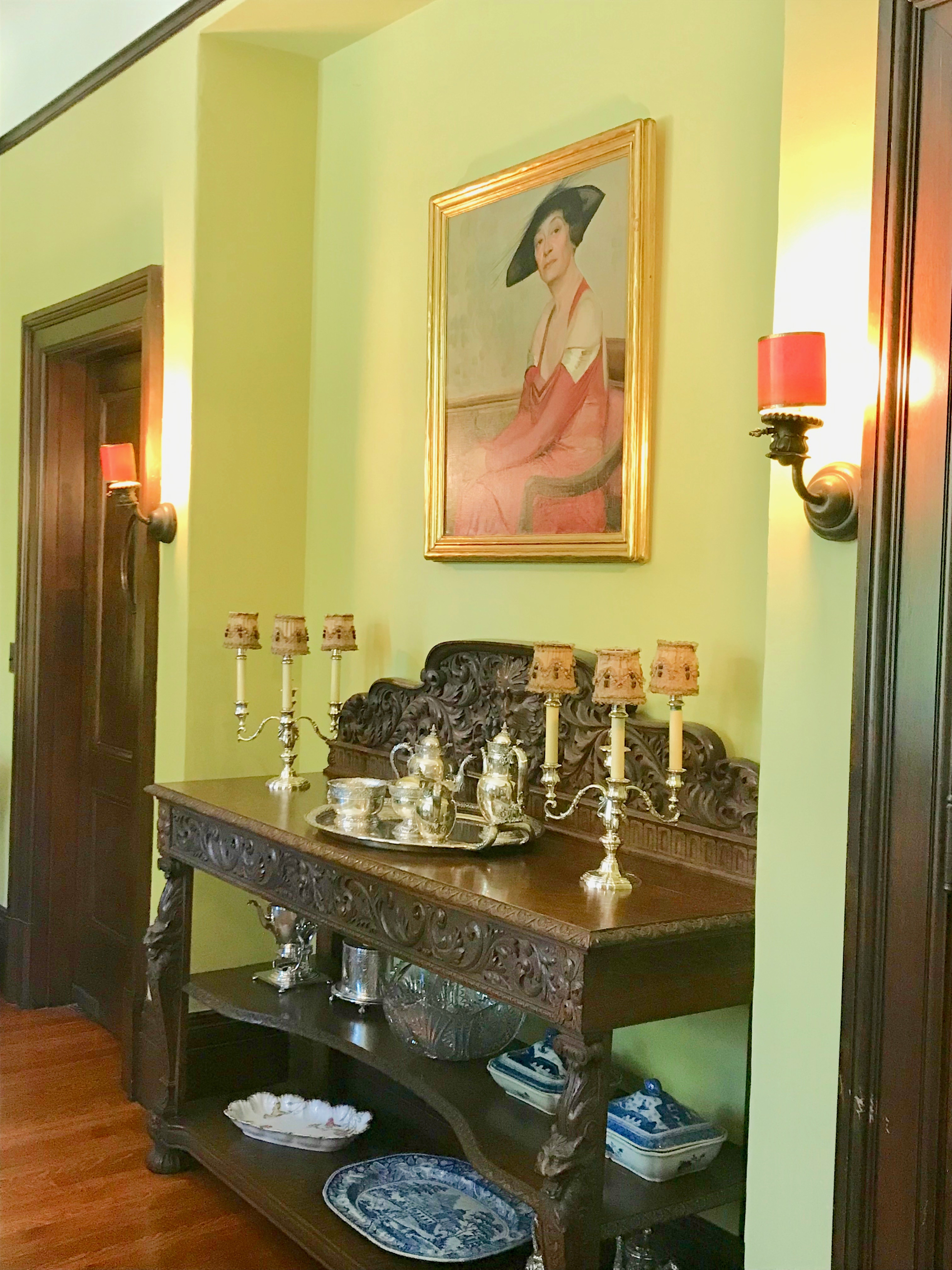
Sideboard in the Fenyes dining room.

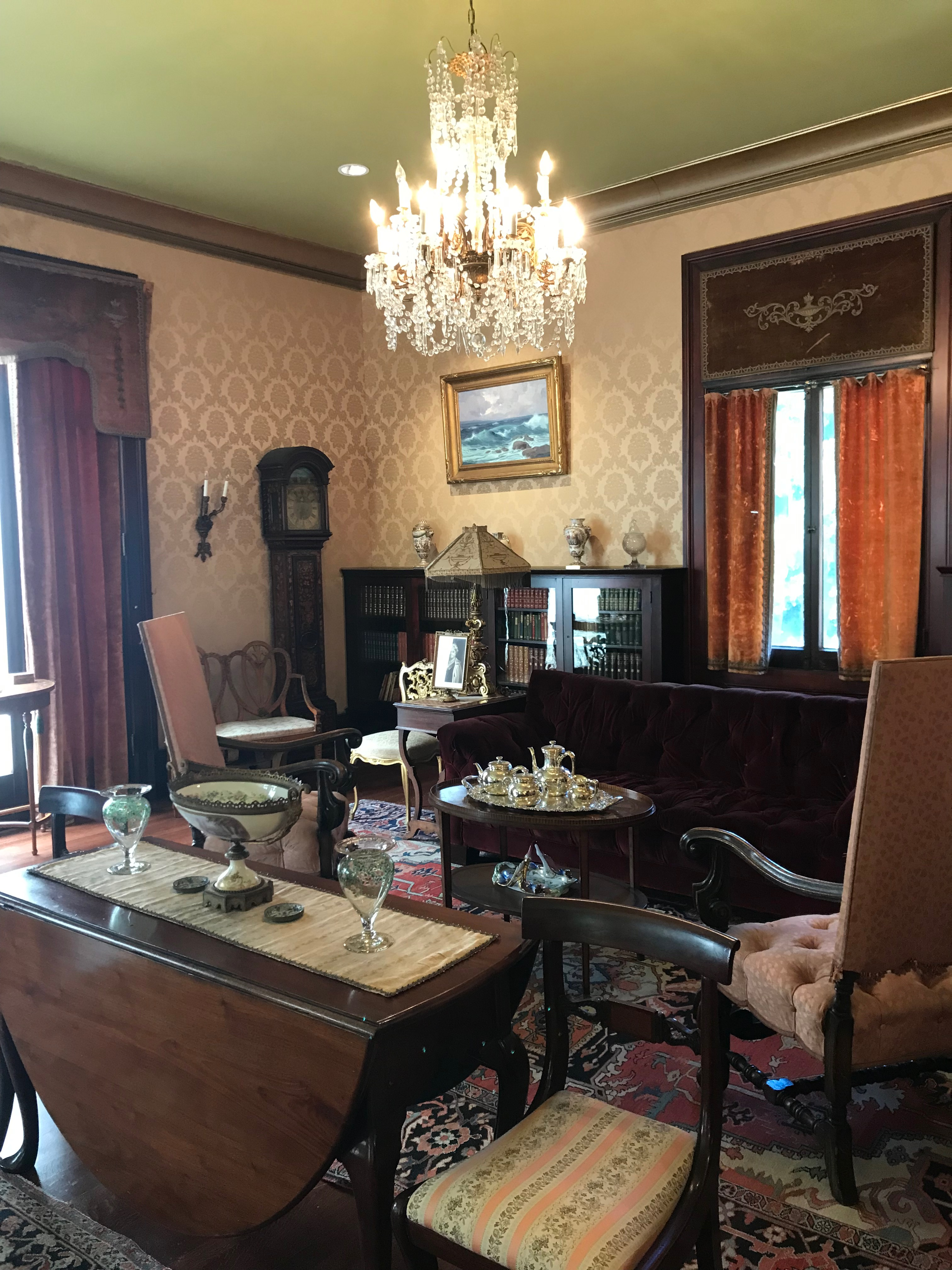
A look at the Fenyes Mansion parlor.

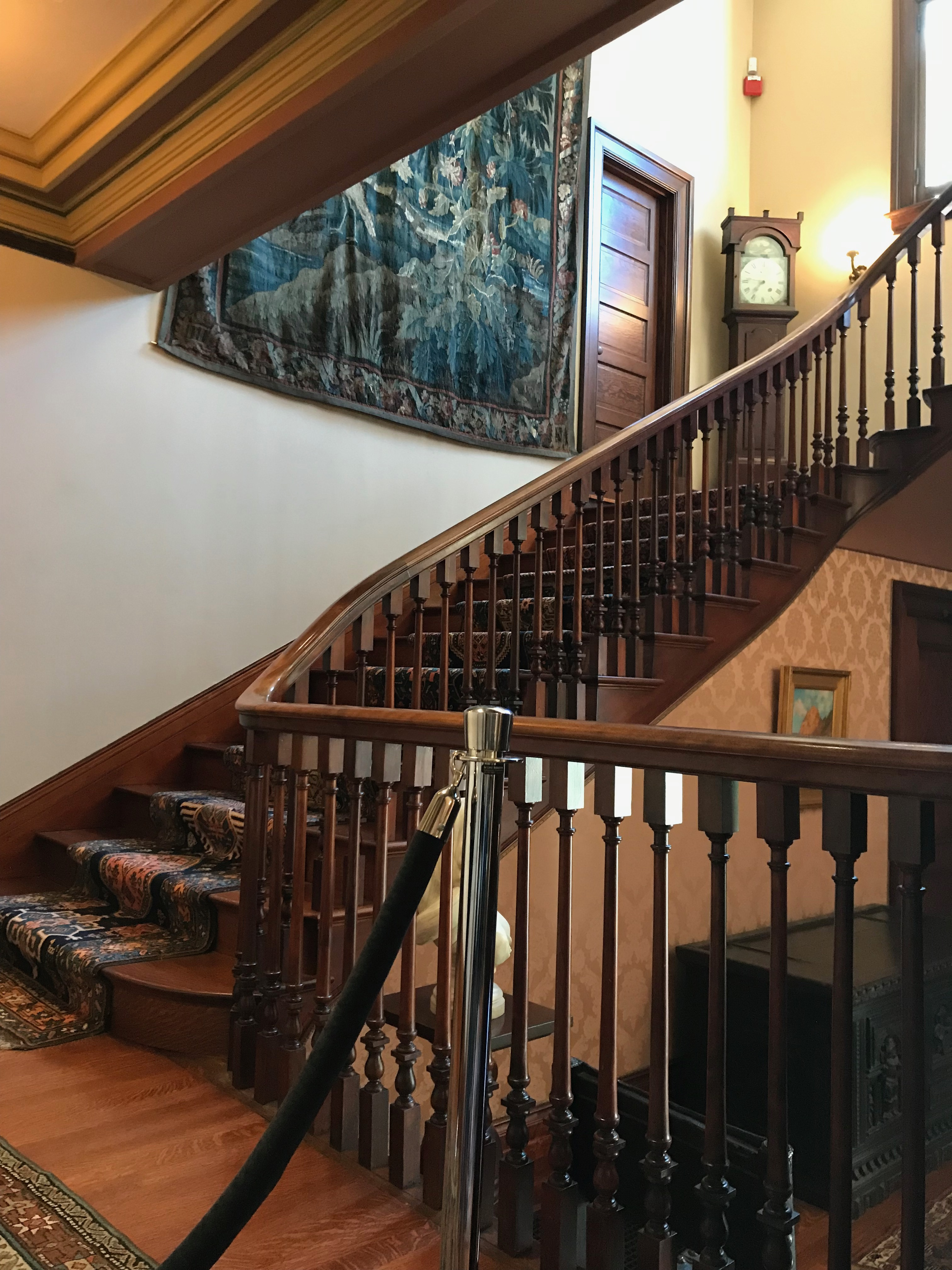
The Fenyes Mansion staircase.
