= Pasadena Museum of History =

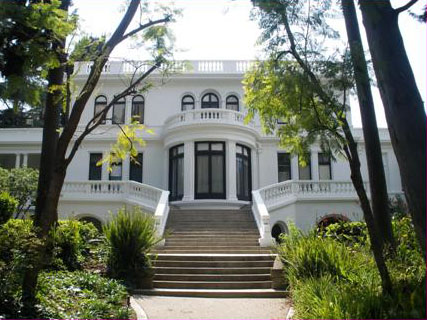
- Fenyes Mansion at Pasadena Museum of History

- Location within the Los Angeles metropolitan area
- Established: 1924; 102 years ago
- Location: Pasadena, California, U.S.
- Coordinates: 34°08′57″N 118°09′40″W
- Type: Library, Museum
- President: William E. Thomson Jr.
- Website: pasadenahistory.org

Pasadena Museum of History is a private, nonprofit museum and research library located in Pasadena, California. It is the only institution dedicated to the history, art and culture of historic Pasadena and the west San Gabriel Valley. Headquartered on the grounds of a century-old Pasadena estate, facilities include the Pasadena Museum History Center, the Fenyes Estate and gardens, a research library and archives, the Curtin House, and the Finnish Folk Art Museum. With public exhibits, tours, lectures, seminars, and workshops, the Pasadena Museum of History promotes an appreciation of history, culture, arts and sciences relevant to Pasadena and adjoining communities.

== History ==
The City of Pasadena was founded in 1874, when members of the Indiana Colony settled along the banks of the Arroyo Seco. In 1924, the Pasadena Historical Society began to collect information about the area's history, with one filing cabinet of material collected by volunteers. In 1932, the historical society was given a room at the Pasadena Civic Auditorium. In 1958, the collection moved to the Pasadena Public Library where it was maintained by volunteers. In 1970, thanks to a gift from the Paloheimo family, the museum moved to its present location on the grounds on the historic two-acre Fenyes Estate.

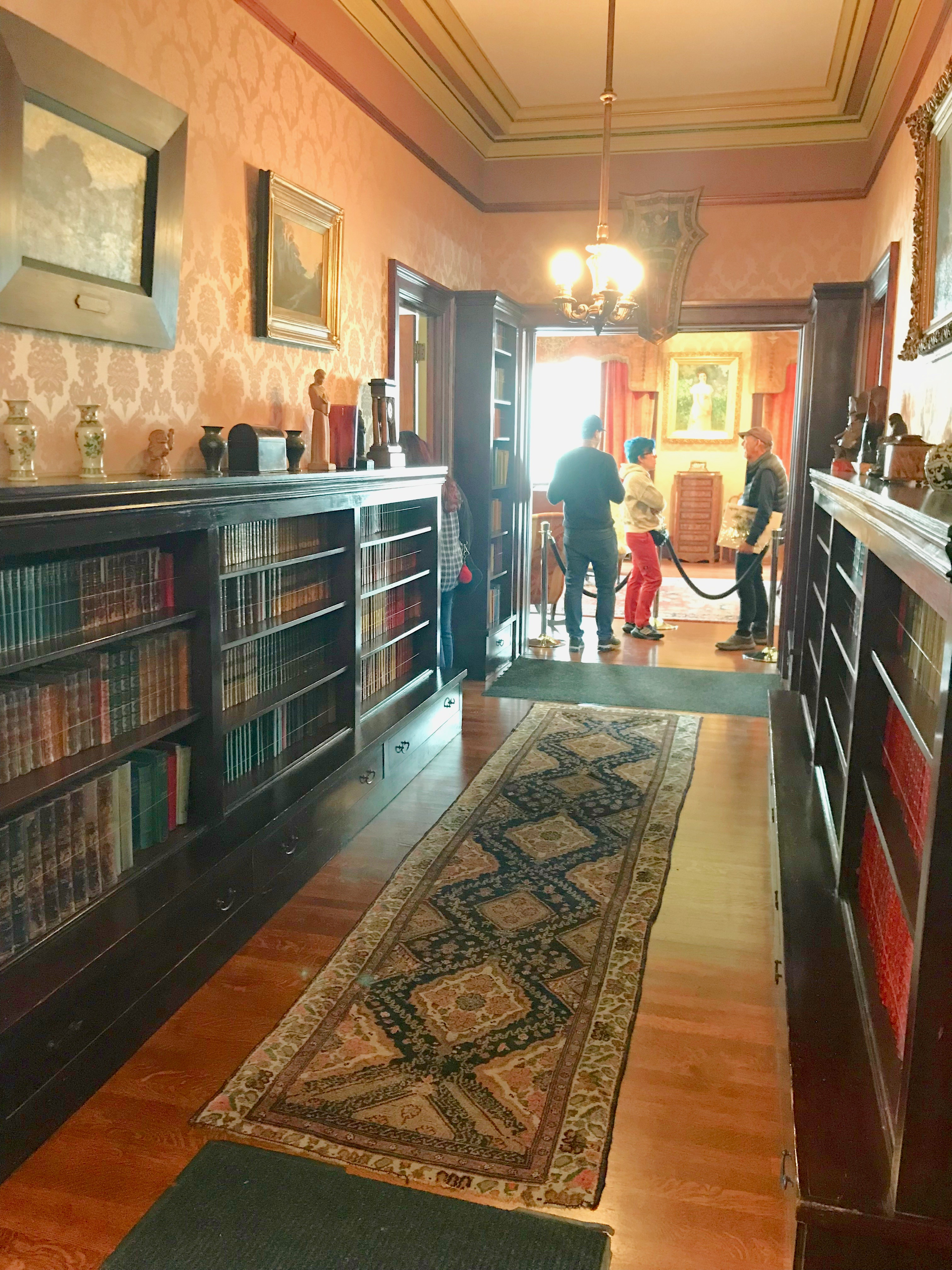
A look inside a corridor of the Fenyes Mansion.

In 1993, the History Center was completed to house the research library and archival storage areas for the museum's growing collections. In 2000, the museum added galleries, conference rooms, a museum store, and administrative offices.

The museum is open to the public and offers special exhibits, tours, lectures, seminars and workshops on aspects of local architecture, fine art, literature, science, social issues, personal histories, and exceptional historic achievements.(1) Tours are also offered to students in area schools. Pasadena Museum of History is supported by admission fees, and donations from corporations, businesses, foundations and members of the Museum.

== Archives and collections ==
Pasadena Museum of History's Research Library and Archives maintains the area's largest and most comprehensive collection of documents and artifacts related to the history of the city. The Research Library contains well over 1,000,000 historic photos, rare books, manuscripts and maps, architectural records, and more. The museum collection includes an extensive art collection, including paintings from local plein air painters, as well as textiles, ceramics, furnishings and other three-dimensional materials of historic importance to the area. The museum's costume and textile collection includes more than 3,000 artifacts dating from 1880 to 1970.

Approximately one million photographic images, some in negative format only, are contained in the museum's extensive photo archives which feature work by important early Pasadena photographers from the late 19th century as well as photo albums, stereographs, and postcards. The museum also houses photo collections from the Pasadena Star-News and local photographers J. Allen Hawkins and Flag Studios. The museum's newspaper archive includes 15 linear feet of local newspapers, including bound copies of the Pasadena Star from 1886 to 1924. The research library houses approximately a thousand books and more than 300 manuscripts dating from the 1830s to the present.

The archives also contain Design and Historic Preservation Reports of the Pasadena Planning Department, Pasadena city directories, and historic maps of Pasadena and the West San Gabriel Valley, including a set of Sanborn fire insurance maps for Pasadena.

The archives house more than 150 special collections donated by individuals, organizations, and individuals active in Pasadena. These include the Sylvanus Marston Collection of architectural drawings; the Tournament of Roses Collection; the Giddings-Hollingsworth Family Collection; the Fenyes-Curtin-Paloheimo Papers; the Black History Collection; and the Hugh Anderson/Model Grocery Company Collection. Special collections are listed on the museum's website, and some are available through the Online Archives of California website.

The Research Library and Archives are located on the lower level of the History Center and open Thursday through Sunday from 1-4 p.m. Free parking is available at the museum lot.

== Family Collection ==
An extensive collection of decorative arts, paintings, costumes/ textiles, and family papers from the Fenyes family is housed at Pasadena Museum of History, and in the Fenyes Mansion itself. Built in 1906, the Fenyes Mansion is a historic property that housed four generations of the Fenyes-Curtin-Paloheimo family and a Pasadena Cultural Landmark.

The museum maintains the Fenyes Mansion in traditional Edwardian fashion, and the interior includes handsome furniture and period furnishings. The museum offers docent-led tours of the mansion and surrounding gardens on a regular basis. The Fenyes Family collection includes more than 3,800 watercolors and sketches painted by Eva Scott Fényes, an artist and traveler who lived from 1849 to 1930, as well as fine and decorative art donated by the family to the museum. Another part of the families collections and archives is kept at their Santa Fe home Acequia Madre House.
