= Finnish Folk Art Museum =

- The Finnish Folk Art Museum
- U.S. National Register of Historic Places
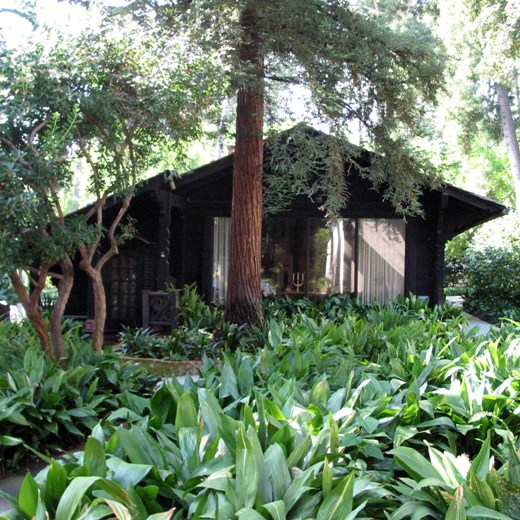
- Exterior of the Museum

- Location within California Location within the United States
- Location: 160-170 N. Orange Grove Blvd., Pasadena, California
- Coordinates: 34°8′56″N 118°9′37″W
- Area: 2.6 acres (1.1 ha)
- Built: 1910
- Architect: Frederick Roehrig
- Architectural style: Swiss Chalet
- NRHP reference No.: 85001983.
- Added to NRHP: September 5, 1985

The Finnish Folk Art Museum is located on the grounds of the Pasadena Museum of History in Pasadena, California. The only museum of its type in the United States, it was created in 1974 by Yrjö Alfred Paloheimo, a native of Finland, who was the husband of Leonora “Babsie” Curtin.

Paloheimo served as Finland's consular officer in Southern California, Arizona, and New Mexico. For 17 years, Finland's consulate offices were located in the mansion. Paloheimo founded the Finlandia Foundation and established Järvenpää, Finland, as Pasadena's sister city in that country. He and his wife also adopted four Finnish children who were reared on the Fenyes Estate.

The Swiss chalet-like structure, constructed of redwood with a stone roof, was built in 1910 as a garage for Arthur Fleming's Wigmore Estate. Fleming's architect, Frederick Roehrig, also designed portions of the Green Hotel in Pasadena. In 1949 Paloheimo learned that the unusual structure was for sale, and moved it onto the grounds of the Fenyes Estate to serve as a folk art museum, guest house, and sauna. Paloheimo filled the building with farmhouse furnishings he collected from several provinces in Finland, and did much of the stone work and gardening himself. The museum have large areas of lawn, with the beautiful Fenyes Mansion as a background, are ideal for wandering.

Inside the museum, a large living room called a “Tupa” is furnished with early 19th Century Finnish peasant furniture and objects. Visitors may see an open hearth or “Takka” used for heating and cooking, poles and overhead racks called “Leipävartaat” for storing rye sourdough bread, and “Tuoli” or chairs hand-carved by farmers as bridal gifts to their daughters, as well as many other Finnish hand-made items.

The Finnish Folk Art Museum and Finlandia Gardens were officially dedicated in 1974. Currently maintained by the Pasadena Museum of History, tours of the folk art museum are often included in Feynes Estate tours

== Gallery ==
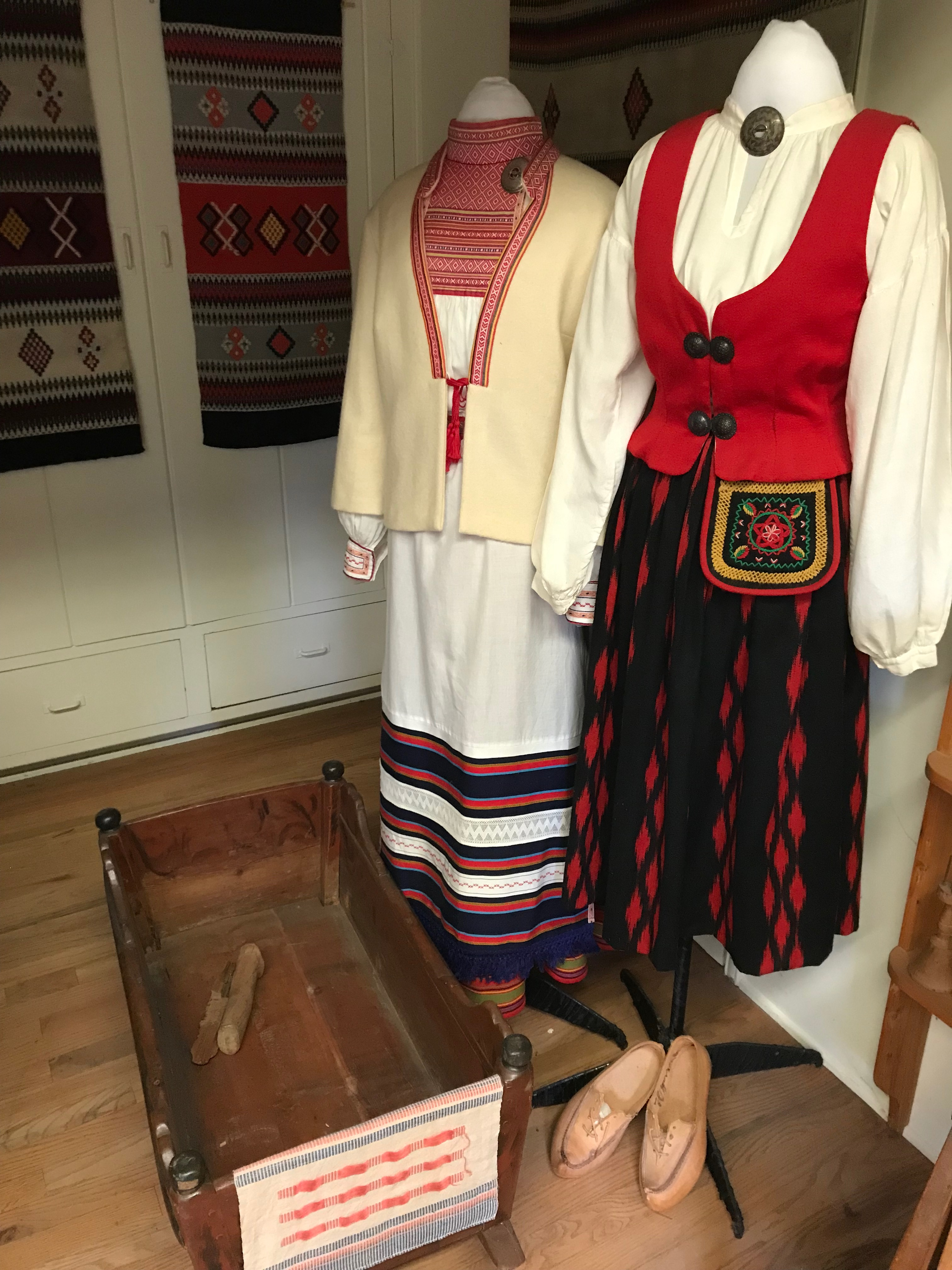
Traditional Finnish clothing on display.

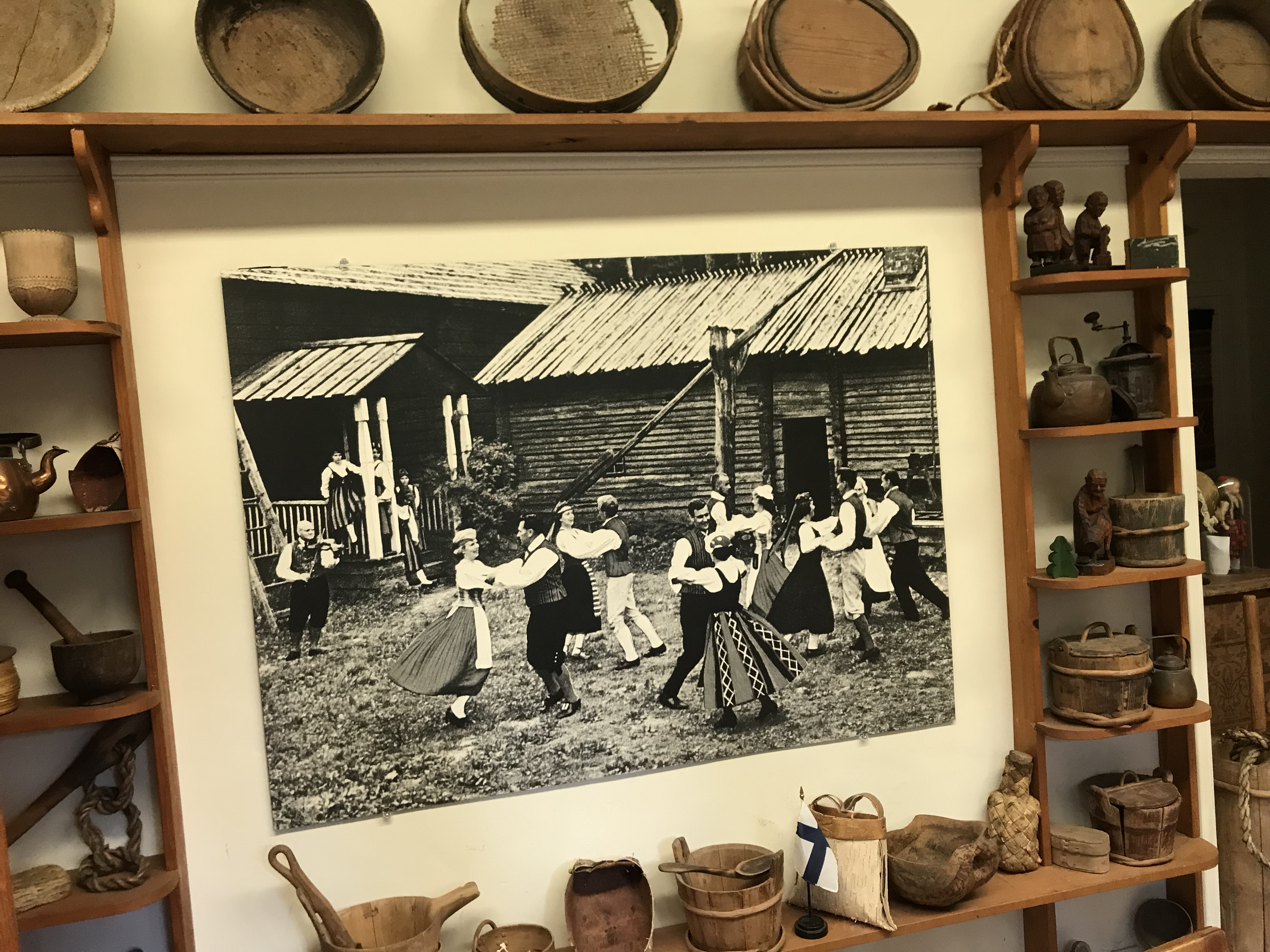
Finnish woodwork on display.

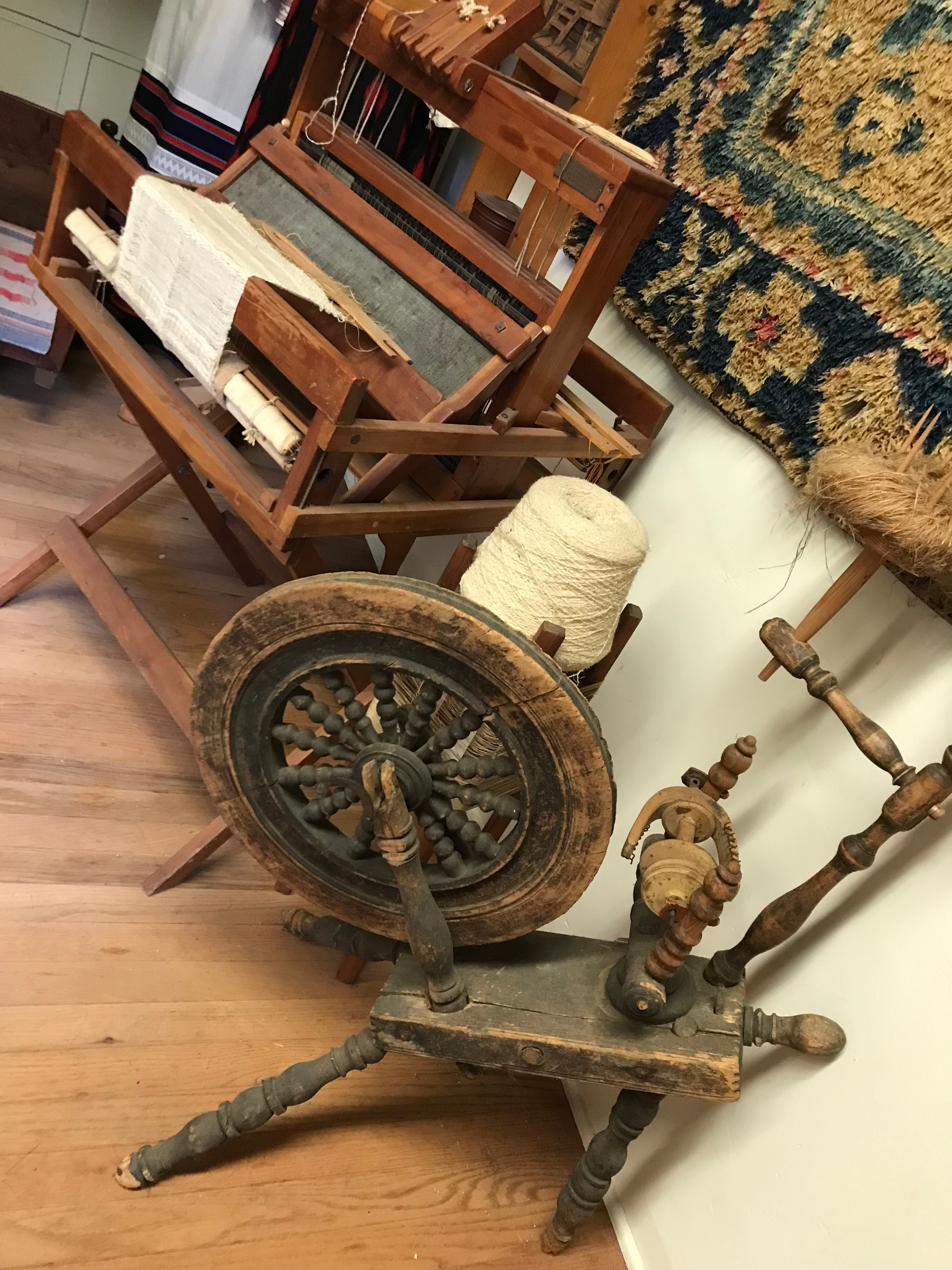
Spinning and weaving accoutrements on display.

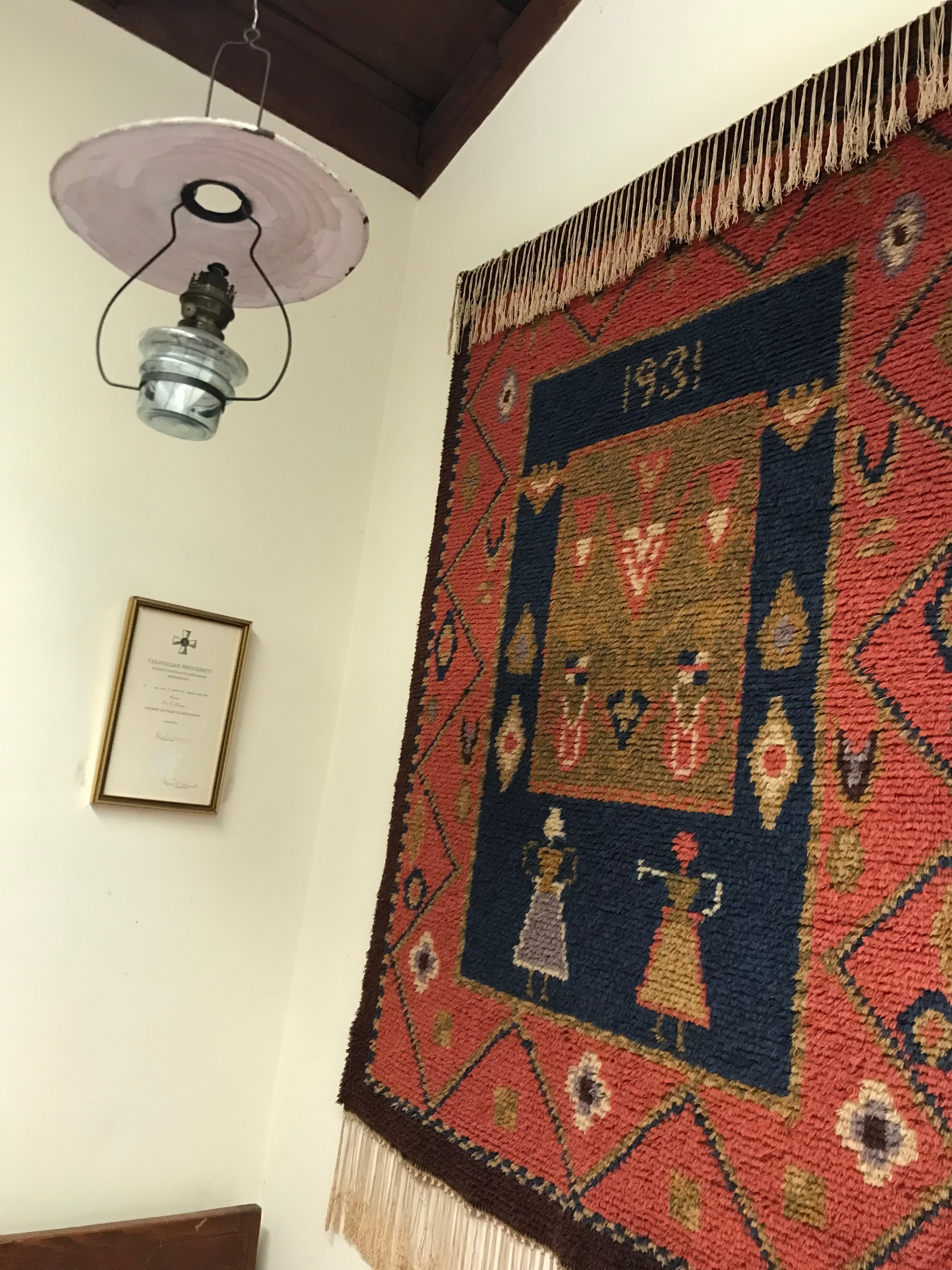
Traditional Finnish rug on display.

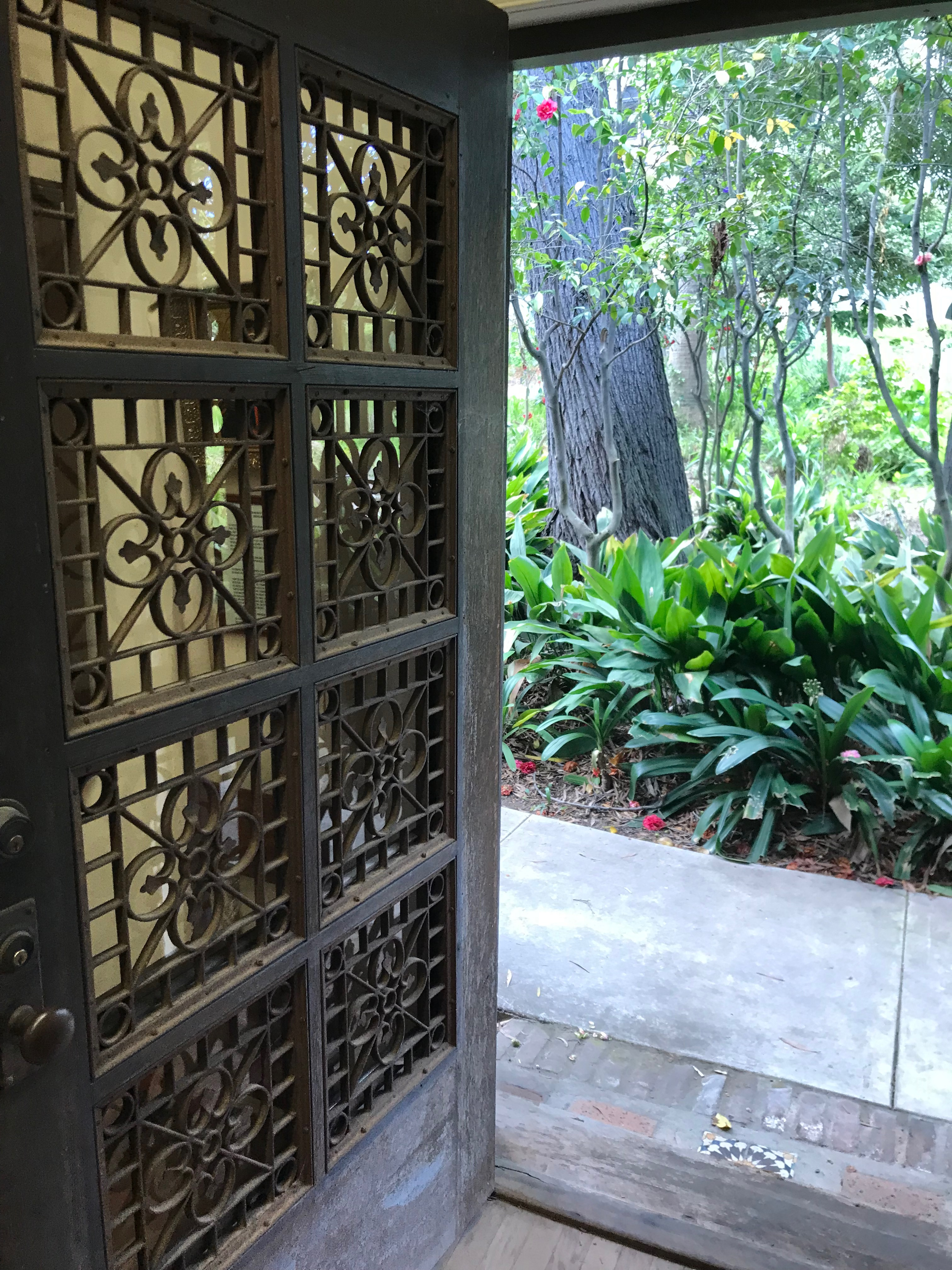
Ironwork door into the museum.

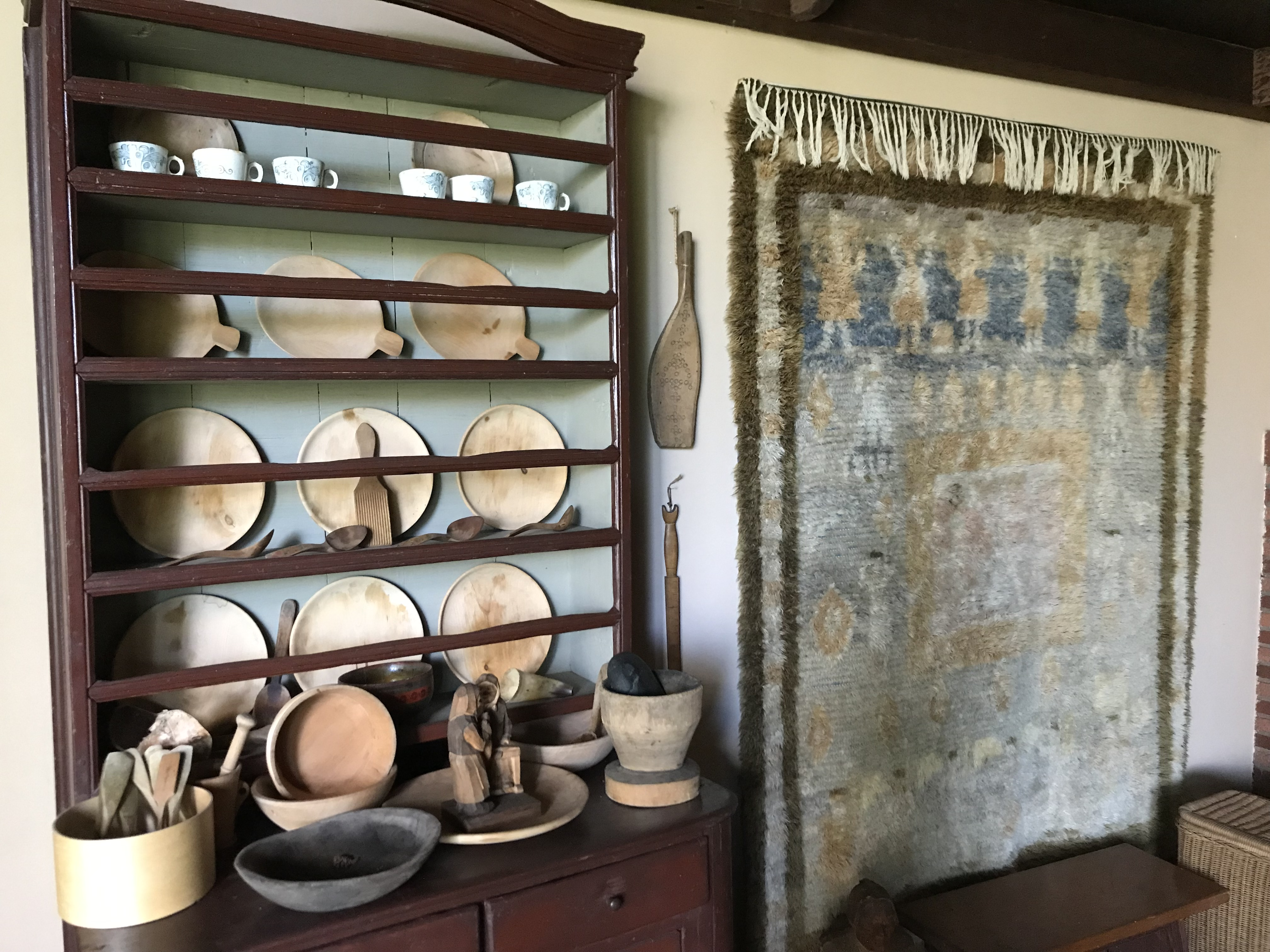
A look inside the Finnish Folk Art Museum.

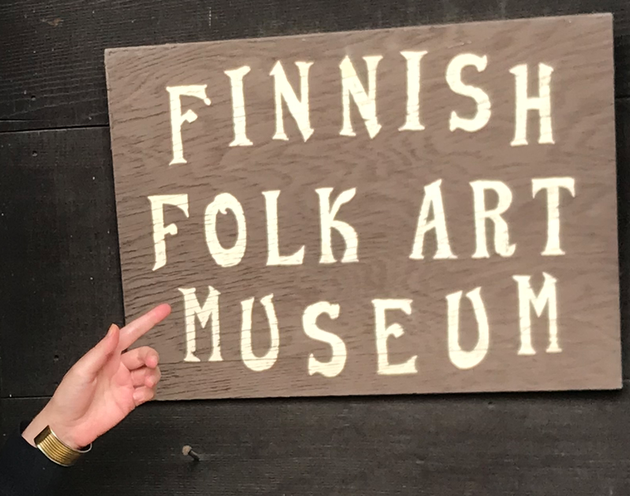
The Finnish Folk Art Museum sign.

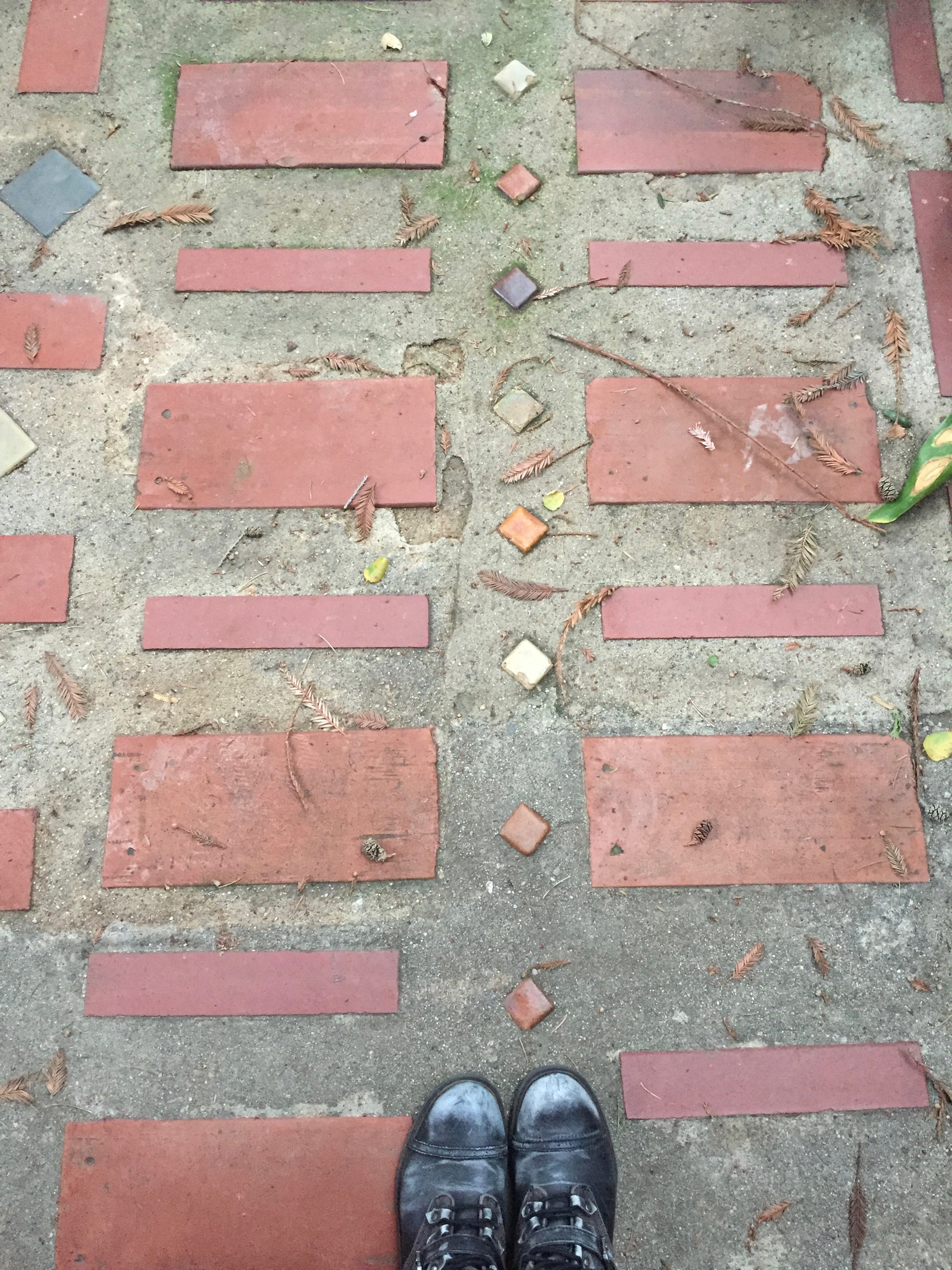
Brick and tilework outside the museum.
