= Frank Applegate =

American artist and writer

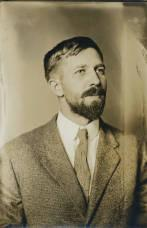
- Frank Applegate., circa 1910s
- Born: February 8, 1881; Atlanta, Illinois
- Died: February 12, 1931 (aged 50)
- Education: University of Illinois (B.A.); Pennsylvania Academy of the Fine Arts; Académie Julian
- Known for: Watercolor, oil painting, ceramics, wood carvings

Frank Guy Applegate (February 8, 1881 – February 12, 1931) was a visual artist, collector and author who was active in Santa Fe, New Mexico in the early 20th century.

== Early life and education ==
Applegate was born in Atlanta, Illinois, and moved to Santa Fe in 1921, where he worked as an artist and collected Spanish Colonial works of art. He was educated at the University of Illinois where he received a B.A. degree in 1906, he later attended the Pennsylvania Academy of the Fine Arts, and the Academy Julien in Paris.

== Work ==
In 1925 he purchased the historical De la Peña House in Santa Fe. Built in 1845, the farmhouse house is an example of early-mid 19th century Spanish Pueblo adobe architecture. In 1937 the house was recorded in the Historic America Buildings Survey of the National Park Service. He later built a compound of homes on the property along Camino de Monte Sol for himself and the artists of the Los Cinco Pintores collective of painters including Joseph Bakos, Fremont Ellis, Willard Nash, and Will Shuster. It is thought that Walter Mruk of Los Cincos Pintores purchased Applegate's house. The artists in the collective, with the possible exception of Mruk, worked together in building the compound homes, working under the guidance of Applegate.

Applegate was a watercolor and oil painter, and also produced ceramics and wood carvings. He exhibited his work at the Santa Fe Museum of Fine Arts, the San Diego Museum, Los Angeles County Museum the Art Institute of Chicago, the Denver Art Museum among other venues.

Applegate collected arts and crafts made by Native American artists, as well as works by Hispanic santeros, saint carvers. He and the writer, Mary Hunter Austin founded the Spanish Colonial Arts Society which continues to operate the annual Spanish Market held in Santa Fe.

Applegate wrote and illustrated several books during his lifetime including Indian Stories from the Pueblos (1929); his book Native Tales of New Mexico was published posthumously in 1932.

== Legacy ==
The Frank G. Applegate Papers (1886–2000) and the Frank G. Applegate Photograph Collection are held in the Southwest Research Center of the University of New Mexico.

A monograph of his work, Frank Applegate of Santa Fe: Artist and Preservationist, was published in 2001.

== See also ==
- Santa Fe art colony
- Taos Society of Artists
