= Fremont Ellis =

American artist (1897–1985)

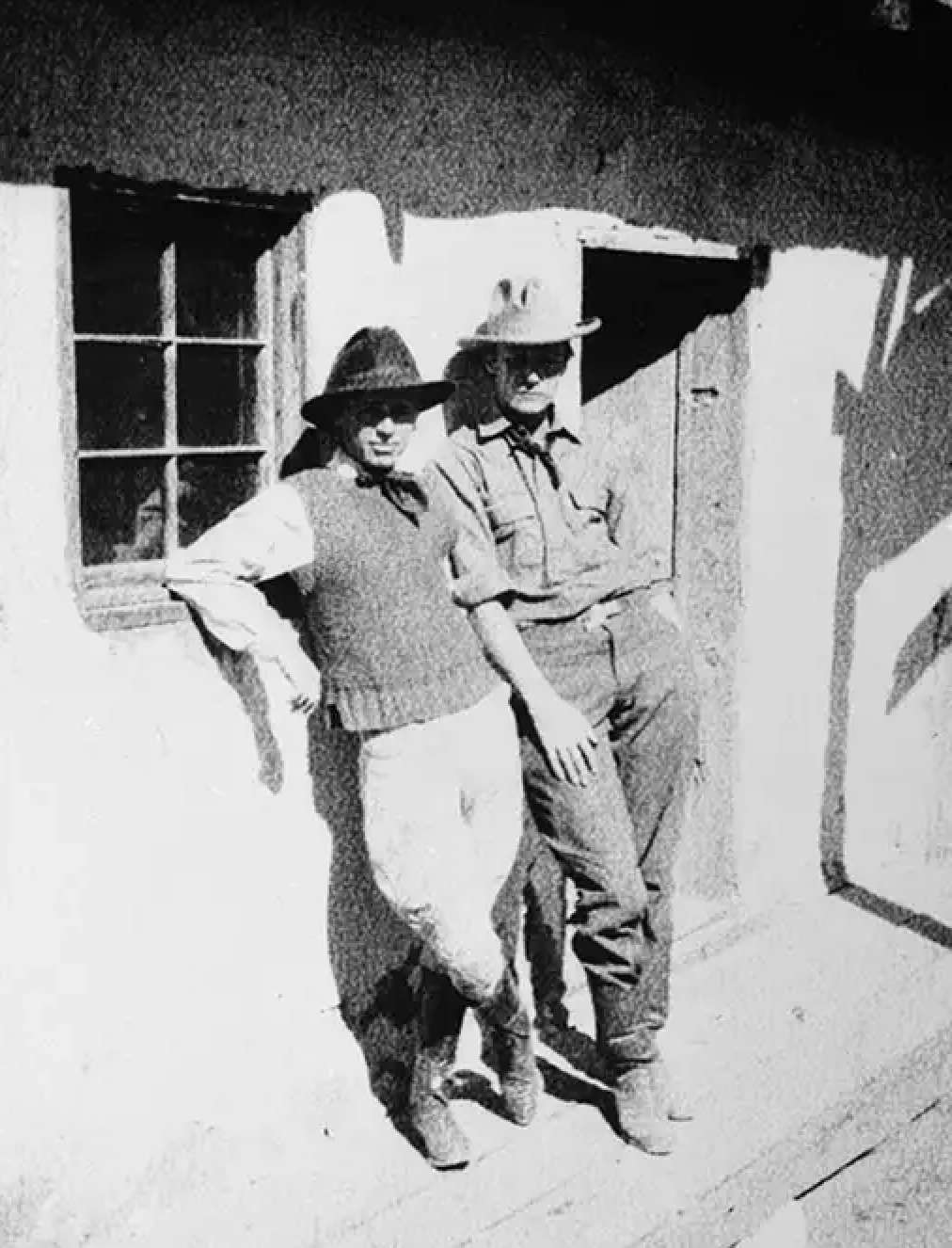
- Fremont Ellis (L) and Willard Nash (R) in Canyoncito, NM in 1920
- Born: 1897; Virginia City, Montana, United States
- Died: 1985 (aged 87–88)
- Style: Modernism
- Awards: Huntington Award – Best landscape (1924); Hazel Hyde Morrison Prize; Bronze medal – Oakland Museum; Gold medal – National Cowboy Hall of Fame (1975)

Fremont Ellis (1897–1985) was the youngest member of Los Cinco Pintores, a group of early 20th century artists who lived in Santa Fe, New Mexico.

Ellis was born and raised in Virginia City, Montana. He was primarily self-taught, and was not formally educated beyond the first grade of elementary school. At the age of 13 he began painting and in 1915, he attended the Art Students League of New York for three months. In 1919 he moved to Santa Fe, New Mexico, and then spent time in California before returning to Santa Fe. In 1921, he, along with fellow artists Will Shuster, Willard Nash, Joseph Bakos and Walter Mruk founded the Los Cinco Pintores artists colony on Camino del Monte Sol. The group of artists built a compound of adjacent homes on Camino del Monte Sol on a tract of land owned by the archaeologist/artist Frank Applegate. He exhibited his work together with the collective until 1926 when the group disbanded.

Ellis' work was exhibited in a solo show at the Los Angeles County Museum of Art in 1922. His work is held in the permanent collections of the New Mexico Museum of Art, the Gilcrease Museum, the El Paso Museum, among other venues.

== See also ==
- Taos Society of Artists
- Santa Fe art colony
