= Camino del Monte Sol Historic District =

Historic district in New Mexico, United States

- U.S. National Register of Historic Places
- U.S. Historic district

- Location within New Mexico
- Location: Roughly bounded by Acequia Madre, Camino del Monte Sol, El Caminito, and Garcia St., Santa Fe, New Mexico
- Coordinates: 35°40′41″N 105°55′46″W
- Area: 52.1 acres (21.1 ha)
- Architect: John Gaw Meem
- Architectural style: Late 19th and Early 20th Century American Movements, Pueblo, Territorial Revival
- NRHP reference No.: 88000440
- Added to NRHP: July 11, 1988

The Camino del Monte Sol Historic District, in Santa Fe, New Mexico, is a 52.1 acres (21.1 ha) historic district which was listed on the National Register of Historic Places in 1988. The listing included 106 contributing buildings.

It includes some works by architect John Gaw Meem, and works by notable artists if not certified architects.

The district is in the southeast corner of Santa Fe, to the south of the Santa Fe River, and extends south of the Acequia Madre (Mother Ditch). It consists mostly of north-south streets. It adjoins the National Register-listed Santa Fe Historic District to the north and west. It is roughly bounded by the Acequia Madre, Camino del Monte Sol, El Caminito, and Garcia St.

Its significance was described in its 1987 National Register nomination:

Beginning in the years following New Mexican statehood in 1912, and continuing until World War II, this district was the center of a nationally known colony of artists, a remarkable group of multi-talented, creative people, many of whom had national reputations before settling in a remote and little known region of the country. These artists made important contributions not only to their own fields, primarily literature and painting, but also to the community to the extent that they can be considered in large part responsible for the unique milieu of Santa Fe today. Although no longer functioning as a colony, many creative people continue to live in Santa Fe and contribute to its character. The city depends heavily on tourists who are drawn not only by its 150 galleries many of which specialize in Indian and Spanish artists and regional art, and by its yearly markets and traditions like the annual Fiesta, but also by the special environment created by its architecture. The artists who founded Santa Fe's original art colony were drawn to the region by its pre-American cultures and were instrumental in efforts to preserve and revive the fine arts, crafts, customs, and architecture of those cultures. The artists* colony had perhaps its most widely felt impact in the field of architecture. Although the movement to preserve and recreate the city's historic adobe architecture was already under way when the colony began to come together on the Camino del Monte Sol, the artists joined it with vigor, leading efforts to preserve historic architecture and building their own Pueblo Revival adobe houses. The district also contains some of the first houses designed by John Gaw Meem, the premier professional architect of the Revival styles. It has remained a residential neighborhood, unlike Canyon Road, a street north of the boundary of this district and included in the Santa Fe Historic District, where artists lived which has become predominantly commercial. The artists' homes on the Camino del Monte Sol and adjoining streets are a unique grouping of Pueblo Revival and, to a much lesser extent, Territorial Revival dwellings, built by the group who played a significant role in the conversion of Santa Fe into a city which is dominated by historic styles.

The district includes:

- Acequia Madre House, 614 Acequia Madre, associated with artists Eva Scott Fényes (1849–1930) and her granddaughter Leonora Frances Curtin Paloheimo (1903–1999). The house contained hundreds of works by them and by many other artists, including invited self-portraits. It also included traditional arts and crafts from New Mexico associated with the Spanish Colonial Arts Society (founded in 1925) and the Native Market on West Palace Avenue in Santa Fe (founded in 1934), and also works collected in their international travels which were partly used to inspire local arts and crafts. The house, since 2013, has also been home of the Women's International Study Center.

Other artists "who were leaders of the art colony and prime contributors to the architectural and cultural character" of the district include:

- Alice Corbin Henderson (1881-1949) and William Penhallow Henderson (1877-1943), of 555 Camino del Monte Sol and 557 Camino del Monte Sol;
- Frank Applegate, of 830 El Caminito, 831 El Caminito, and 408 Camino del Monte Sol;
- Fremont Ellis, 586 Camino del Monte Sol, one of Los Cinco Pintores;
- Walter Mruk, of 542 Camino del Monte Sol, one of Los Cinco Pintores;
- Joseph Bakos (1891-1977), of 576 Camino del Monte Sol, one of Los Cinco Pintores;
- Willard Nash (1898-1943), of 566 Camino del Monte Sol, one of Los Cinco Pintores;
- Will Shuster of 580 Camino del Monte Sol, one of Los Cinco Pintores;
- Andrew Dasburg (1887–1979), of 520 Camino del Monte Sol and 524 Camino del Monte Sol;
- Datus Myers and Alice Clark Myers, of 503 Camino del Monte Sol;
- Mary Hunter Austin (1868-1934), of 439 Camino del Monte Sol;
- Alfred Morang (1901-1958), of 1 Placita Rafaela;
- Lynn Riggs (1899-1954), of 770 Acequia Madre Road;
- Philip Stevenson (d.1965), of 408 Delgado Street; Stevenson bought the home in 1930 and lived there until about 1939. He was a novelist and screenwriter sympathetic to Communism, who, along with his wife Janet Stevenson, was blacklisted. The home was in a Garcia family from 1848 to 1920. The eastern half of the property was owned and remodeled by John Gaw Meem in 1954, for Marian Gebhardt. Gebhardt "made it her home and established the well-known Children's Patio Day School in an L-shaped addition created along the Acequia Madre and Delgado Street by connecting an adobe outbuilding to the house. The pegs where the children hung their coats are still to be seen." and
- Elizabeth DeHuff (1886–1983), of 828 Camino del Poniente.
