= William Penhallow Henderson =

American artist

William P. Henderson
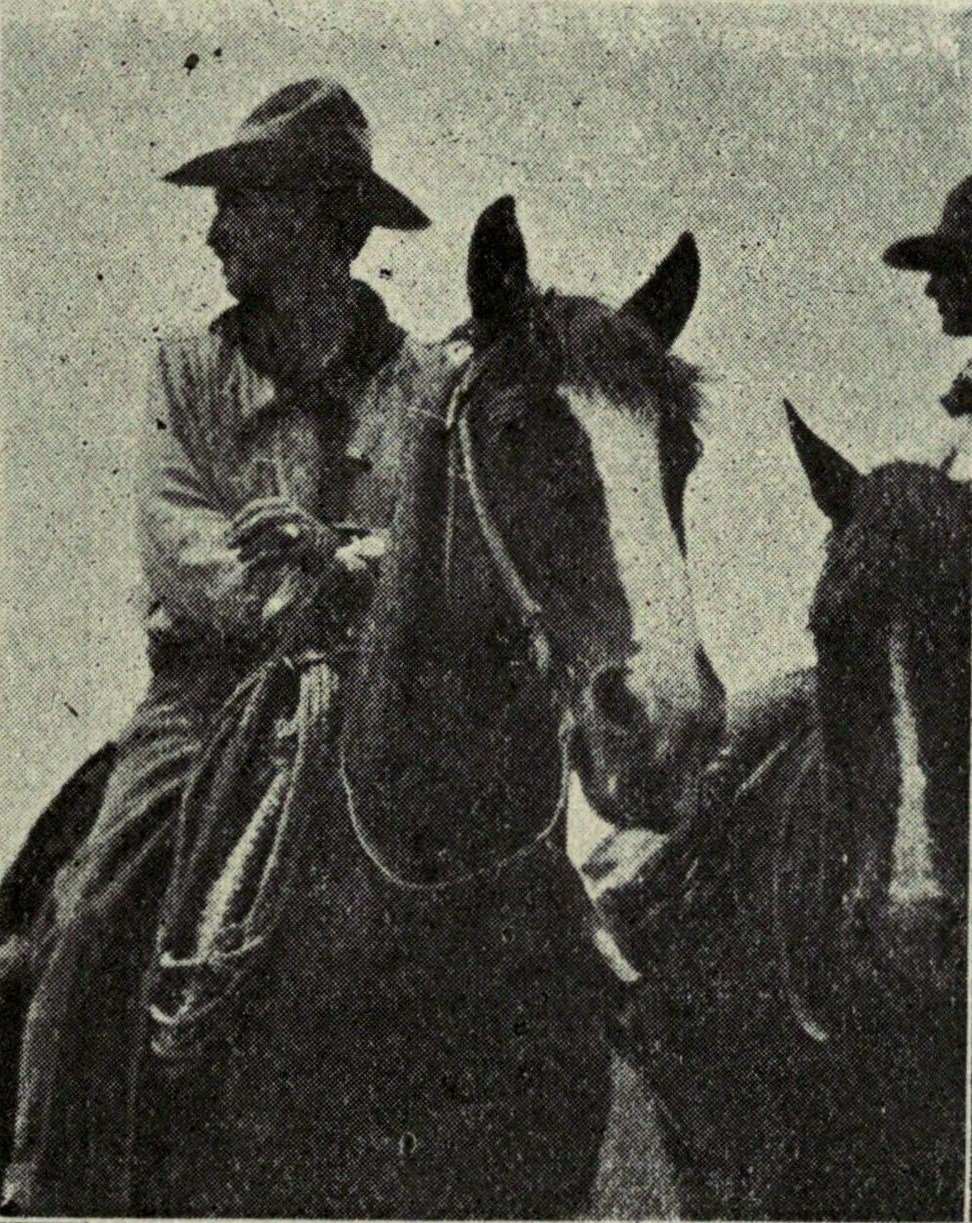
- William Penhallow Henderson, c. 1921
- Born: June 4, 1877; Medford, Massachusetts
- Died: October 15, 1943 (aged 66); Tesuque, New Mexico
- Resting place: Fairview Cemetery (Santa Fe, New Mexico)
- Education: Edmund Charles Tarbell
- Alma mater: Massachusetts Normal Art School
- Known for: Painting, architecture
- Spouse: Alice Corbin

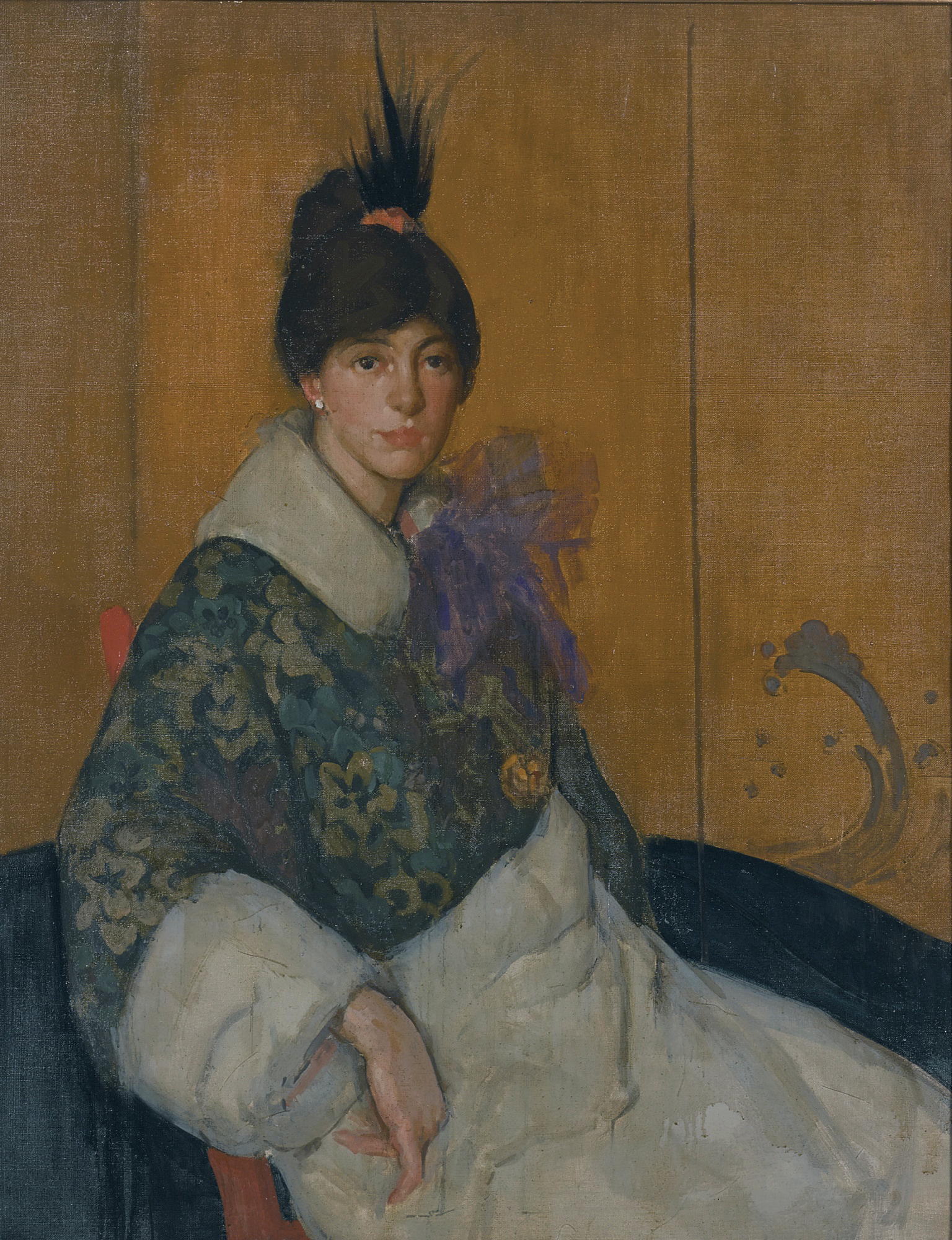
The green cloak (1912)

William Penhallow Henderson (1877–1943) was an American painter, architect, and furniture designer.

== Early life and education ==
William Penhallow Henderson was born in 1877 in Medford, Massachusetts. His father, William Oliver Henderson, was a friend of painter William Edward Norton and an amateur painter himself. During Henderson's childhood, the family moved several times, settling in Turkey Creek, Texas in 1879 and in Clifton, Kansas in 1886.

Returning to Boston in 1891, Henderson studied at the Massachusetts Normal Art School and, in 1899, entered the School of the Boston Museum of Fine Arts, studying under Edmund Charles Tarbell. In the following year, he won the Paige Traveling Scholarship for two years of study in Europe. His travels, from 1902–1903, included London, where he became acquainted with the family of John Singer Sargent. He also traveled to Paris, Berlin, Dresden, Madrid, and the Azores.

== Career ==
From 1904 to 1910, Henderson taught at the Academy of Fine Arts in Chicago. In 1904 he painted in Mexico and Arizona with colleague Carl N. Werntz. In 1905 he married Alice Corbin, a poet and assistant editor of Poetry Magazine. Their only child, Alice Oliver Henderson, was born in 1907.

Between 1906 and 1907 Henderson completed ten murals for the Joliet Township High School. Mrs. Henderson's book Anderson's Best Fairy Tales, illustrated by her husband, provided the funds for a second trip to Europe from 1910-1911. In 1914, Henderson built a house and studio of his own design at Lake Bluff, Illinois, and in the same year he was commissioned by Frank Lloyd Wright to design murals for Midway Gardens, Chicago. Unfortunately, the murals were painted over shortly after completion. In the following year, he designed the scenery and costumes for the Chicago Fine Arts Theatre production of Alice in Wonderland.

Because his wife Alice Corbin Henderson had tuberculosis, the Hendersons moved to Santa Fe, New Mexico in 1916. In 1918 Henderson was employed by the U.S. Shipping Board Emergency Fleet Corporation in San Francisco to paint camouflage onto the hulls of ships during World War I.

In 1925 Henderson, with his first son-in-law John Evans, formed the Pueblo-Spanish Building Company, through which he designed and built many private homes and some public buildings, including the Railroad Ticket Office in Santa Fe. The home he built for Fremont Ellis on Canyon Road in Santa Fe still stands. Henderson was also successful at designing carved wooden furniture which are considered the finest made at the time. In the mid-1930s, he was appointed to the Federal Arts Project, for which he completed easel paintings and six murals for the Santa Fe Federal Court Building.

In 1937, Henderson designed the Navajo House of Religion, built in the style of a Navajo hogan, in Santa Fe. It is now called the Wheelwright Museum of the American Indian. The museum's earliest names were the Navajo House of Prayer and House of Navajo Religion, but soon after it opened to the public its name officially became the Museum of Navajo Ceremonial Art.

In 1938, Henderson completed the six WPA murals begun by Gerald Cassidy for the U.S. Courthouse (Santa Fe, New Mexico).

Henderson died in 1943 in Tesuque, New Mexico. His art resides in the permanent collections of the Art Institute of Chicago, Denver Art Association, New Mexico Museum of Art, Taos Art Museum and the Albuquerque Museum of Art and History.

The Santa Fe home of he and his wife, at 555-57 Camino del Monte Sol, is listed on the National Register of Historic Places as a contributing building in the Camino del Monte Sol Historic District.
