= Dorothy Morang =

American painter, pastelist

- Born: Dorothy Alden Clark; November 24, 1906; Bridgton, Maine
- Died: December 19, 1994 (aged 88)
- Resting place: Santa Fe National Cemetery
- Education: Alfred Morang, Raymond Jonson, Emil Bisttram
- Alma mater: New England Conservatory of Music
- Known for: painting
- Style: Nonobjective art
- Movement: Transcendental Painting Group
- Spouse(s): Alfred Morang; John Emmett

Dorothy Morang (1906–1994) was an American painter, pastelist, and active member of the Santa Fe art colony.

Dorothy Alden Clark was born in Bridgton, Maine on November 24, 1906. Her early formal study was in music at the New England Conservatory of Music in Boston and she taught piano throughout most of her life. She married artist/critic Alfred Morang June 13, 1930 and they moved to New Mexico in 1937 upon a doctor's recommendation that Alfred needed a higher, drier climate.

Primarily self-taught, Morang painted abstract easel paintings with the WPA Art Project from 1939 to 1941 and later taught piano and music appreciation for the Music Project. She was associated with the Transcendental Painting Group, but was not an official member. Her artwork has been exhibited in New Mexico and nationally. Notably, her work was included in an exhibition at the Guggenheim Museum in New York in 1940, and presented in solo exhibitions at Paneras Gallery, New York, New York, in 1963 and 1965. She also worked in a variety of positions at the New Mexico Museum of Art from 1942 through 1963, including Curator of Fine Arts. Her work can be found in the collections of the New Mexico Museum of Art, University of New Mexico Fine Art Museum and West Texas Teacher's College Museum. In 1949 she helped found the Santa Fe Women Artists Exhibiting Group.

In 1950 Dorothy divorced Alfred Morang, and was remarried 15 years later to John C. Emmett. She died at the age of 88 on December 19, 1994.
