= Alice Corbin Henderson =

American writer

- Born: Alice Corbin; April 16, 1881; St. Louis, Missouri
- Died: July 18, 1949 (aged 68); Tesuque, New Mexico
- Resting place: Fairview Cemetery (Santa Fe, New Mexico)
- Education: University of Chicago; Newcomb College
- Occupation: Writer
- Spouse: William Penhallow Henderson
- Children: Alice Rossin

Alice Corbin Henderson (April 16, 1881 – July 18, 1949) was an American poet, author and poetry editor.

== Early life and education ==
Alice Corbin was born in St. Louis, Missouri. Her mother died in 1884 and she was briefly sent to live with her father's cousin Alice Mallory Richardson in Chicago before returning to her father in Kansas after his remarriage in 1891.

Corbin attended the University of Chicago, and in 1898 published a collection of poetry The Linnet Songs. In 1904 she rented a studio in the Academy of Fine Arts in Chicago, and it was there she met her future husband, William Penhallow Henderson, a painter, architect and furniture designer, who was teaching there at the time. They married on October 14, 1905.

== Career ==
In 1912 Henderson's second collection of poems, The Spinning Woman of the Sky, was published, and she became assistant editor to Harriet Monroe at Poetry magazine. She left Chicago for Santa Fe, New Mexico in 1916, after having been diagnosed with tuberculosis. She continued working on Poetry by long distance until 1922.

Like her husband, Henderson was devoted to the people and cultures of New Mexico and the Southwestern United States. She published Red Earth, Poems of New Mexico in 1920 and The Turquoise Trail, an Anthology of New Mexico Poetry in 1928. During the Depression, Corbin was Editor-in-Chief of the New Mexico Federal Writers' Project. In 1937, Henderson published Brothers of Light: The Penitentes of the Southwest, for which her husband provided the illustrations. The book was reprinted by Yucca Tree Press in 1998 (ISBN 1-881325-23-7).

She was also a supporter of Native Americans' civil rights and art. In 1920 she assembled a group of watercolor paintings by Awa Tsireh for exhibition at the Arts Club of Chicago. In 1937, Henderson helped found what is now called the Wheelwright Museum of the American Indian, and became its curator.

== Legacy ==
Many of her papers can be found in the Harry Ransom Center at the University of Texas in Austin.

The Santa Fe home of her and her husband, at 555-57 Camino del Monte Sol, is listed on the National Register of Historic Places as a contributing building in the Camino del Monte Sol Historic District.
