= Willard Nash =

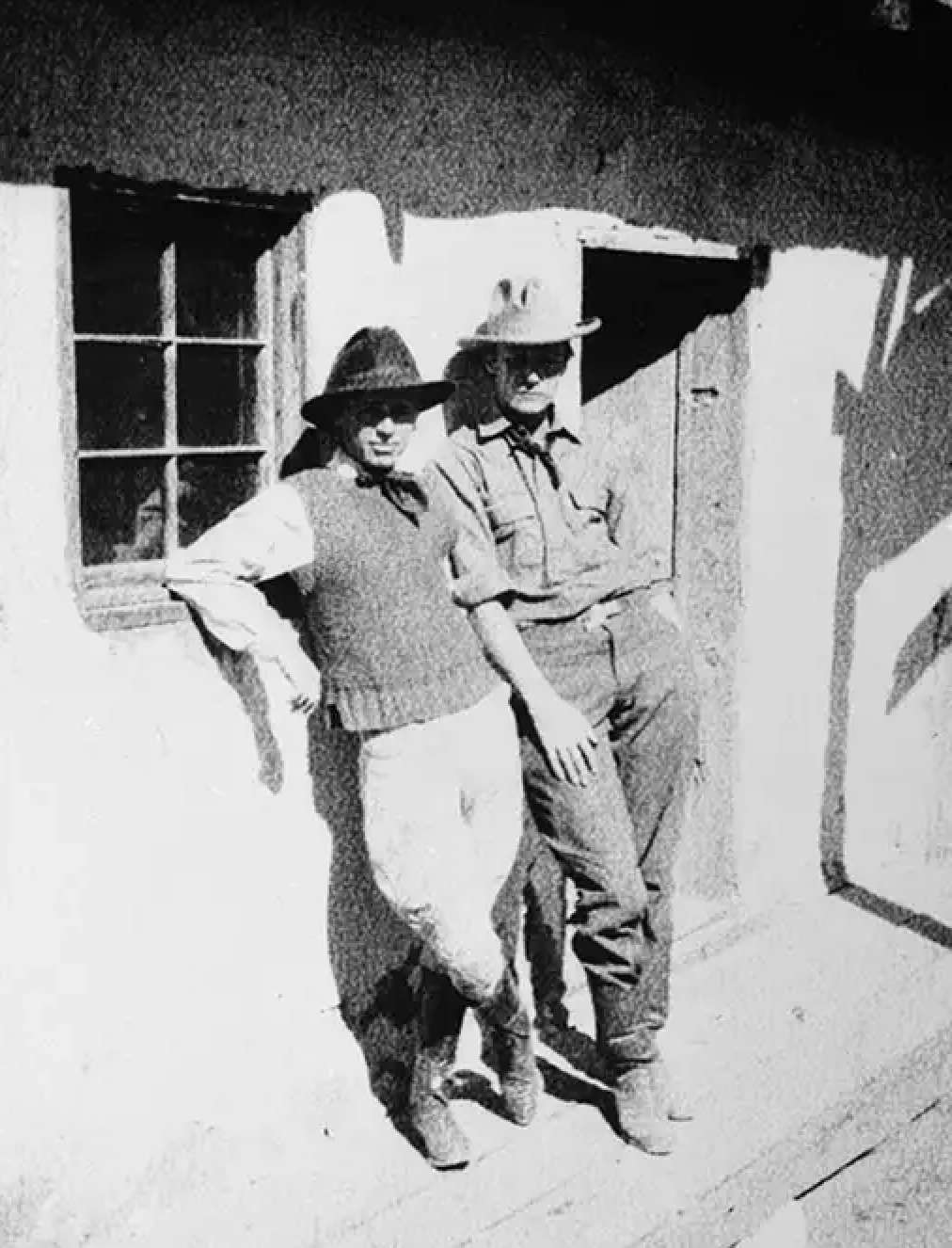
Fremont Ellis (L) and Willard Nash (R) in Canyoncito, NM in 1920

Willard Nash was an American artist best known for being a member of Los Cinco Pintores.

Willard Ayer Nash (1898 in Philadelphia, Pennsylvania – 1943 in Albuquerque) grew up in Detroit, Michigan. In Detroit he studied art with John P. Wicker and became successful as a commercial artist. He was also an amateur boxer, soprano and actor. He moved to Santa Fe, New Mexico in 1920 and became friends with the other modernist artists in the area. He found work with the Works Progress Administration, completing six panels in 1934 to be hung in the University of New Mexico's main library. In addition to painting he made a number of lithographs he printed himself. He moved to California in 1936, teaching in San Francisco and Los Angeles. His work is in the collections of the Denver Art Museum, Los Angeles County Museum of Art, University of New Mexico Art Museum and New Mexico Museum of Art.

He contributed to, and lived in, the Camino del Monte Sol Historic District in Santa Fe, New Mexico, living at 566 Camino del Monte Sol.
