= Brian O'Connor (artist) =

American visual artist (1958–2022)

- O'Connor in 2018
- Born: March 2, 1958; Albuquerque, New Mexico, U.S.
- Died: August 15, 2022 (aged 64)
- Education: Centro Andino, Quito; University of New Mexico (BFA)
- Known for: Allegorical, narrative painting
- Style: Surrealism
- Spouse: Iva Morris
- Children: 2
- Awards: 1990 Western States National Endowment for the Arts Fellowship
- Website: brianoconnorartist.com

Brian O'Connor (March 2, 1958 – August 15, 2022) was an American visual artist who worked in a surrealistic style. He lived and collaborated with his wife, Iva, in the small town of Veguita, New Mexico. The documentary film, Painting Grey, was made about his work and life.

== Early life and education ==
O'Connor was born on March 2, 1958, to Mikey and John O'Connor, in Albuquerque, New Mexico, where he was also raised. He attended college in the late 1970s at the Centro Andino in Quito, Ecuador, where he first became interested in art. In 1983 he received a Bachelors of Fine Arts degree from the University of New Mexico.

== Career ==
O'Connor's paintings have been described as socio-political narratives. His work renders figurative subjects within enigmatic situations. O'Connor has described his work as "the beautiful mess" of "grappling with the world" and attempting to make sense of it. The art writer, Diane Armitage wrote of O'Connor's work, “O’Connor is a gifted realist painter whose increasingly dark vision continues to expand as he adds to his narrative of millennial observations...what O’Connor does in his work is pose questions about our complicity with the forces of degradation that seem to increasingly govern our fate.” He has exhibited his work nationally in museums and galleries including the Albuquerque Museum, the Harwood Museum, the New Mexico Museum of Fine Arts, the San Antonio Museum of Art, the Riverside Museum of Art among other venues.

=== Honors and awards ===
From 1985 through 1987, O'Connor received several grants from the New Mexico Artist in Residence Program to work in various sites. In 1990, he received a joint fellowship from the Western States Arts Foundation and the National Endowment for the Arts.

=== Collections ===
O'Connor's works are held in the permanent collection of the New Mexico Museum of Art. His work, Flagship (2012) was commissioned by the city of Albuquerque Public Art Fund, and is on permanent exhibition at the Albuquerque City/County Government Building. His painting, 93 Million Miles, was held in the Bernalillo County public art collection from which it was stolen and never recovered.

=== Documentary film ===
In 2020, a documentary film, Painting Grey, by Ann Bromberg, was made about O'Connor's work, and how posterior cortical atrophy, a progressive brain disorder, has affected his artistic practice and daily life.

== Personal life and death ==
O'Connor was married to the painter Iva Morris. They had two children. He died on August 15, 2022, at the age of 64.
