= Santiago E. Campos United States Courthouse =

- U.S. Courthouse
- U.S. National Register of Historic Places
- NM State Register of Cultural Properties
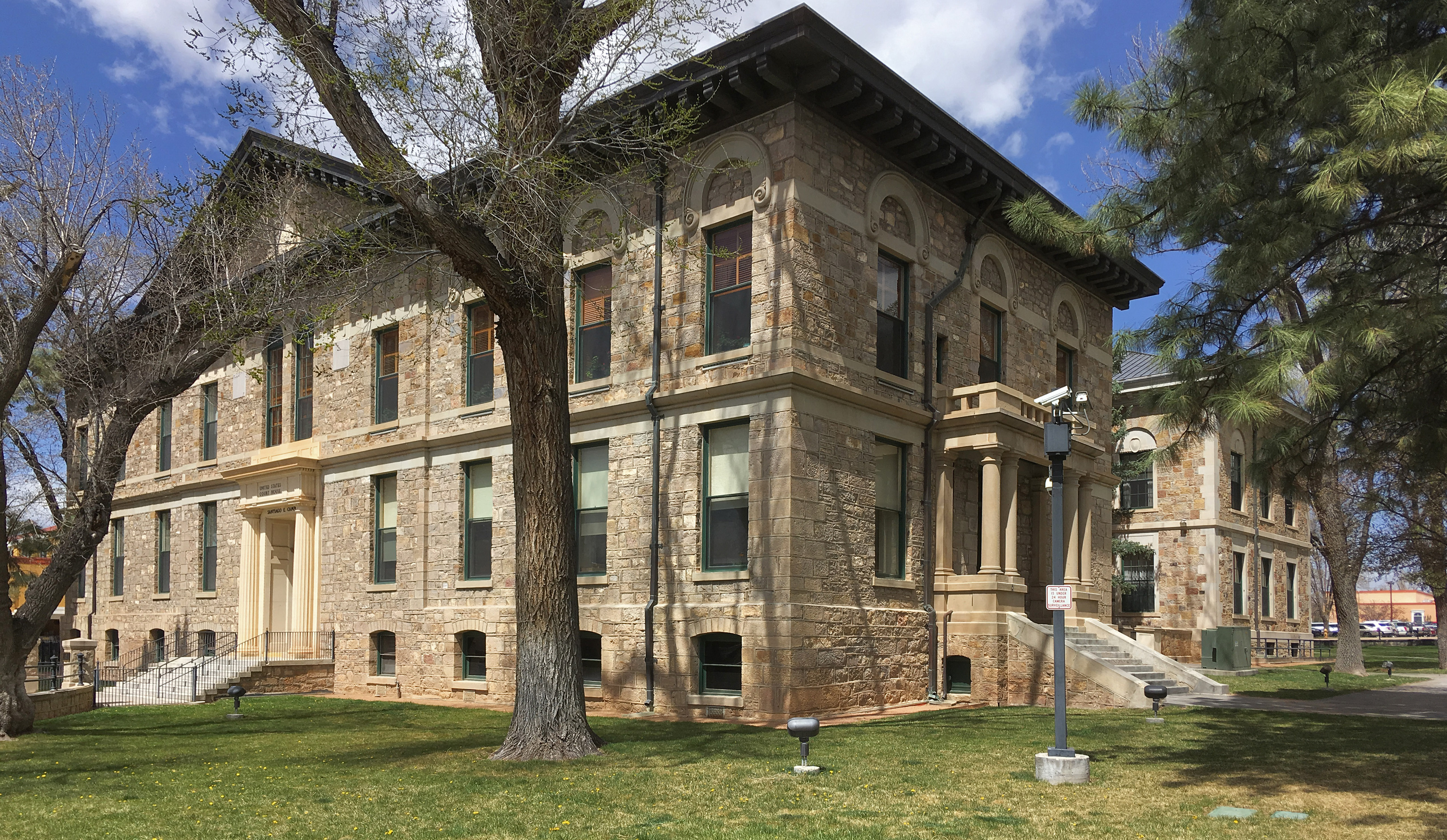

- Location within New Mexico Location within the United States
- Location: 106 S. Federal Pl., Santa Fe, New Mexico
- Coordinates: 35°41′27″N 105°56′15″W
- Area: 3 acres (1.2 ha)
- Built: 1853–1889
- Architect: Ammi B. Young
- Architectural style: Greek Revival
- Part of: Santa Fe Historic District (ID73001150)
- NRHP reference No.: 73001152
- NMSRCP No.: 244

Significant dates
- Added to NRHP: May 25, 1973
- Designated: July 23, 1973
- Designated NMSRCP: March 13, 1972

The Santiago E. Campos United States Courthouse is a historic courthouse building located at Santa Fe in Santa Fe County, New Mexico. Formerly designated simply as the United States Courthouse, it was renamed for the late District Judge Santiago E. Campos in 2004.

== Building history ==
The building had its beginnings as the proposed territorial capitol for New Mexico. In 1848 under the Treaty of Guadalupe Hidalgo, Mexico ceded what is now New Mexico, Arizona, California, Texas, and portions of Colorado, Utah and Nevada, to the United States. The New Mexico territorial government was established two years later. In 1851 Congress appropriated $20,000 and in 1854 an additional $50,000 to construct a "state house" on what is now Federal Plaza.

Plans for the building were prepared by the Supervising Architect of the Treasury, Ammi B. Young, perhaps based on sketches by Chief Justice Joab Houghton, a member of the U.S. Territorial Supreme Court for New Mexico. Construction began in 1853, with the walls rising one-and-one-half stories above the basement by the following year. Construction continued intermittently due to limited funding, lack of competent workmen, and difficulties imposed by the Civil War. As the years wore on, the half-built structure was essentially abandoned.

In 1883 the building grounds were chosen as the site for Santa Fe's "Tertio-Millennial" celebration, and the building shell received a temporary roof. The grounds were cleared and an oval racetrack, about 1/3 mile long, was set up surrounding the site. Indian participants were housed in the first floor during the celebration.

The "state house" was finally finished in 1889, although it was never used for this purpose. Instead, at its completion, it was occupied by a land claims court and has housed various federal courts since that time. The territorial capitol building was constructed on another site in Santa Fe between 1895 and 1900. New Mexico became a state in 1912.

As the needs of the courts exceeded the building's capacity, an addition was planned that echoed the original Greek Revival style. This addition was built in 1929-1930 under the direction of Louis A. Simon, Superintendent of the Architectural Section of the Treasury Department. It more than doubled the overall size of the courthouse.

The U.S. Courthouse was added to the National Register of Historic Places in 1973.

== Architecture ==
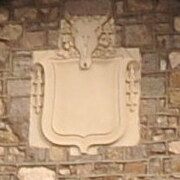
a bucranium at the top of the south wall

The courthouse is located adjacent to the Santa Fe Post Office in Federal Plaza. The plaza is enclosed by a stone wall with metal pipe railings that follows the outline of the 1883 racetrack.

The Greek Revival courthouse building, originally intended to be the capitol, was constructed in two stages; the first in 1853-1854 and the second in 1888-1889. The Greek Revival style of the original design with prominent pediment and porticos is characteristic of the work of Ammi B. Young, Supervising Architect of the Treasury Department. However, other elements of the design including the roof and second-story window treatments have a character more reminiscent of the Renaissance Revival architectural style of the late 1880s. To the north of the original building is a 1929-30 addition. Both buildings are rectangular, and are oriented parallel to each other, with the addition being slightly smaller than the original building. A two-story vestibule, built at the same time as the addition, connects the buildings at their midpoints. A semicircular projecting bay on the vestibule's east elevation encloses an elegant, interlocking cantilevered stairway.

The courthouse walls are of rough stone quarried in the Hyde Park area of the Sangre de Cristo Mountains, while details such as quoins and lintels are of dressed stone from the hills of Cerrillos, a small town about eighteen miles southwest of Santa Fe. Both buildings are two stories tall and have the same symmetrical layout. The north and south elevations of both structures are articulated by nine bays, while the shorter east and west elevations are three bays wide.

The south elevation of the original building recalls the Greek Revival style, as interpreted in the 1880s. The classical entrance with fluted Doric order pilasters and elaborate entablature replaced the original in 1929-1930. The arched windows above have ornamental stone trim. A broad pediment surmounts the center section of the elevation. Porticos with Ionic columns mark the east and west entrances, though only the one over the west entrance is original. (The east portico was constructed with the 1929-1930 addition). The windows of the first floor are of simple rectangular design; in the unfinished 1853-1854 structure, these window openings had segmental arches. The second-story windows are arched with elegant cut-stone moldings in the original building and rubble stone detailing in the addition. A copper-clad bracketed cornice supports the low-pitched, hipped copper roof.

In an 1884 ceremony attended by about 5,000 people, a sandstone obelisk erected by the Grand Army of the Republic was unveiled at the main entrance of the building. The monument honored Christopher "Kit" Carson (1809–1868), a veteran of the Mexican–American War and the American Civil War.

Six murals of landscapes are placed on the walls near the north and south entrances of the original building. Commissioned as a WPA project, they were completed in 1938 by noted Santa Fe painter and designer William Penhallow Henderson, who is credited as a co-founder of the Santa Fe Art Colony and with popularizing the Pueblo Revival style of architecture.

A major restoration project undertaken by the U.S. General Services Administration (GSA) was completed in 2002. The roof and limestone decorative elements were cleaned and repaired. The large bronze doors at the main entrance, which had become blackened over the years, were thoroughly cleaned and polished, returning them to their former brilliance. Differential settlement of the sandstone exterior walls over many years had caused roof framing above Judge Campos' courtroom and offices to pull loose where attached to supporting walls. New steel framing within the attic space, hidden from view, was installed during this restoration to prevent eventual collapse of the roof that otherwise would eventually occur had the timber framing continued to pull apart. Repairs were made to the Kit Carson memorial to correct cracking in the sandstone. GSA was recognized for its stewardship of the U.S. Courthouse with a State of New Mexico Heritage Preservation Award in May, 2000. The completed project was recognized with a 2002 "Muchas Gracias" historic preservation award from the City of Santa Fe.

== Significant events ==
- 1853: Construction begins on the building.
- 1883: The building grounds are selected as the site for New Mexico's "Tertio-Millennial" celebration.
- 1884: A sandstone obelisk is erected as a memorial to Kit Carson, legendary soldier in the Grand Army of the Republic.
- 1889: Construction is completed.
- 1929-1930: An addition is constructed to the north of the original building.
- 1938: Six murals by William Penhallow Henderson, commissioned by the Public Works of Art Project and completed through the Treasury Relief Art Project, are installed near the north and south entrances.
- 1973: The building is listed in the National Register of Historic Places.
- 2002: Restoration work on the courthouse exterior and Kit Carson Memorial obelisk is completed.

== Building facts ==
- Architect: Ammi B. Young, Supervising Architect of the Treasury; Louis A. Simon, Superintendent of the Architectural Section of the Treasury Department
- Construction Dates: 1853-1889; two-story addition and connecting vestibule, 1929–1930
- Landmark Status: Listed in the National Register of Historic Places
- Location: East end of Federal Place
- Architectural Style: Greek Revival
- Primary Materials: Rubble stone and variegated limestone
- Prominent Features: Cantilevered marble stairway; Kit Carson Memorial obelisk; WPA Murals

== See also ==
- National Register of Historic Places listings in Santa Fe County, New Mexico
