= Datus Ensign Myers =

American artist

- Born: 1879; Jefferson, Oregon
- Died: 1960 (aged 80–81); Siskiyou County, California
- Education: Chouinard Institute of Art; Art Institute of Chicago
- Known for: murals
- Style: realism
- Spouse: Alice Clark Myers

Datus Ensign Myers (1879–1960) was a Santa Fe, New Mexico based artist.

== Early life and education ==
Myers was born September 29, 1879, in Jefferson, Oregon. He attended the Chouinard School of Art and the Chicago Art Institute.

== Work ==
Myers and his wife Alice Clark Myers moved to Santa Fe in 1923, settling in the Camino del Monte Sol area in 1925. Myers is known for his landscape paintings, and idealized representations of Indigenous life in the American West.

Myers became the Indian Division field coordinator for the New Deal's Public Works of Art Program in the 1930s. In this position, Myers would recruit Indigenous artists from the local Pueblos to participate in the WPA public art programs.

Myer's 1910 mural, Settlers and Indians was created for the Carl Von Linné Elementary School's main hallway. He was commissioned to paint a mural in 1939 in a New Deal program for murals in post offices; his work Logging in the Louisiana Swamps was painted for the post office built in 1936 by the WPA in Winnsboro, Louisiana, which has become a museum.

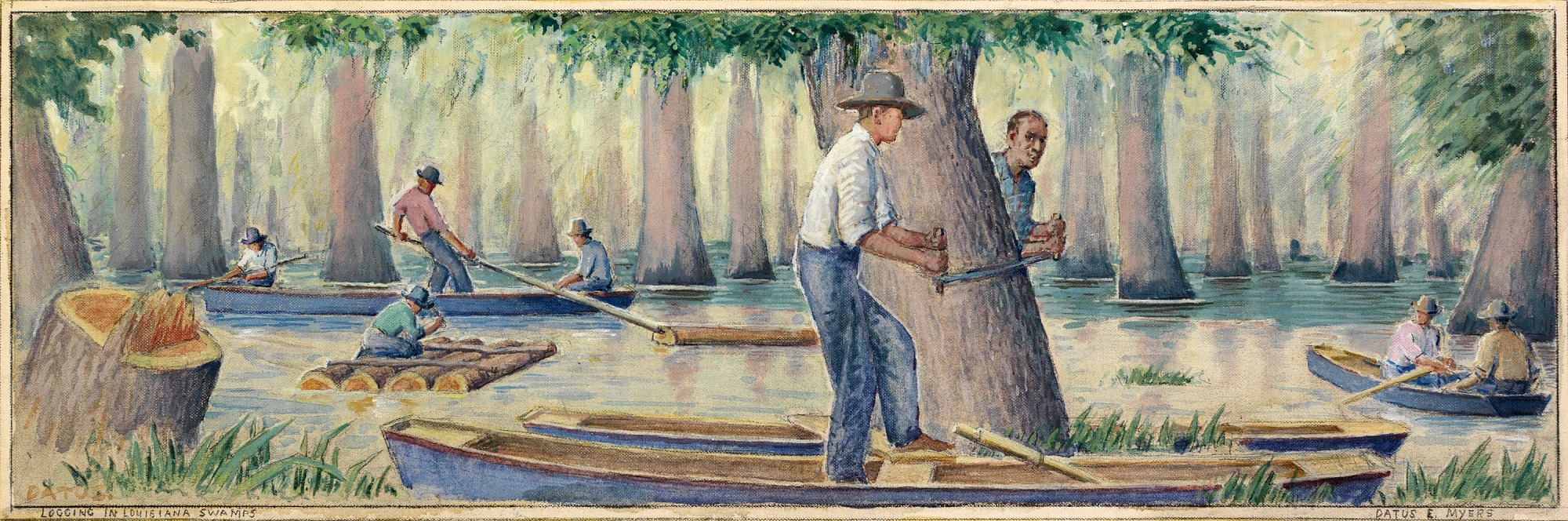
Logging in Louisiana Swamps (mural study, Winnsboro, Louisiana Post Office) SAAM-1974.28.35 1

== Personal life ==
Myers was married in 1910 to Alice Clark Myers, an architect. He died in 1960 in Siskiyou County, California.
