= Alfred Morang =

American painter

Alfred G. Morang
- Born: June 13, 1901; Ellsworth, Maine
- Died: January 29, 1958 (aged 56); Santa Fe, New Mexico
- Known for: painting, writing
- Style: nonobjective, impressionist
- Movement: Transcendental Painting Group
- Spouse: Dorothy Morang

Alfred Gwynne Morang (1901–1958) was an American painter, writer, art critic and active member of the Santa Fe art colony.

Alfred Morang was born in Ellsworth, Maine in 1901. His early education was in violin playing, writing and painting. He met Dorothy Alden Clark in Boston and they married in 1930. Morang credited his friend, author Erskine Caldwell, with encouraging him to publish his writing.

The Morangs moved to New Mexico in 1937 upon a doctor's recommendation that Alfred needed a higher, drier climate. In Santa Fe he became an influential figure through his writing and teaching on art. Notable publications include the 1940 booklet Transcendental Painting about the Transcendental Painting Group, a weekly newspaper column on art, and the 1947 book Adventure in Drawing. Morang also had a popular radio program in Santa Fe called "The World of Art."

In 1950 Alfred and Dorothy Morang divorced. A fire in his home/studio in January 1958 ended his life and his remains were cremated.

His home in Santa Fe, at 1 Placita Rafaela, is listed on the National Register of Historic Places as a contributing building in the Camino del Monte Sol Historic District. Some of his artworks are permanently located in the El Farol restaurant on Canyon Road in Santa Fe, New Mexico.
