= Walter Mruk =

American artist

- Wladyslaw Mruk
- Born: 1883; Buffalo, New York
- Died: 1942 (aged 58–59)
- Education: Albright Art Institute
- Known for: Landscape painting, Cavern paintings
- Notable work: Carlsbad Cavern (Denver Art Museum)
- Style: Modernism, Fantastic art
- Movement: Los Cinco Pintores

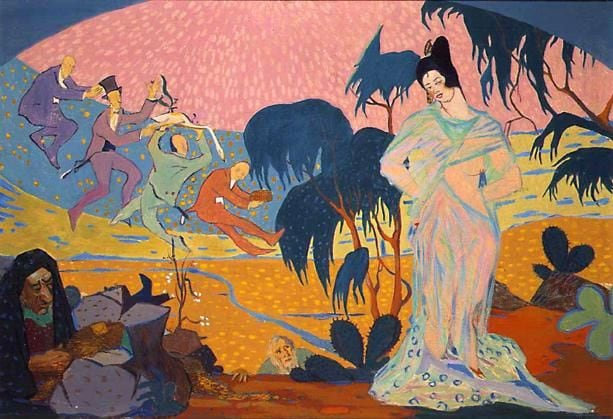
Walter Mruk, "Homage to Mabel Dodge", oil on canvas, 1919

Walter Mruk (1883–1942) was an American painter who was a member of Los Cinco Pintores a group of artists who worked in Santa Fe, New Mexico in the early twentieth century.

Mruk was born Wladyslaw Mruk in Buffalo, New York to parents of Polish descent. He studied at the Albright Art Institute. By 1920 he had relocated to Santa Fe, where he worked as a forest ranger, and also as a cartoonist for the Santa Fe New Mexican newspaper.

In 1924–1925, Mruk and fellow painter, Will Shuster travelled to Carlsbad Caverns on a painting adventure before the cave system was established as a national park. They painted in the caverns using lantern light. Mruk's work from this series was described in 1925 in the magazine, El Palacio:

Mruk's canvases are said to be imaginative to a high degree. He filled the cavern with mythical grotesques in an effort to interpret his reaction upon entering the dim lit interior. The work is accepted as a distinct achievement, although decidedly unusual, and difficult of treatment.

One of Mruk's paintings from this series is housed in Denver Art Museum.

== Collections ==
His work is held in the collections of the Denver Art Museum, the Roswell Museum, the New Mexico Museum of Art, among other venues.

== See also ==
- Santa Fe art colony
- Taos Society of Artists
