= Cross of the Martyrs =

Memorials in Santa Fe, New Mexico

Cruz de los Mártires
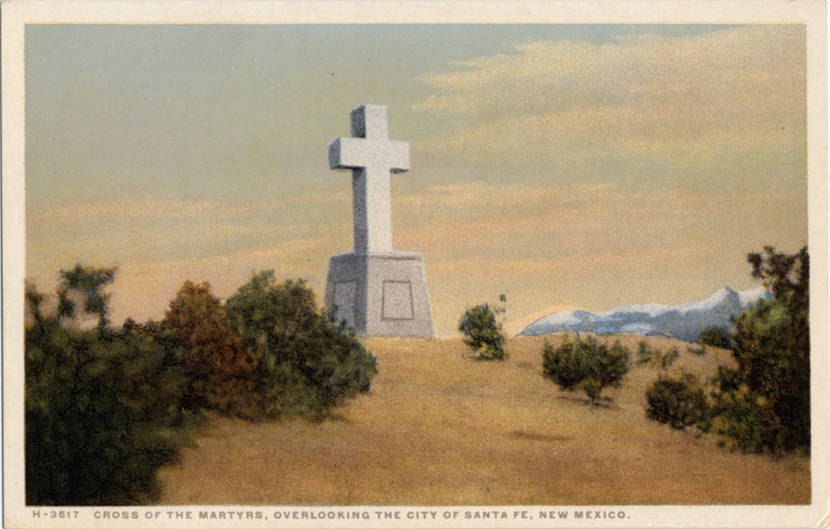
- Interactive map of Cruz de los Mártires
- Coordinates: 35°41.726′N 105°56.346′W
- Length: 8 feet (2.4 m)
- Height: 25 feet (7.6 m)
- Weight: 76 short tons (69 t)

The Cross of the Martyrs refers to either of two cross-shaped monuments erected in the 20th century in Santa Fe, New Mexico, commemorating the deaths of 21 Catholic clergy during the Pueblo Revolt (the named 'martyrs'). The earlier of the two was near the Old Taos Highway and La Cruz Road, which is named after the memorial. The Midland Bridge Company made this cross for the designers Ralph Emerson Twitchell, Edgar L. Street, and Warren G. Turley, using reinforced concrete. The cross was dedicated during the 1920 Fiestas de Santa Fe. The Historic Santa Fe Foundation and the Fiesta Council commissioned a second Cross of the Martyrs in 1994, made of steel, near Fort Marcy.

== History ==
The original Cross of the Martyrs was erected in 1920 for the Fiestas de Santa Fe. It was built on land belonging to the Orthodox Catholic Mission Parish of St. Joseph. It was then purchased from the Parish by the Near North Neighborhood before being sold to the Historic Santa Fe Foundation in 1993, with a new information sign erected a year later, with information in English and Spanish. In 2020, due to George Floyd protests, the Foundation considered making amendments to the Cross. They opted to leave the existing plaques on the cross in place but put a sign with a QR code up to feature modern opinions on the memorial.

A new Cross of the Martyrs was erected in the park in Fort Marcy in 1994. In 2021, it was subject to two bouts of vandalism. The first had one of the brass plaques around it stolen. The second featured graffiti sprayed on it.

== Gallery ==
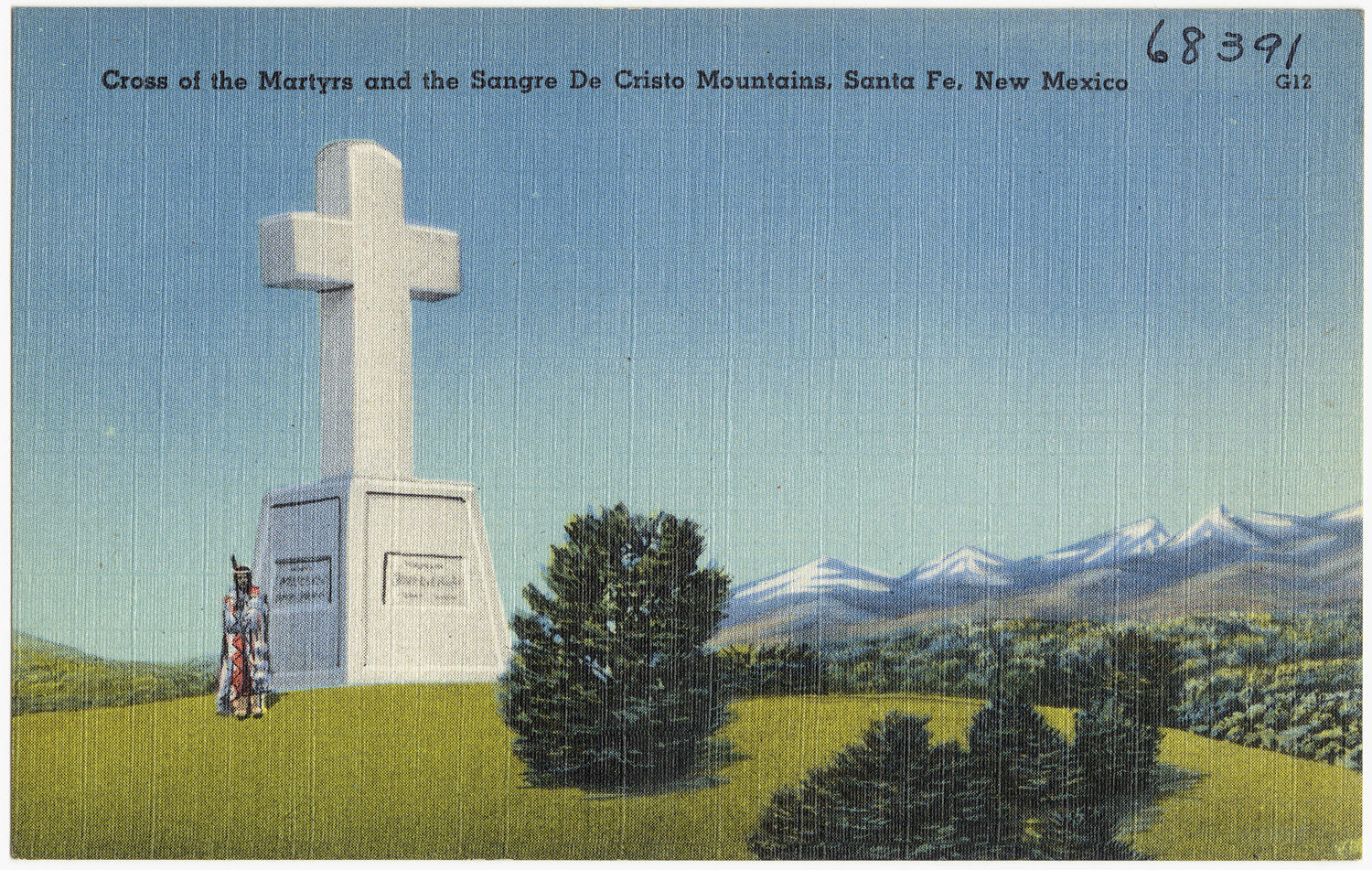
older Cross

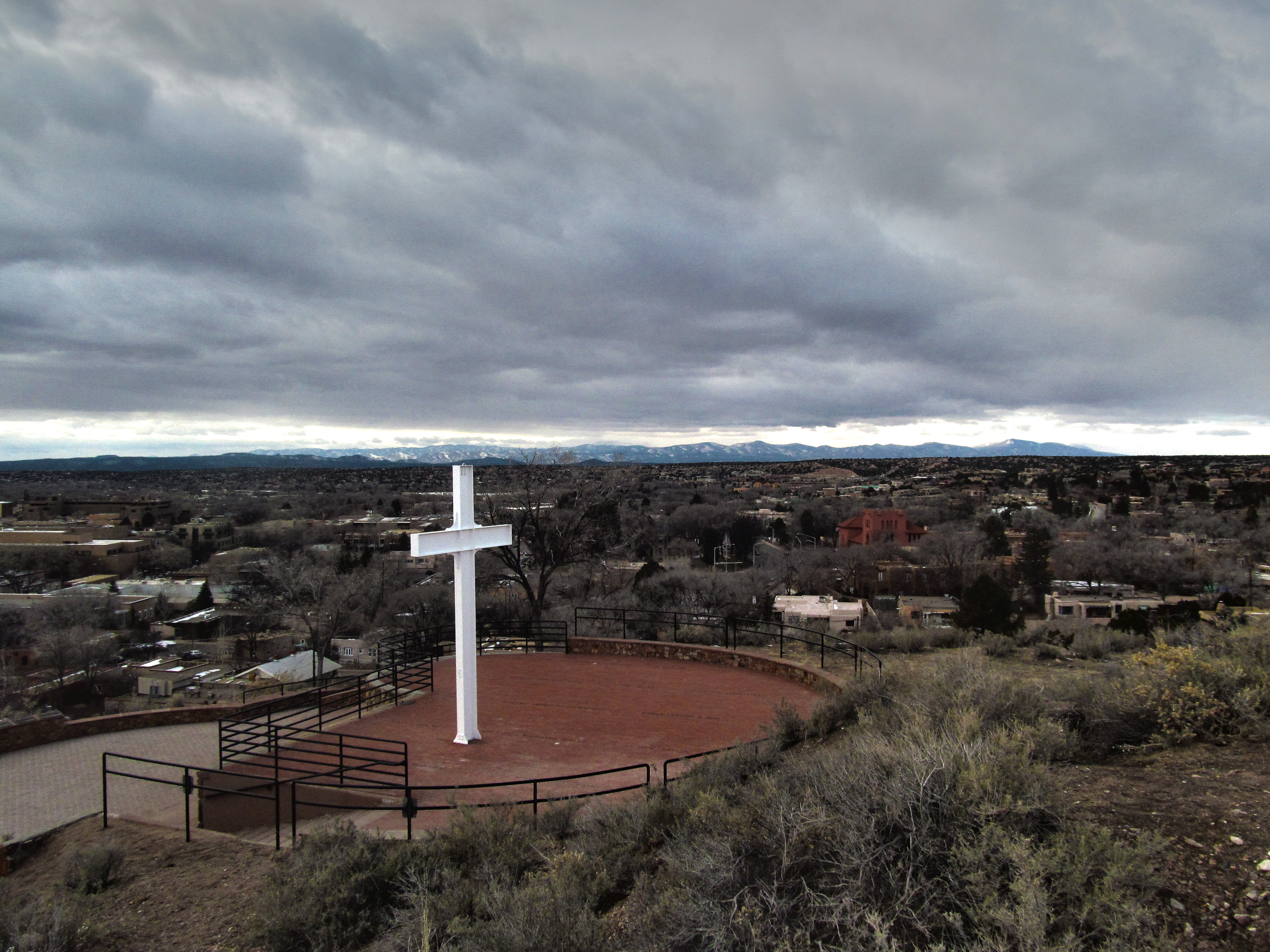
newer Cross

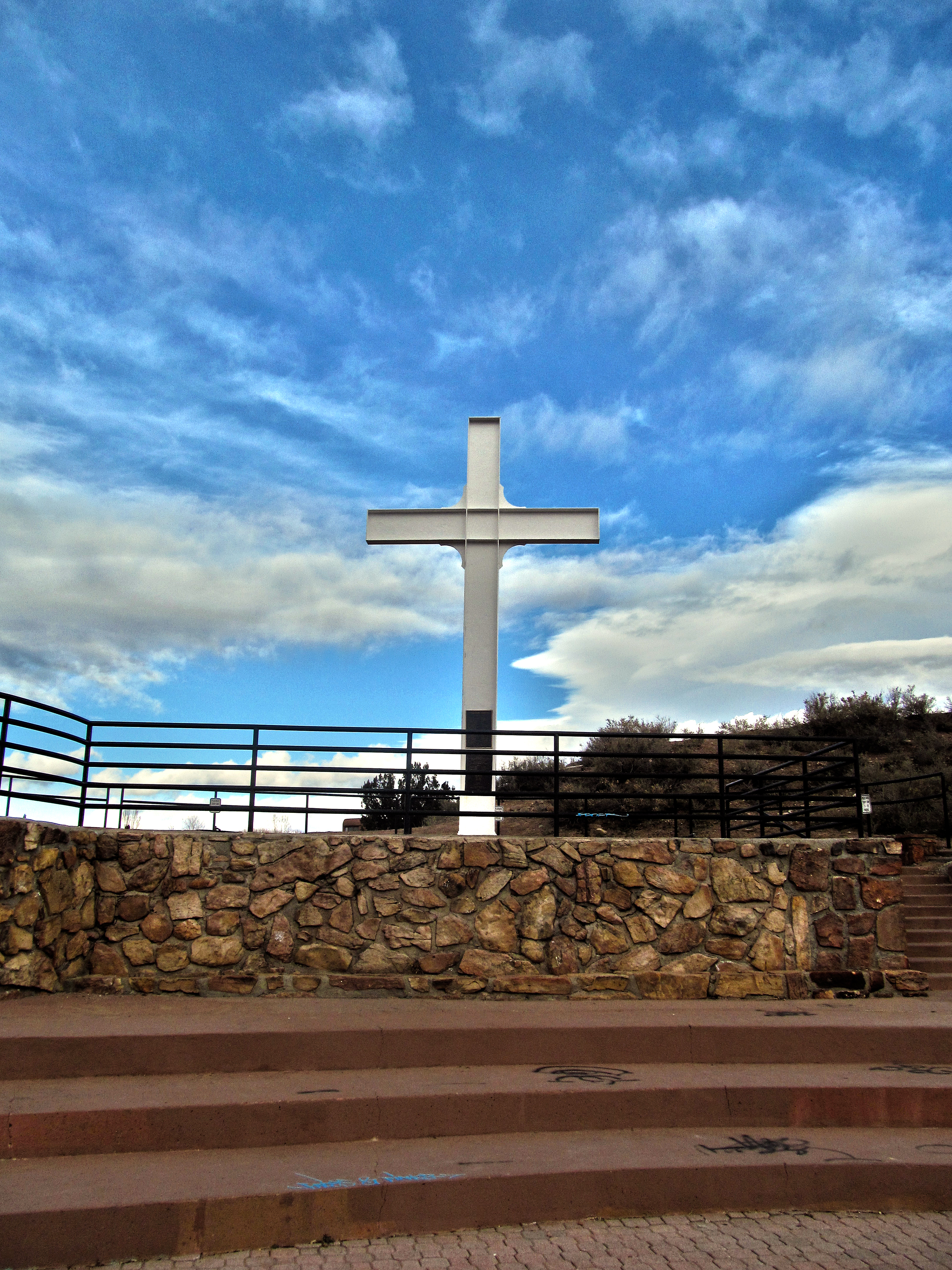
newer Cross
