= Jozef Bakos =

American painter (1891–1977)

- Born: September 23, 1891; Buffalo, New York, U.S.
- Died: April 25, 1977 (aged 85); Santa Fe, New Mexico, U.S.
- Resting place: Rosario Cemetery (Santa Fe, NM)
- Other names: Joseph Bakos, Joseph G. Bakos
- Education: John E. Thompson
- Alma mater: Albright–Knox Art Gallery
- Known for: Painting
- Style: Modernism
- Movement: Los Cinco Pintores
- Spouse: Teresa Bakos

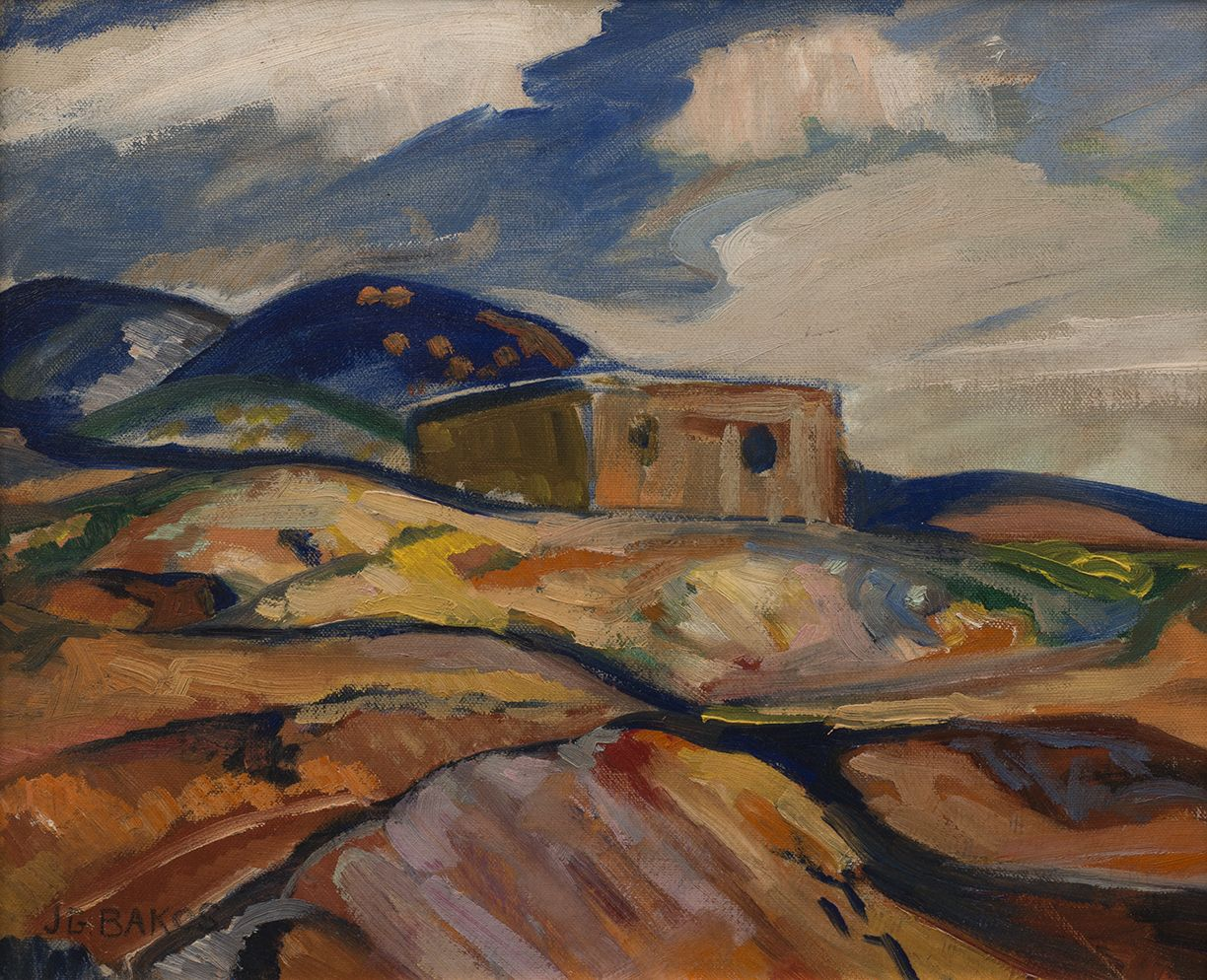
Santa Fe Adobe (ca. 1919)

Jozef G. Bakos (1891–1977), known as Joseph Bakos, was an American Modernist painter. He was a pioneering force in early 20th-century Southwestern art and founding member of Los Cinco Pintores, Santa Fe's first major Modernist artist collective. He is celebrated for his depictions of the American Southwest and a key figure in Southwestern art.

== Life ==
Born in Buffalo, New York, Bakos was the eldest of seven children in a Polish immigrant family. He studied at the Albright Art School (later Albright-Knox) from 1912 to 1917, earning top honors including the Joseph Albright Medal. He apprenticed under Joesph E. Thompson, whose work from Europe, especially influences from Cezanne, shaped Bakos's early aesthetic.

In 1918, Bakos moved to Denver with Thompson and fellow Buffalo artist Walter Mruk. Their avant-garde paintings, often compared to Bolshevik propaganda, shocked local audiences. He briefly served as the first art instructor at the University of Colorado, Boulder. When an influenza epidemic led to closures at the University of Colorado in 1920, Bakos traveled to Santa Fe, New Mexico to visit Mruk, exhibiting at the local Museum of Fine Arts and falling in love with the regions landscape.

Bakos died in Santa Fe on April 25, 1977, and is buried in Rosario Cemetery in Santa Fe. In 1985, the Burchfield Penney Art Center in Buffalo honored him with a retrospective exhibition. His home in Santa Fe, at 576 Camino del Monte Sol, is listed on the National Register of Historic Places as a contributing building in the Camino del Monte Sol Historic District.

== Artistic Style & Evolution ==
Bakos's early work was characterized by expressive, emotionally charged brushstrokes influenced by Van Gogh and German Expressionists. By the mid-1920s his style adopted more structural and Cubist influences, with clear forms, simplified shapes and strong color blocks.

In 1921, Bakos, Mruk, Fremont Ellis, Will Shuster and Willard Nash founded Los Cinco Pintores. Their manifesto published in El Palacio, proclaimed a mission to "bring art to the people," showcasing works in schools, factories, hospitals and even prisons. They built adjoining adobe studios along Camino del Monte Sol, forming Santa Fe's first modernist art colony. The group was active in exhibitions in Sante Fe (1921), touring the Midwest (1922), and Los Angeles (1923) before formally disbanding in 1926. As part of Los Cinco Pintores, Bakos helped introduce European Modernism to the American Southwest, breaking away from impressionistic norms of the day.

His work centers on New Mexico's landscape, Pueblo ceremonies, adobe architecture, still-lifes (particularly florals) and occasionally figurative work and self-portraits. He elevated Southwestern life through a fresh, modern, expressive and abstracted lens that fused form with context.

His work can be found in the collections of the Whitney Museum of American Art, Denver Art Museum, Phoenix Art Museum, Brooklyn Museum of Art, Phoenix Art Museum, Stark Museum of Art and New Mexico Museum of Art.
