= Wheelwright Museum of the American Indian =

- U.S. National Register of Historic Places
- NM State Register of Cultural Properties
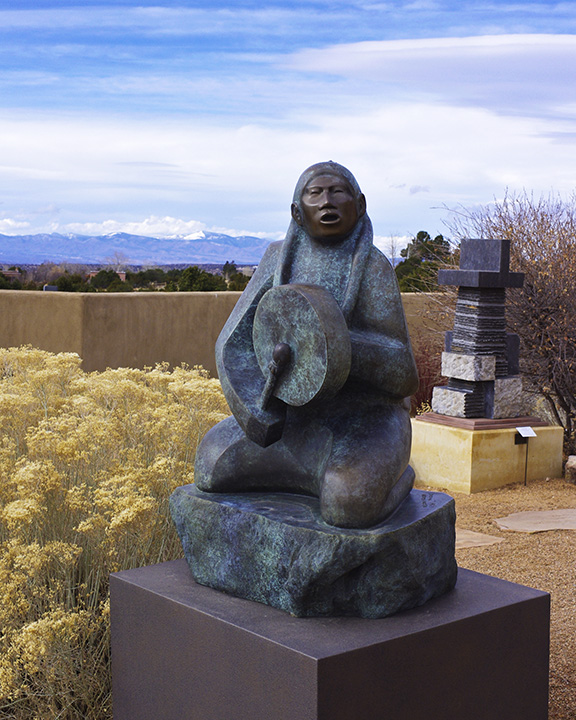
- Drumming Up The Mountain Spirits

- Location within New Mexico Location within the United States
- Location: 704 Camino Lejo, Santa Fe, New Mexico
- Coordinates: 35°39′45″N 105°55′38″W
- Area: less than one acre
- Architect: William Penhallow Henderson
- Architectural style: Navajo Ceremonial hooghan
- NRHP reference No.: 90001917
- NMSRCP No.: 1533

Significant dates
- Added to NRHP: December 18, 1990
- Designated NMSRCP: October 5, 1990

The Wheelwright Museum of the American Indian is a museum devoted to Native American arts. It is located in Santa Fe, New Mexico and was founded in 1937 by Mary Cabot Wheelwright, who came from Boston, and Hastiin Klah, a Navajo singer and medicine man.

== History ==
Wheelwright and Klah were introduced in 1921 and quickly became close friends. It was not long before they determined to create a permanent record of Klah's and other singers’ ritual knowledge. Klah dictated and Wheelwright recorded the Navajo Creation Story and other great narratives that form the basis of Navajo religion. While Wheelwright concentrated on the spoken word in Navajo ritual, Frances (“Franc”) Newcomb focused on the sandpaintings that are created and destroyed during healing ceremonies, recreating versions of them in tempera on paper. Klah participated in yet another way: he was a weaver, and his huge tapestries were also permanent records of sandpaintings.

By the early 1930s, it was clear to Wheelwright and Klah that a museum would be necessary to realize their goals. It could not be simply a repository for the sound recordings, manuscripts, paintings, and sandpainting tapestries. It had to offer the public an opportunity to sense the beauty, dignity, and profound logic of Navajo religion. Their chosen architect, William Penhallow Henderson, based his design on the hooghan (the hogan), the traditional Navajo home and the setting for Navajo ceremonies. Klah blessed the ground on which the museum is built but died a few months before it was completed. A traditional Navajo house blessing was conducted by the singer Big Man in November 1937, and many of Klah's relatives attended. The museum's earliest names were the Navajo House of Prayer and the House of Navajo Religion, but, soon after it opened to the public, its name officially became the Museum of Navajo Ceremonial Art.

In the 1960s and 1970s, the Navajo Nation exerted its independence through a number of sweeping changes, including the establishment of its own community college system. Also at that time Navajo singers founded the Navajo Medicine Men's Association. The teachings of traditional Navajo religion enjoyed a revival, and its practitioners began to express their concerns about the teaching of Navajo religion by anyone other than Navajos. In 1977 the museum therefore repatriated several Navajo medicine bundles and other items to the Navajo people.

With the repatriation of 1977, the museum changed its name to the Wheelwright Museum of the American Indian. Although it is no longer actively involved in the study of Navajo religion, it maintains growing, world-renowned collections that document Navajo art and culture from 1850 to the present. It also presents changing exhibitions on traditional and contemporary Navajo and other Native American arts.

== See also ==
- National Register of Historic Places listings in Santa Fe County, New Mexico
- Navajo Nation Museum
