= Will Shuster =

American painter, sculptor and teacher (1893–1969)

- Born: William Howard Shuster Jr. November 26, 1893; Philadelphia, Pennsylvania, U.S.
- Died: February 9, 1969 (aged 75); Albuquerque, New Mexico, U.S.
- Resting place: Santa Fe National Cemetery; Santa Fe, New Mexico, U.S.
- Education: John Sloan
- Alma mater: Drexel Institute
- Known for: Painting
- Notable work: Zozobra
- Movement: Los Cinco Pintores

William Howard Shuster Jr. (1893–1969) was an American painter, sculptor and teacher.

== Philadelphia ==
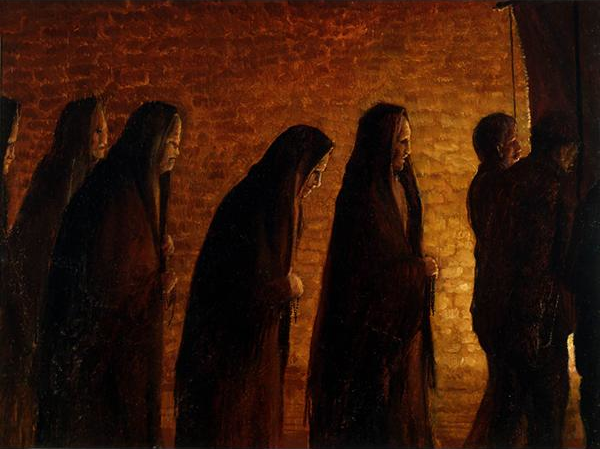
The Eve of Saint Francis, 1922

Shuster was born November 26, 1893, in Philadelphia, Pennsylvania, the second of three children.

He studied engineering at the Drexel Institute of Art, Science and Industry in Philadelphia

He served in the U.S. Army in France during World War I, where he was gassed by the German Army. Shuster developed tuberculosis, which weakened his lungs. He would receive a disability pension thereafter.

Shuster's cousin, Dr. William Crowley, visited him at a military hospital, reviewed his medical records, and informed him that he had tuberculosis:

Shuster (quoting his cousin): "Oh, you can stick around here [Philadelphia] for a year. You'll probably last a year. Or, you can go up to Saranac Lake [Tuberculosis Sanitorium] or White Haven [Tuberculosis Sanitorium], or one of those places and you'll last a couple of years longer."

"But if I were you I would pack up and get out to the Southwest to some high dry place as soon as possible. I want you to be in bed 12 hours a day. It doesn't mean you have to go to bed at 8 and get up at 8, but stay 12 hours a day. Sleep outdoors as much as possible. Eat plenty of nourishing food, go on with your painting. Don't treat yourself as an invalid. You'll probably die of old age, snake bite or drinking too damn much bad whiskey."

Shuster: "Within a couple weeks, I was here [in New Mexico]."

== New Mexico ==
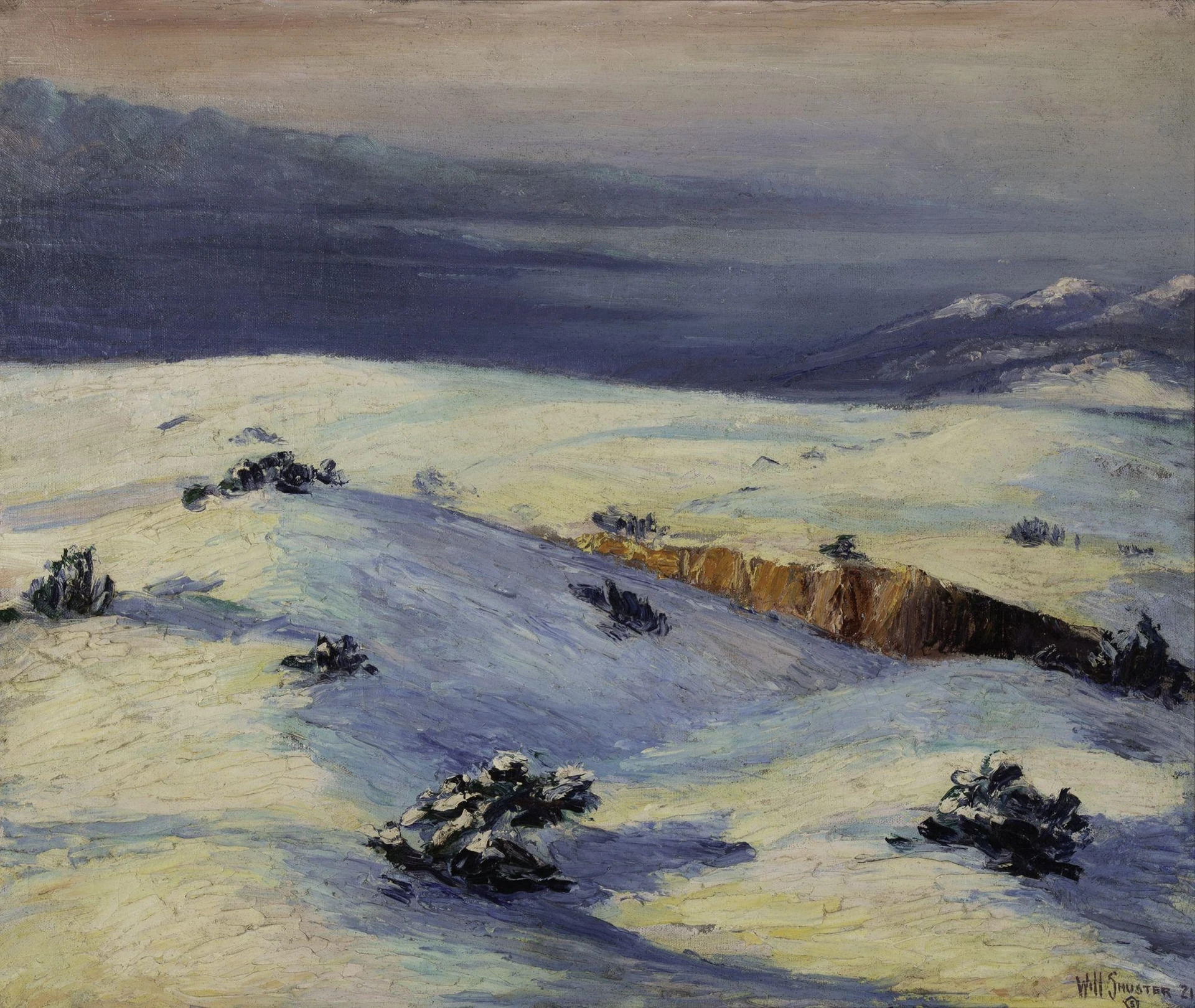
New Mexico Snow Country, 1921

In 1920, Shuster moved to New Mexico to improve his health.

He became friends with the small but growing arts community. Shuster made money doing ironwork and painting to supplement the pension. In 1921, he became a member of Los Cinco Pintores ("the five painters"), and showed throughout Santa Fe and the rest of the country with the group.

In 1924, he founded the ongoing tradition of burning the Zozobra, a giant puppet of "Old Man Gloom" made of wood, cloth and papier mache, on the Friday night of Labor Day weekend.

In 1938, Shuster married Selma Paddock Dingee-Schaumann (1900-1987), a divorcee with two children: Don Byron Schaumann (1921-1989), who later adopted "Shuster" as his surname; and Linda Schaumann (1931-2015). Will and Selma Shuster had two sons together, John Adam Shuster (1939-1989) and Stephen Shuster (1942, died in infancy).

== Oeuvre ==
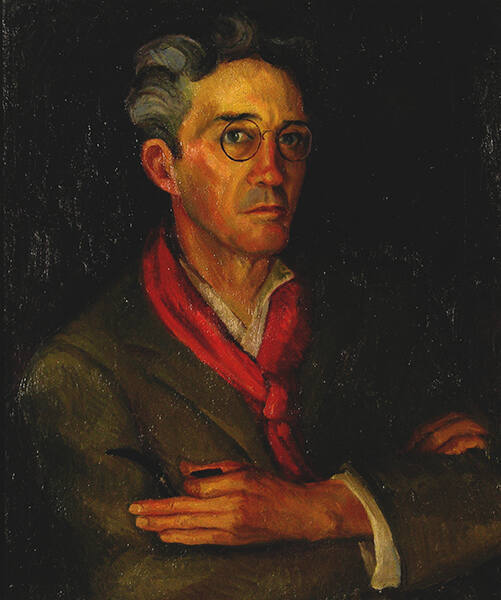
Portrait of John Sloan, 1928

His artwork is in the permanent collections of the Stark Museum of Art in Orange, Texas, Brooklyn Museum, Delaware Art Museum, Newark Museum, and New Mexico Museum of Art.

- undated — Senator Bronson Cutting (bronze bust)
- undated — Avanyu 1
- undated — Avanyu 2
- undated — Prayer for the Hunt
- undated — Portrait of Teresa Bakos
- undated — 40th Wedding Anniversary
- 1921 — New Mexico Snow Country
- October 1922 — The Eve of Saint Francis
- 1924 — Zozobra, a giant puppet now burned every year in effigy, and symbolizing the gloom of the passing year.
- 1927 — New Mexico Mountain Scene
- 1928 — Portrait of John Sloan
- 1929 —The Santo Domingo - Corn Dance
- c. 1930 — Trees at Canyoncito
- c. 1934 — Eagle Dancer (study for The Voice of the Sky)
- 1934 — Winnowing Wheat
- May 28 - August 8, 1934 — The Voice of the Earth (The Basket Dance)
- 1934 — Pottery Maker
- May 28 - August 28, 1934 — The Voice of the Water (The Spring Flute Ceremony)
- 1934 — Sermon at Cross of the Martyrs
- 1935 — The Voice of Sipapu (The Kiva)
- c. 1940 — Sketchbook
- September 14 - October 12, 1943 — The Voice of the Sky (The Eagle Dance)
- 1949 — Untitled (Deer Dance)
- 1952 — El Toro, a symbol for the Santa Fe Rodeo.
- 1964 — Zozobra Mural
