= Los Cinco Pintores =

20th-century artist group in Santa Fe, New Mexico

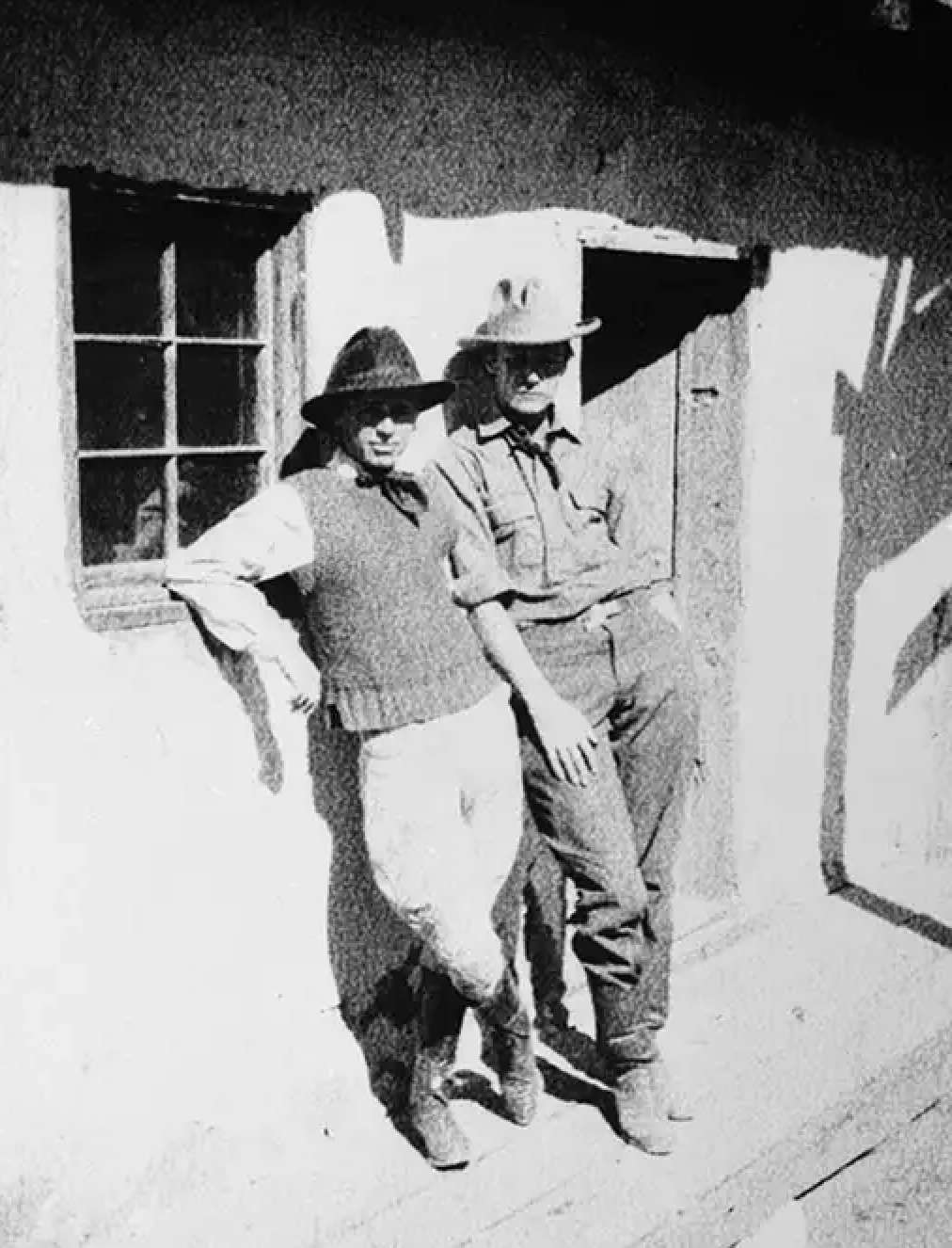

Los Cinco Pintores ("The Five Painters") was a group of early 20th-century artists in Santa Fe, New Mexico that included Will Shuster, Fremont Ellis, Walter Mruk, Jozef Bakos, and Willard Nash.

By 1921, Shuster, Ellis, Mruk, Bakos, and Nash had all moved to Santa Fe, and the five formed their artist collective in 1921. At the time, the five painters were all in their 20s and new to Santa Fe. Their stated goal was to "take art to the people" by exhibiting in places such as schools, hospitals, factories, and even the New Mexico Penitentiary.

In December of that year, the New Mexico Museum of Art presented the first of several exhibitions as a group. In addition to their Midwestern Touring Exhibit in 1922, they also arranged a show in Los Angeles in 1923 call "Exhibition of Painting by Artists of New Mexico".

These modernist painters were inspired by New Mexican people and landscapes for their subject matter. They formally disbanded in 1926.

== See also ==
- Taos Society of Artists
