= Santa Fe art colony =

Art colony

The Santa Fe art colony was an art colony in Santa Fe, New Mexico, United States, which developed in the early 1900s.

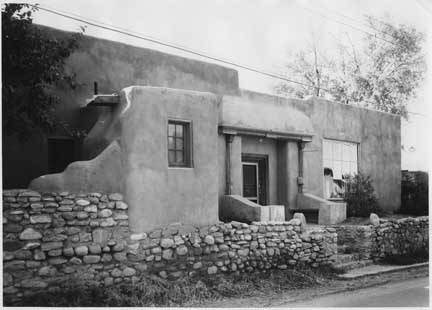
Artist Gerald Cassidy's home in Santa Fe, circa 1937. Cassidy was a founding member of the Santa Fe art colony in the early 20th century.

The active time frame of the colony was between about 1910 and the second World War.

The Camino del Monte Sol Historic District, including a large portion of the art colony, was listed on the National Register of Historic Places in 1988.

In 2019, there remains a considerable number of art museums and art galleries in and around the city.

== See also ==
- Taos art colony
