= New Mexico Museum of Art =

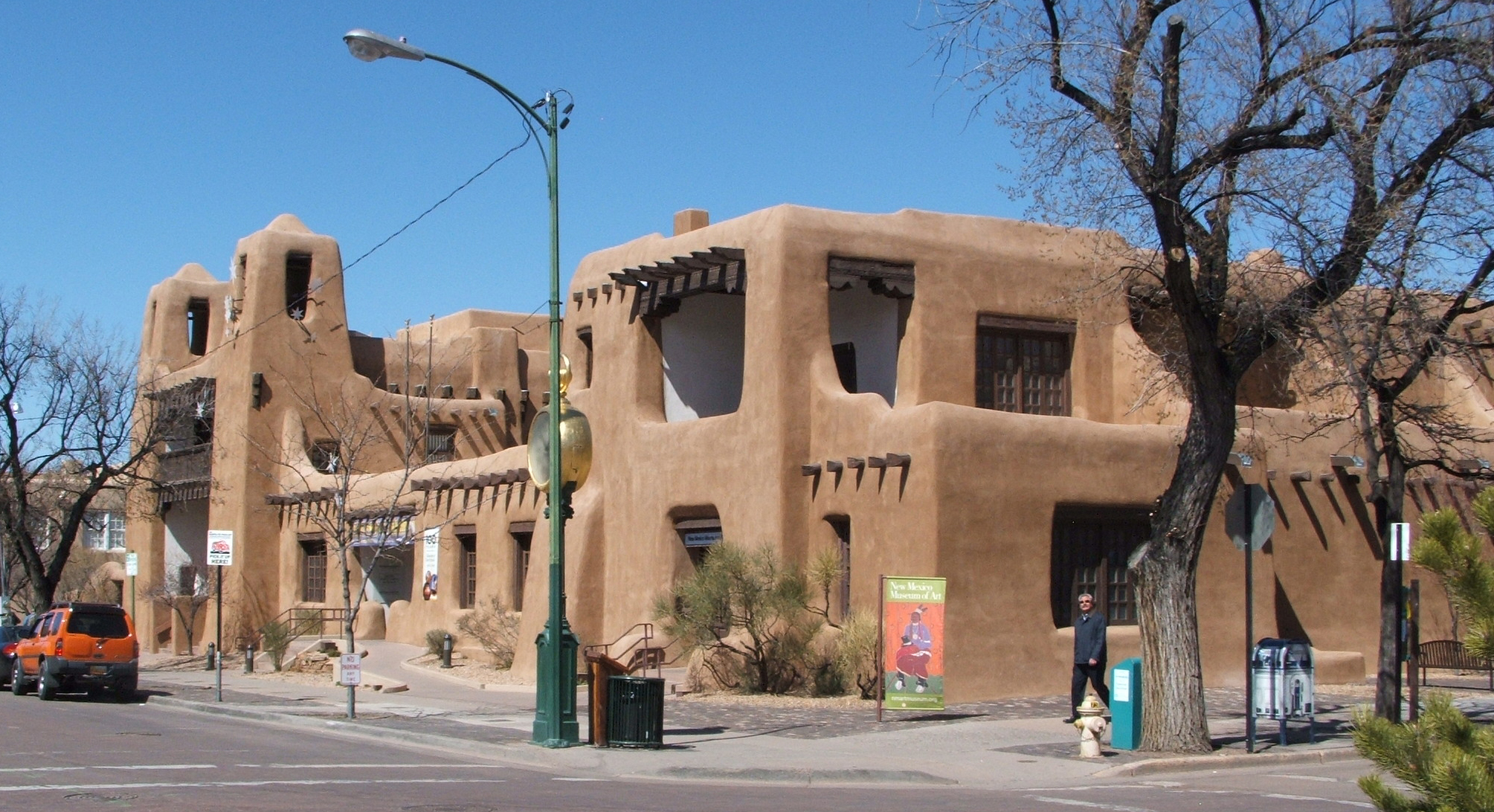
- Former name: Museum of New Mexico Art Gallery
- Established: 1917
- Location: 107 West Palace Avenue; Santa Fe, New Mexico, U.S.
- Coordinates: 35.6881°N 105.9392°W
- Type: Art museum
- Architect: Isaac Rapp
- Website: nmartmuseum.org

The New Mexico Museum of Art is an art museum in Santa Fe governed by the state of New Mexico, United States. It is one of four state-run museums in Santa Fe that are part of the Museum of New Mexico. It is located one block off the historic Santa Fe Plaza. It was given its current name in 2007, having previously been referred to as The Museum of Fine Arts.

== History ==
The building was designed by architect Isaac Rapp and completed in 1917. It is an example of Pueblo Revival Style architecture, and one of Santa Fe's best-known representations of the synthesis of Native American and Spanish Colonial design styles. The façade was based on the mission churches of Acoma, San Felipe, Cochiti, Laguna, Santa Ana and Pecos.

In September 2023, the museum opened Vladem Contemporary in the Railyard district as a dedicated venue for contemporary art.

== Collections ==
The museum’s art collection includes over 20,000 paintings, photographs, sculptures, prints, drawings and mixed-media works. Notable artists in the collection include Ansel Adams, Gustave Baumann, Brian O'Connor, Georgia O'Keeffe, Fritz Scholder, T. C. Cannon, Bruce Nauman, Luis Jimenez, Maria Martinez, members of the Ashcan School, Los Cinco Pintores, Transcendental Painting Group, and the Taos Society of Artists.

=== Paintings ===
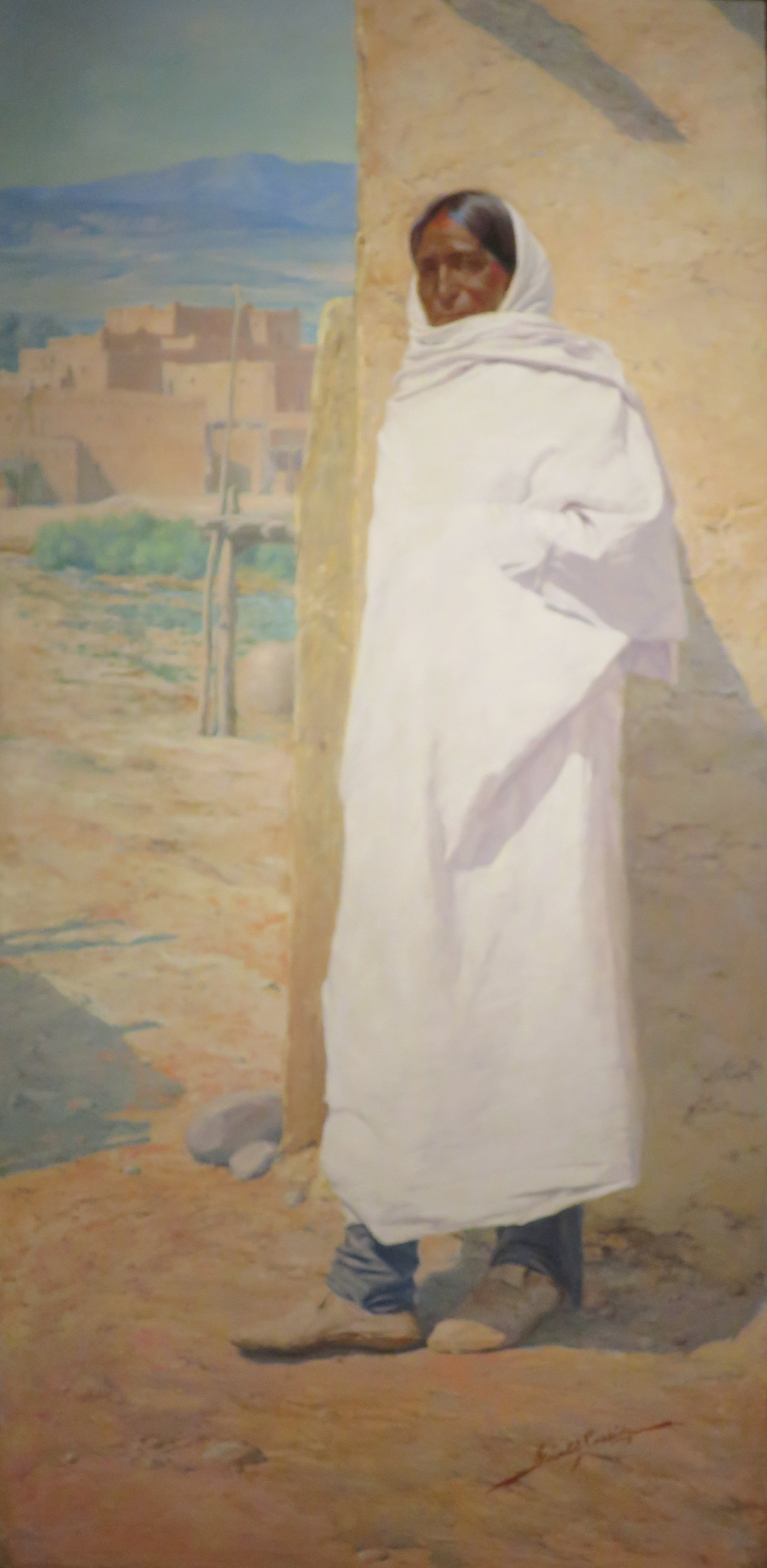
Gerald Cassidy, Cui Bono, c. 1911

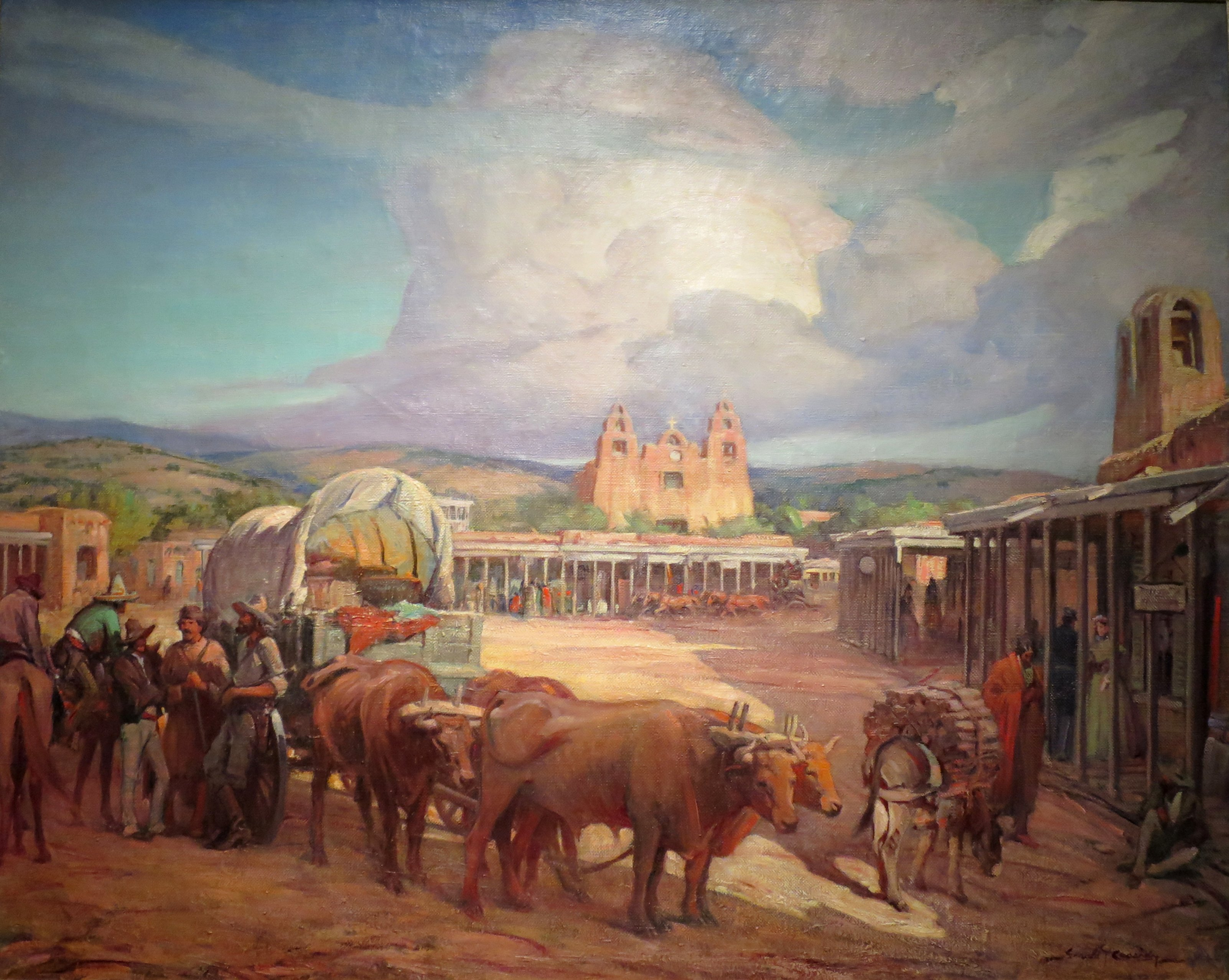
Gerald Cassidy, View of Santa Fe Plaza in the 1850s, c. 1930

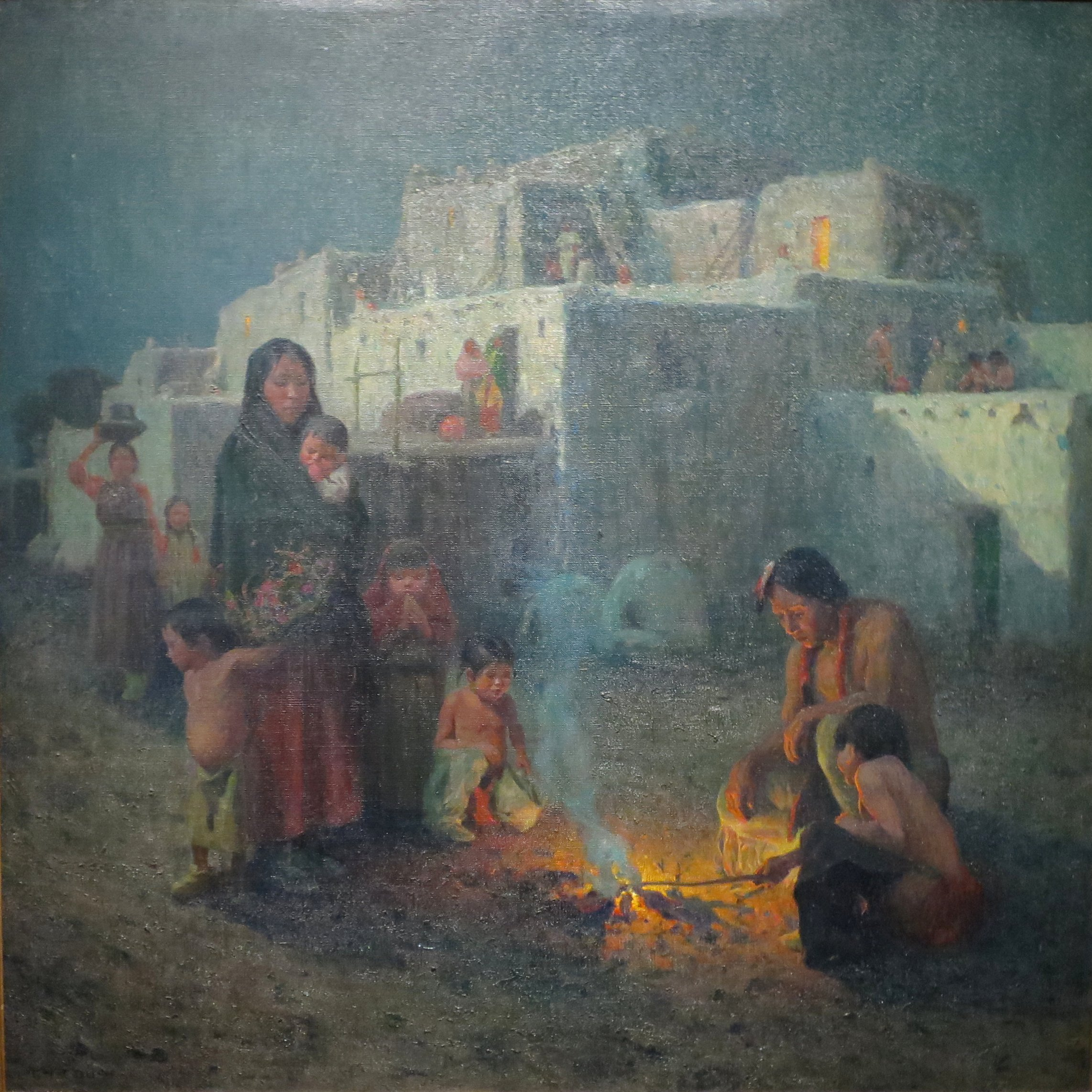
Eanger Irving Couse, Taos Pueblo—Moonlight, 1914

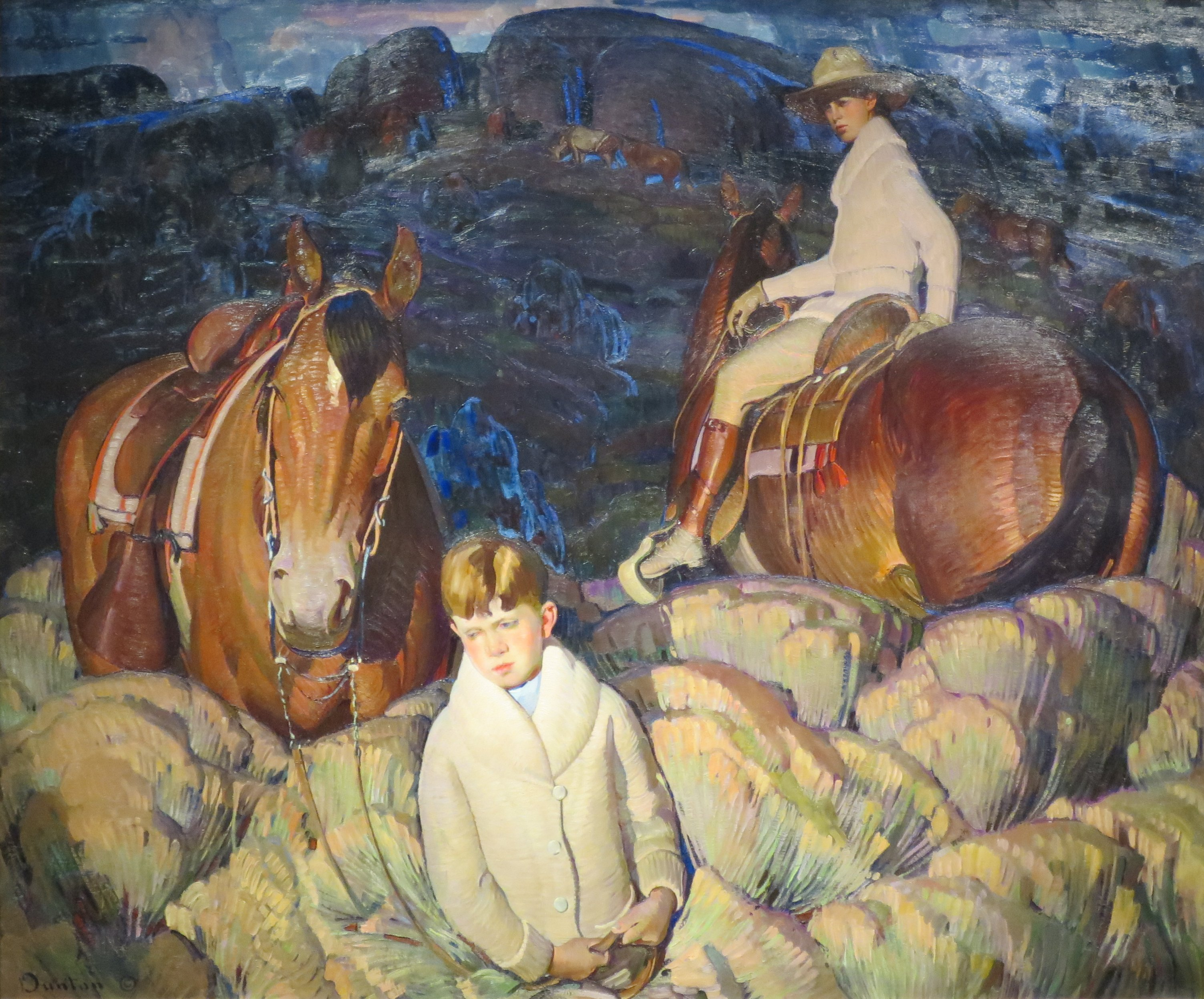
William Herbert Dunton, My Children, 1920

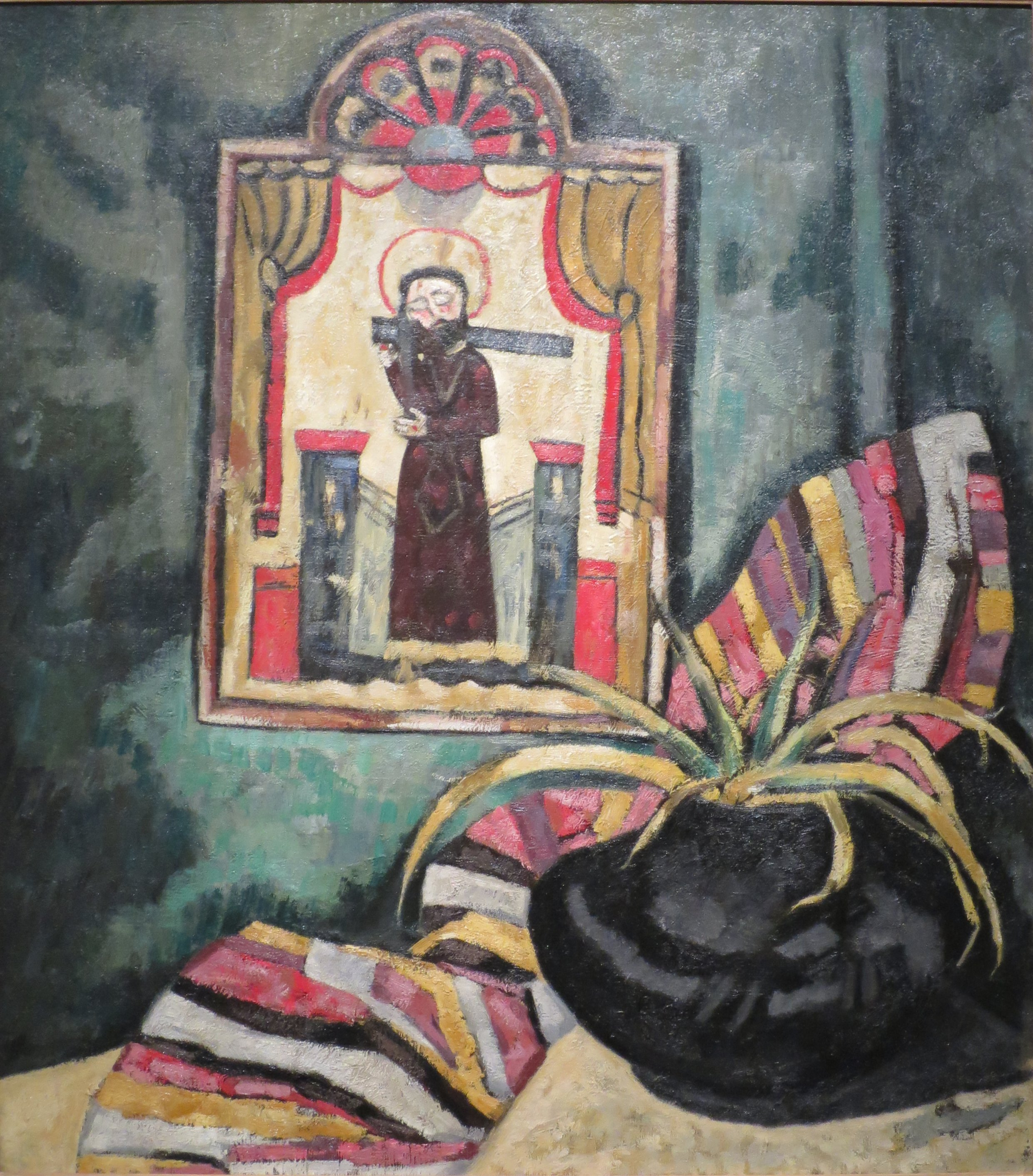
Marsden Hartley, El Santo, c. 1919

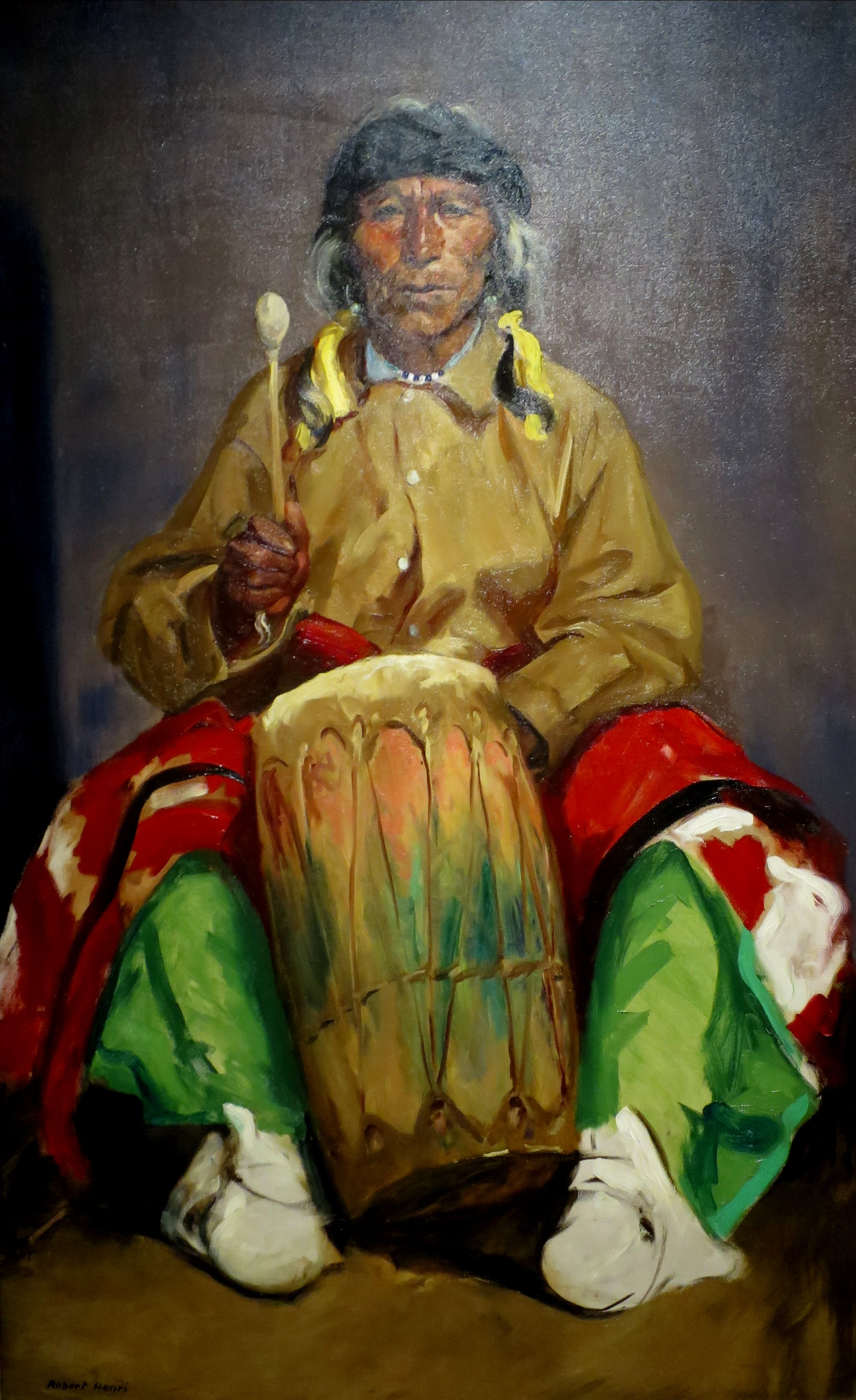
Robert Henri, Portrait of Dieguito Roybal, San Ildefonso Pueblo, 1916

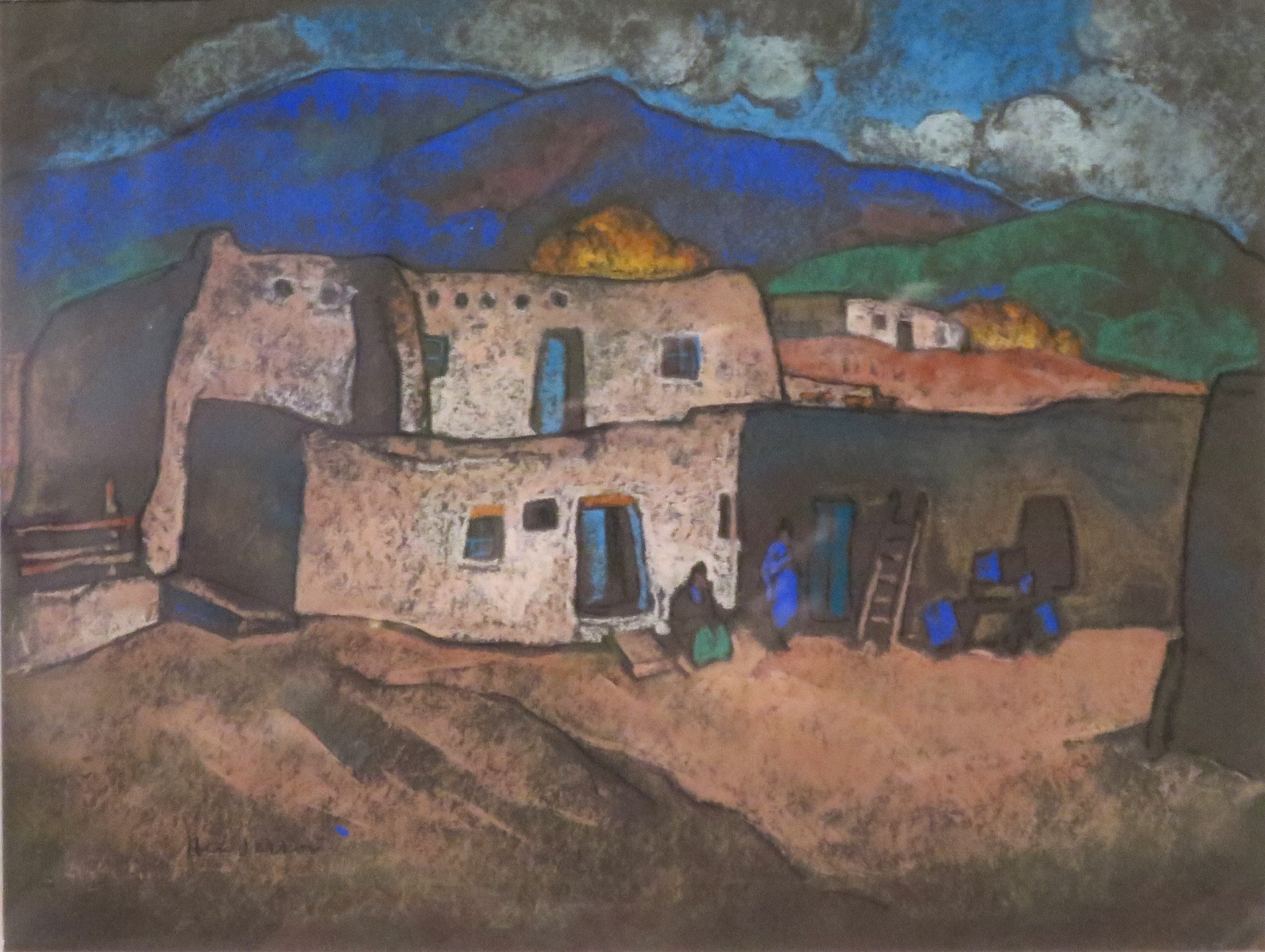
William Penhallow Henderson, Pueblo Adobes, c. 1918

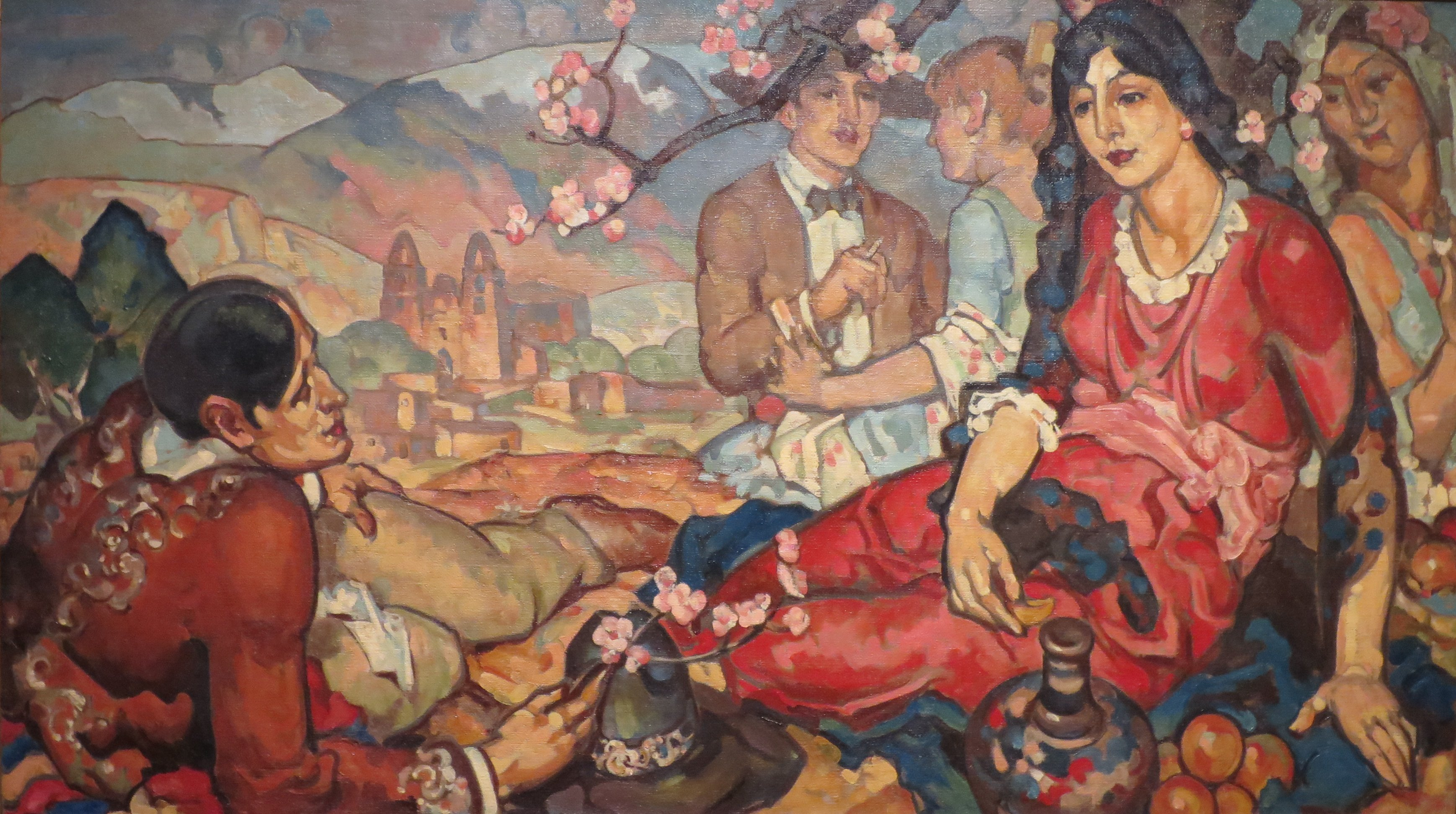
William Penhallow Henderson, Noon, 1920

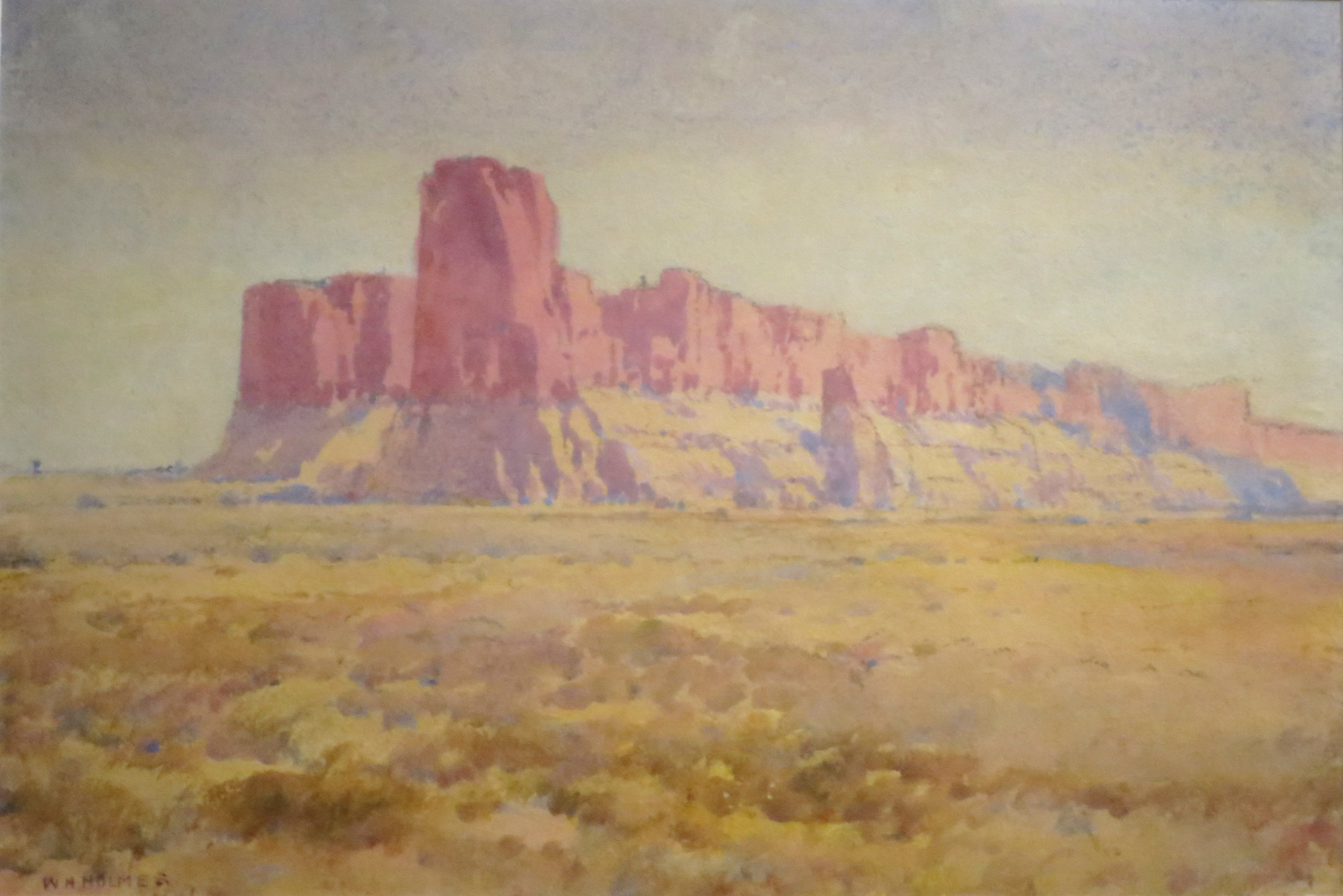
William Henry Holmes, Mesa Encantada, 1914

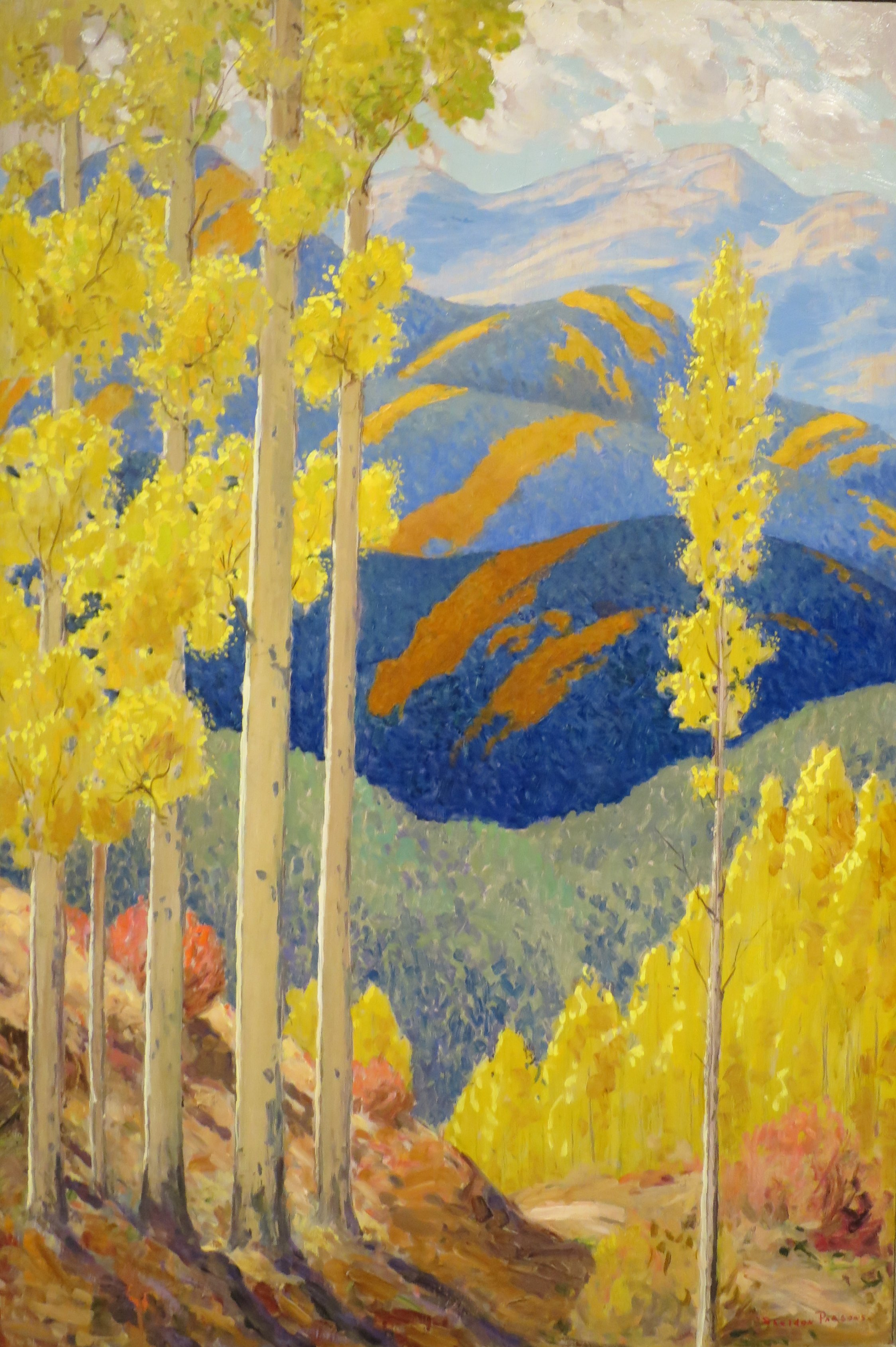
Sheldon Parsons, Santa Fe Mountains in October, c. 1919

== St. Francis Auditorium ==
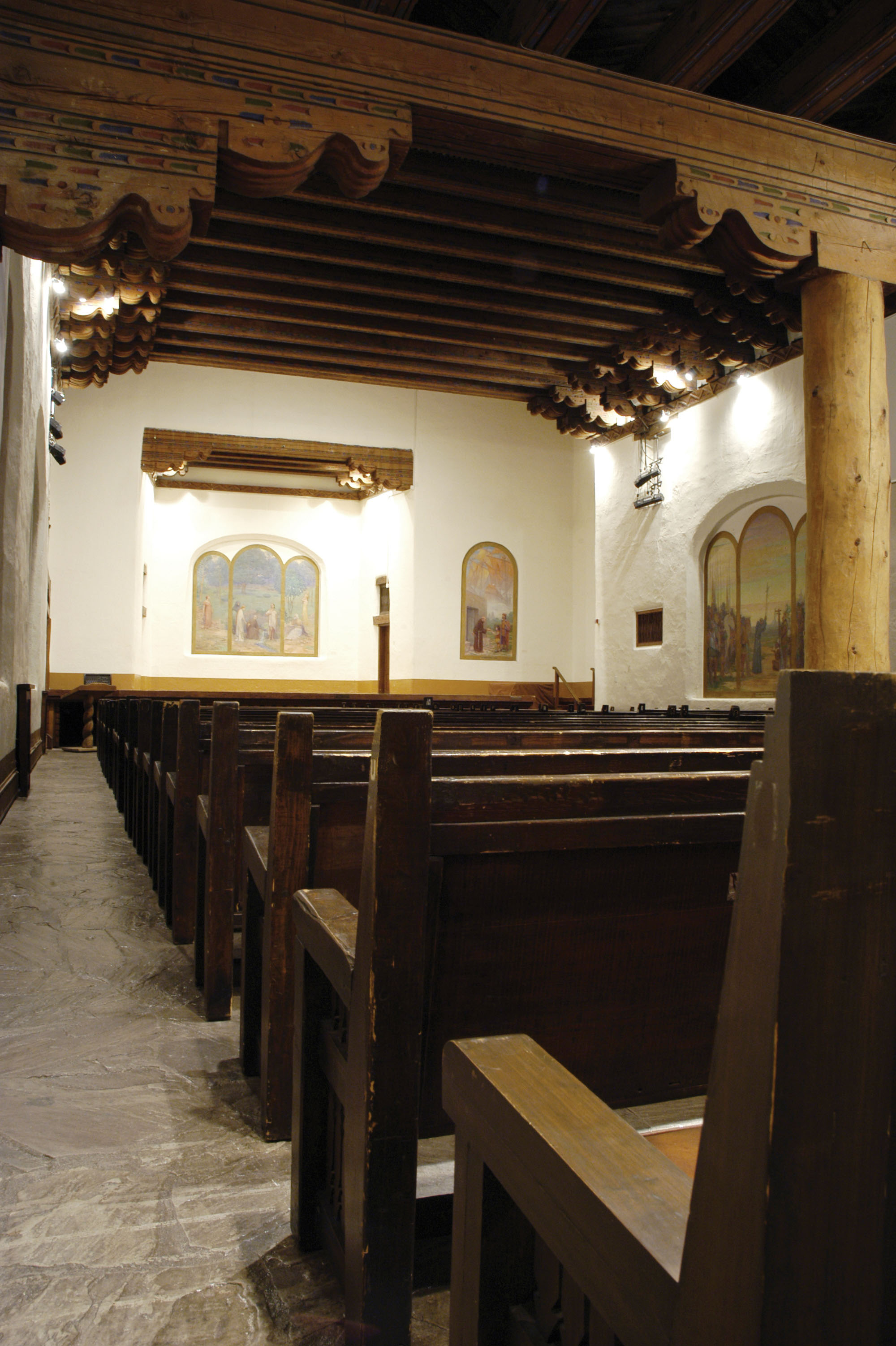
St. Francis Auditorium

The St. Francis Auditorium, located in the New Mexico Museum of Art, is the venue for various cultural and musical organizations, including the Santa Fe Chamber Music Festival and the Santa Fe Community Orchestra. The auditorium has a seating capacity of 450. The auditorium displays several murals depicting St. Francis of Assisi which were originally designed by Donald Beauregard and completed by Carlos Vierra and Kenneth M. Chapman.

== Library ==
The museum library contains art books, periodicals, biographical files of artists whose work is collected by the museum and catalogs of the museum's exhibitions since 1917.

== Vladem Contemporary ==
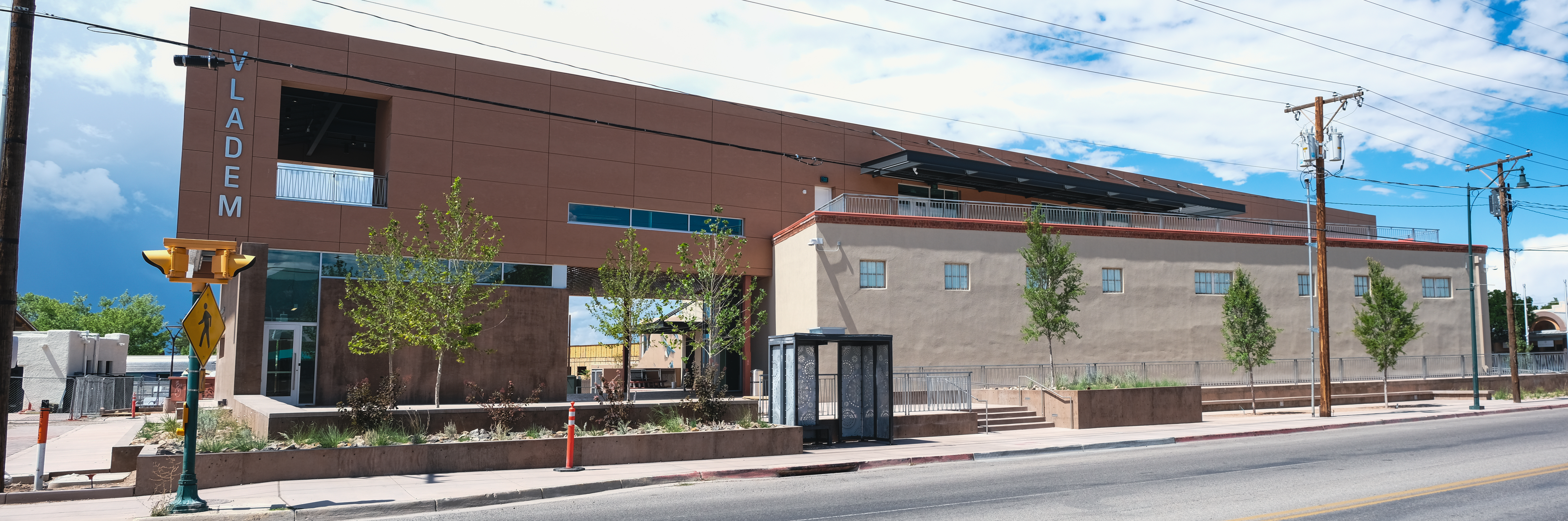
The New Mexico Museum of Art Vladem Contemporary.

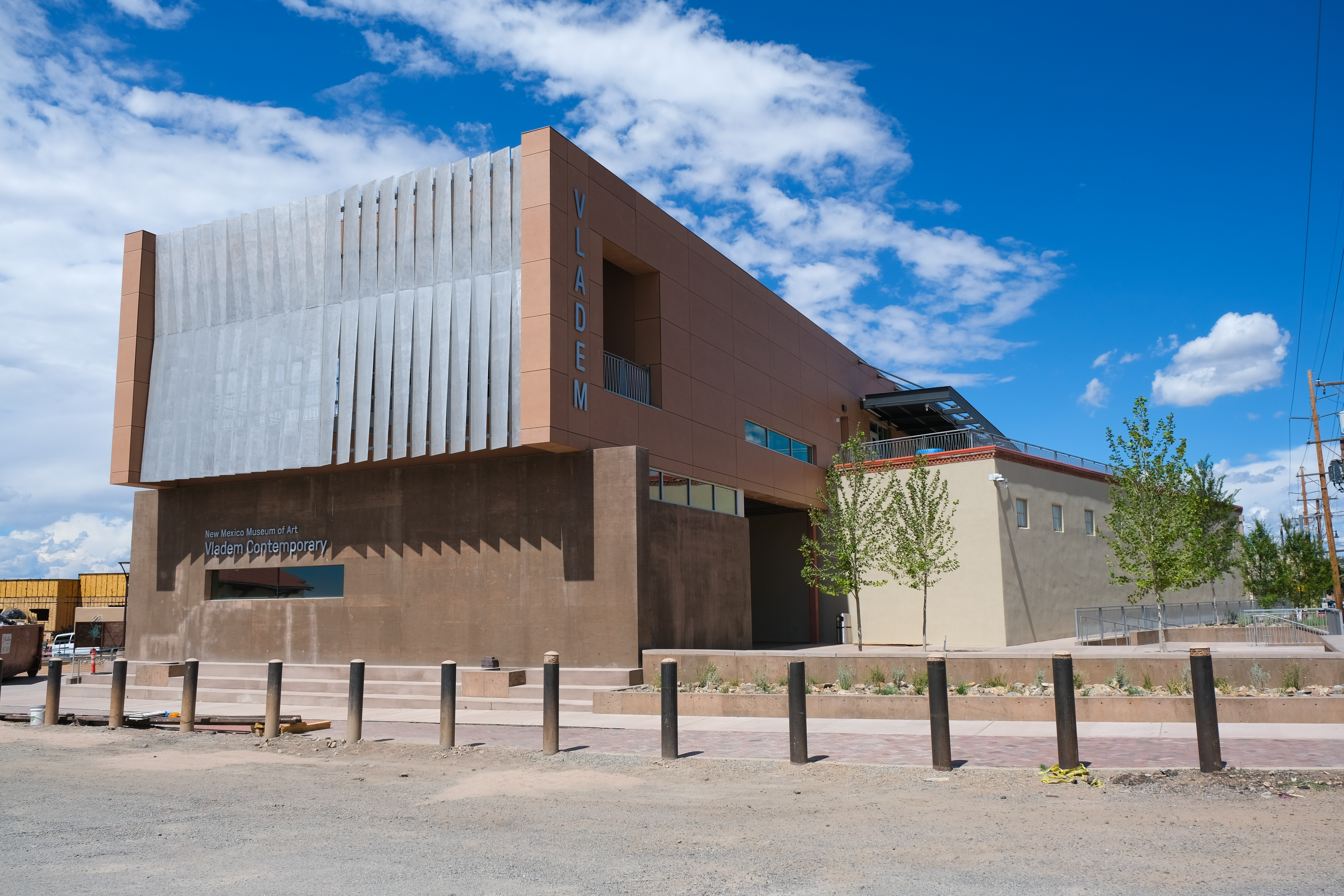
Vladem Contemporary, view from Garfield.

The Vladem Contemporary Annex of the New Mexico Museum of Art is scheduled to open in September 2023. The annex will house the New Mexico Museum of Art's contemporary collections and shows. The renovation project is an adaptive reuse of the 1936 Charles Ilfeld Warehouse (repurposed and renamed as the State of New Mexico's Joseph F Halpin Records Building). The annex is named for philanthropists Bob and Ellen Vladem.
